= Bologna =

Capital and largest city of Emilia-Romagna, Italy

Bologna Bulåggna (Emilian)
- Municipality
- Comune di Bologna
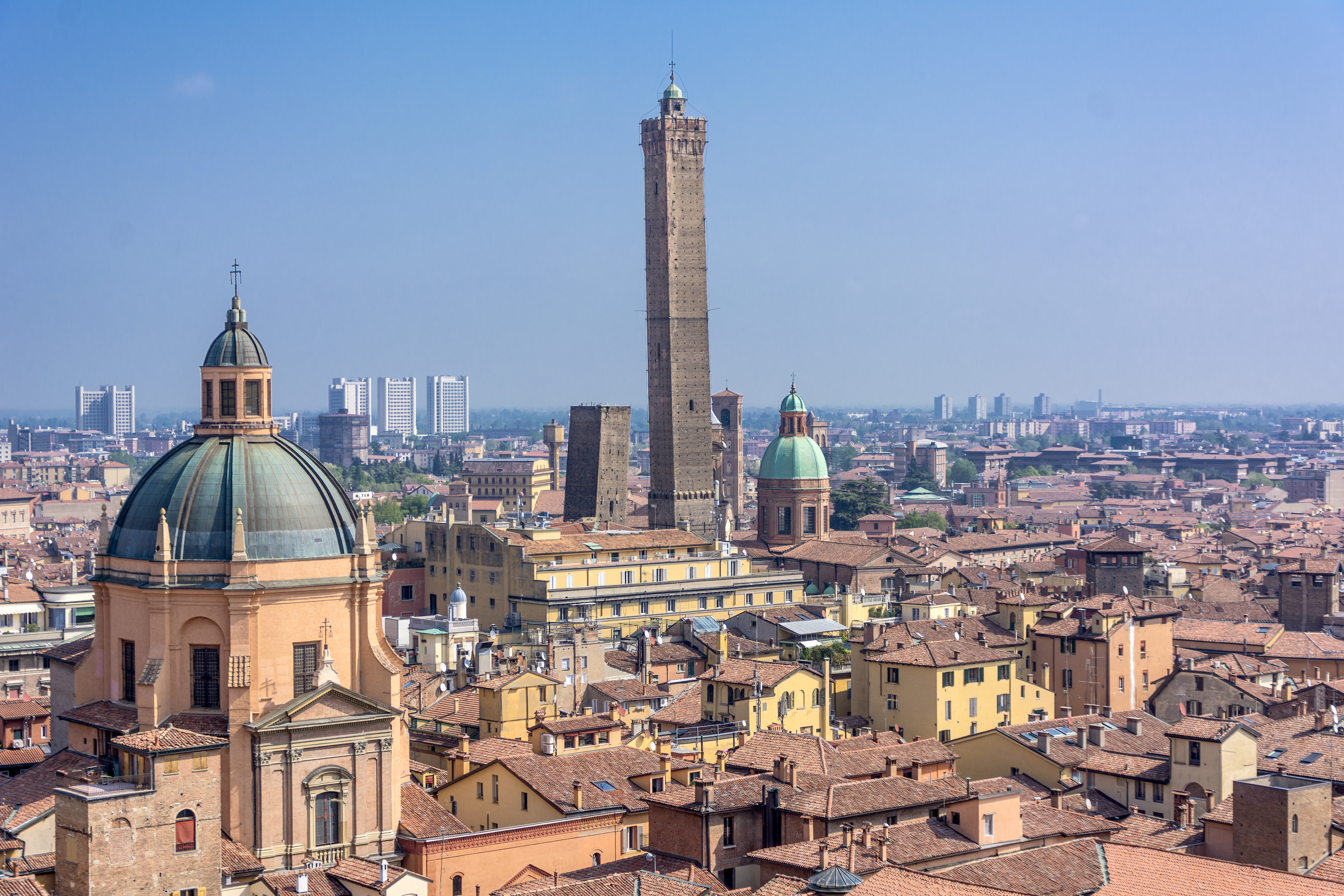
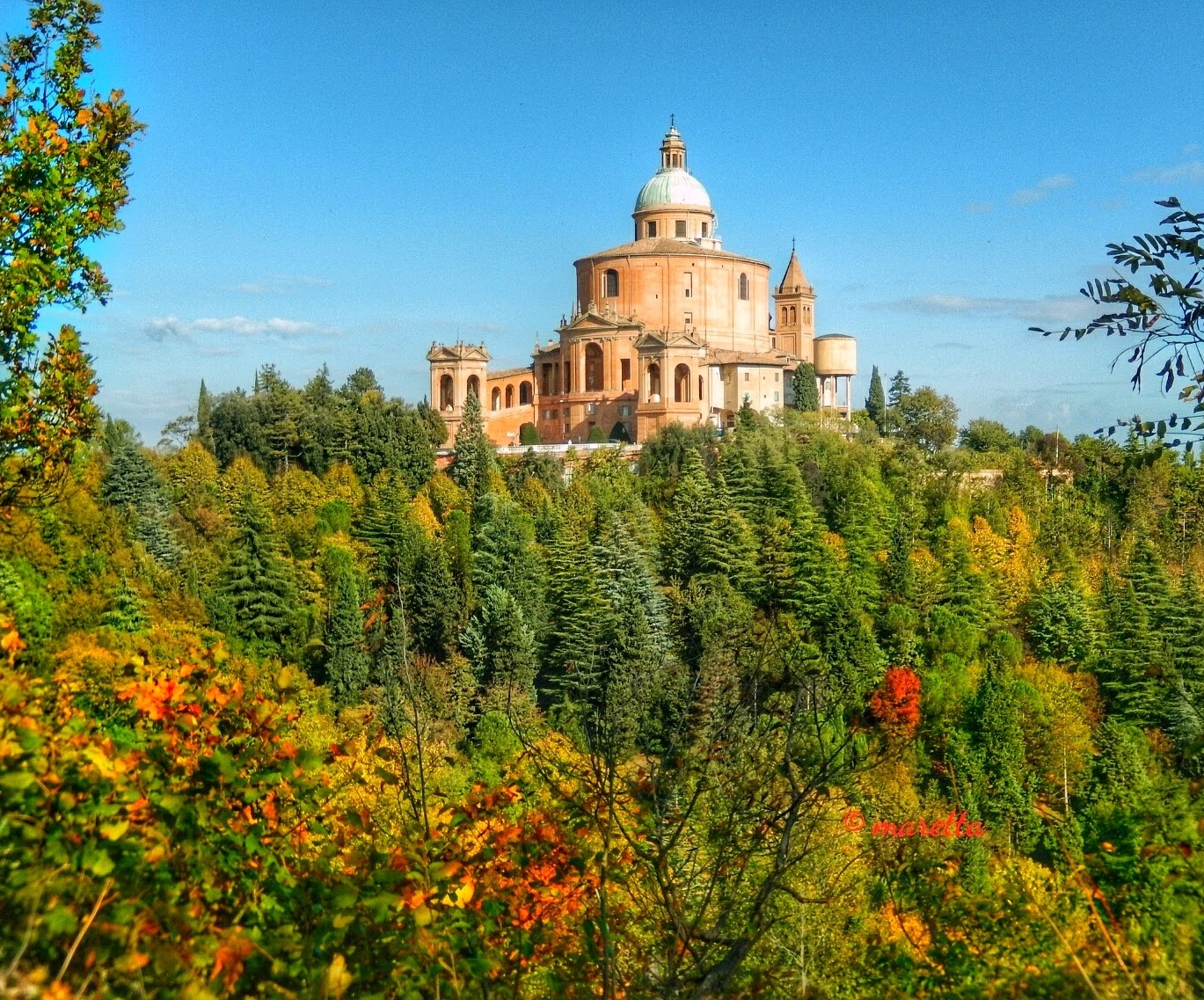
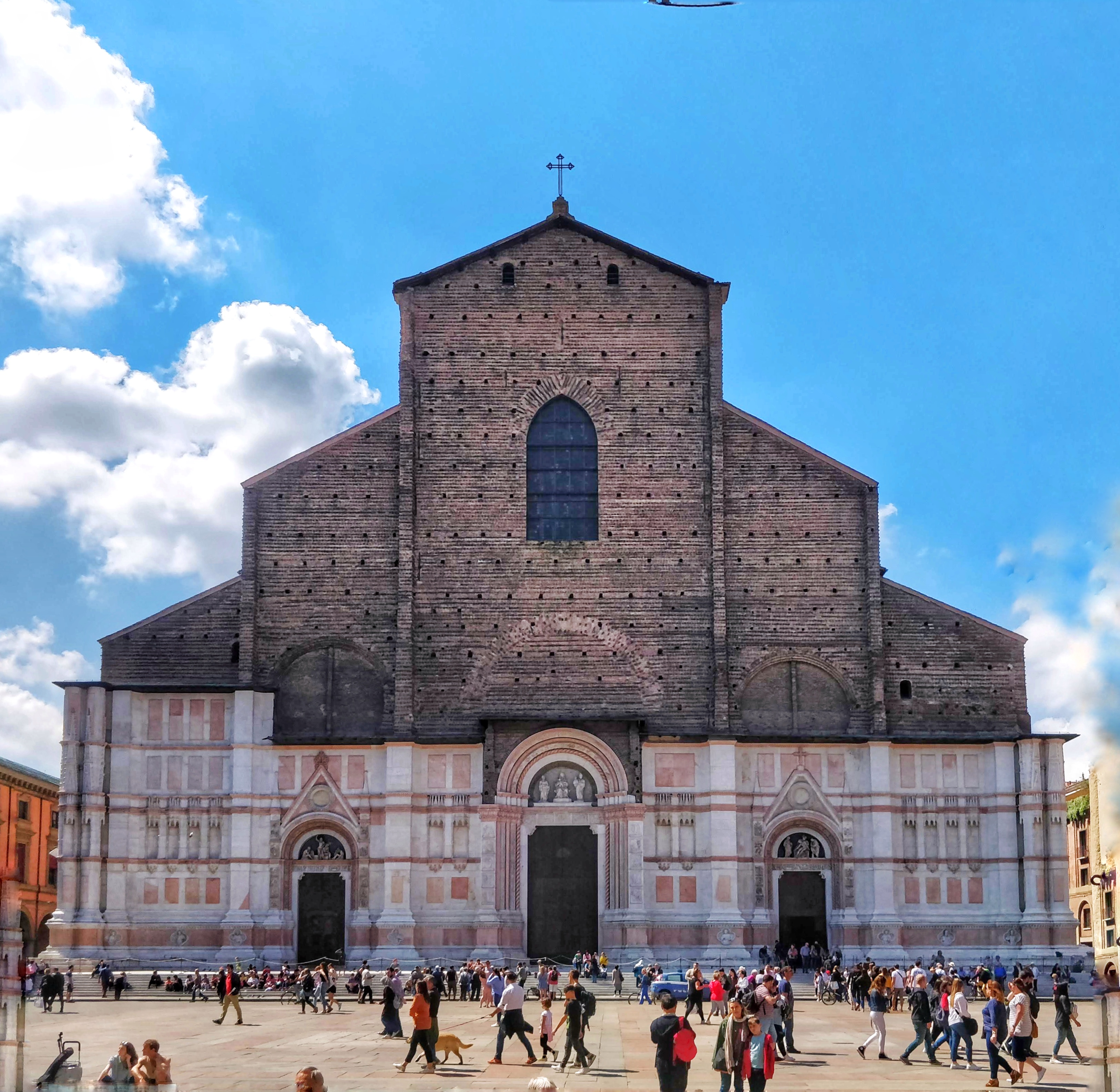
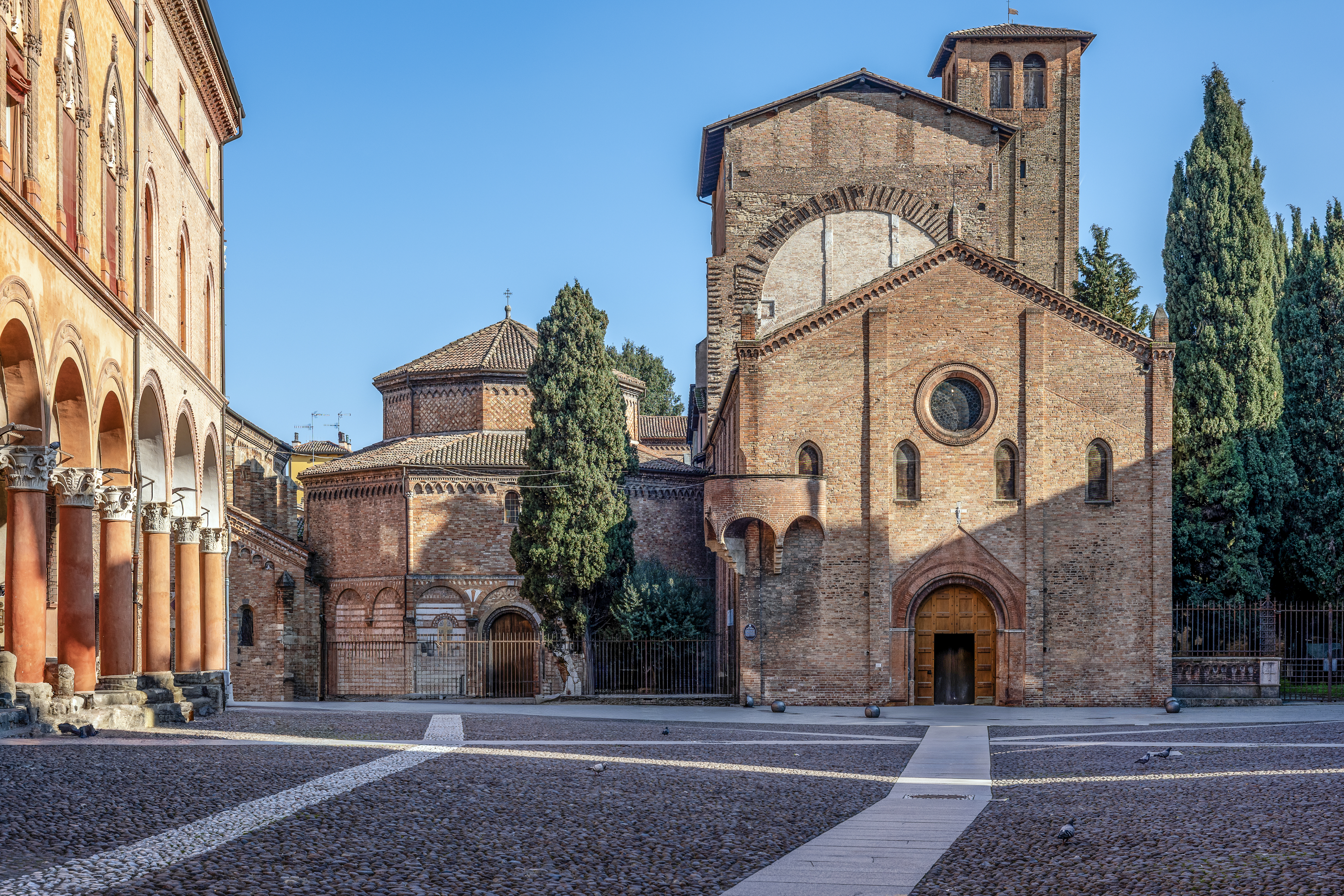
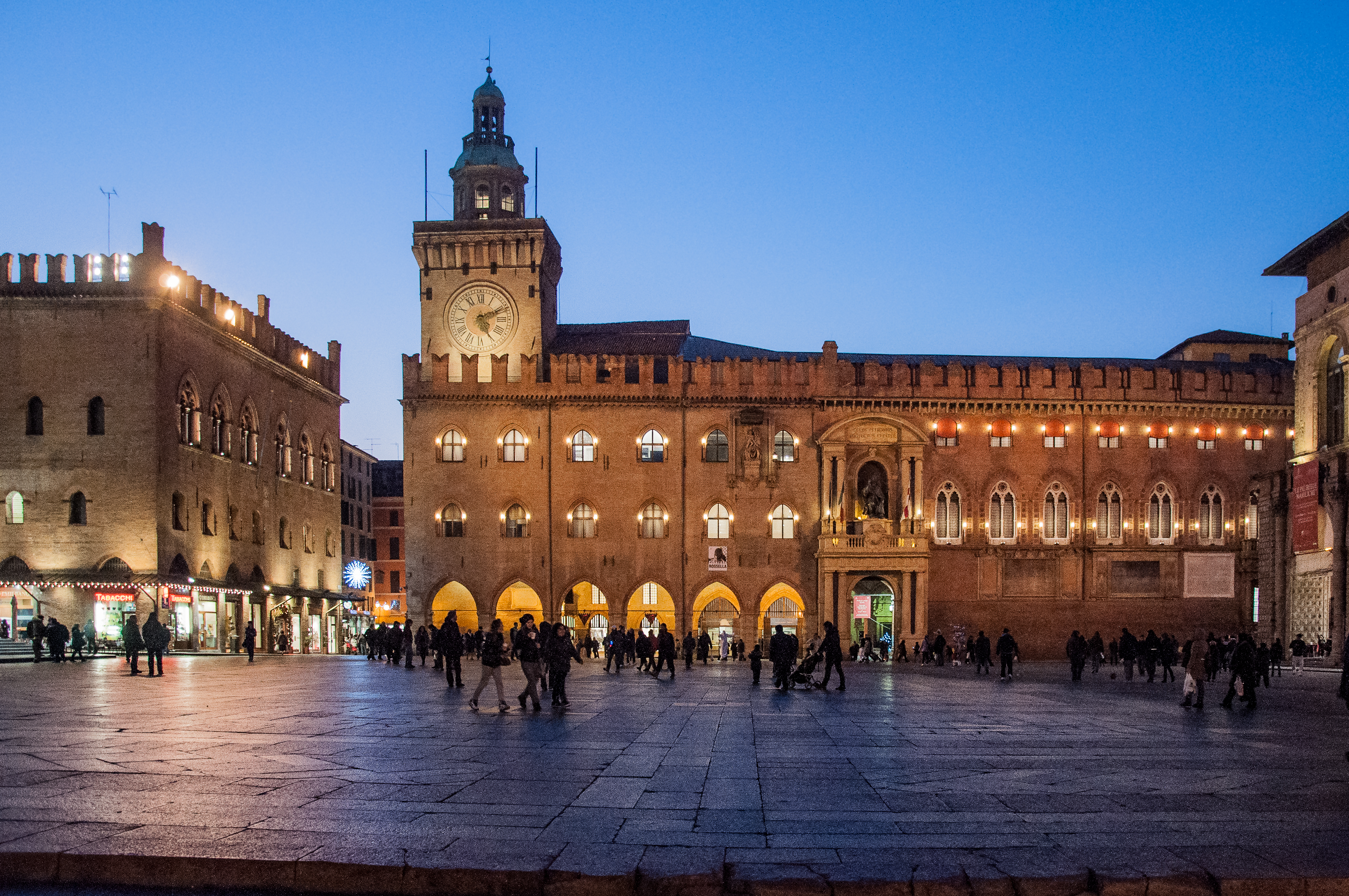
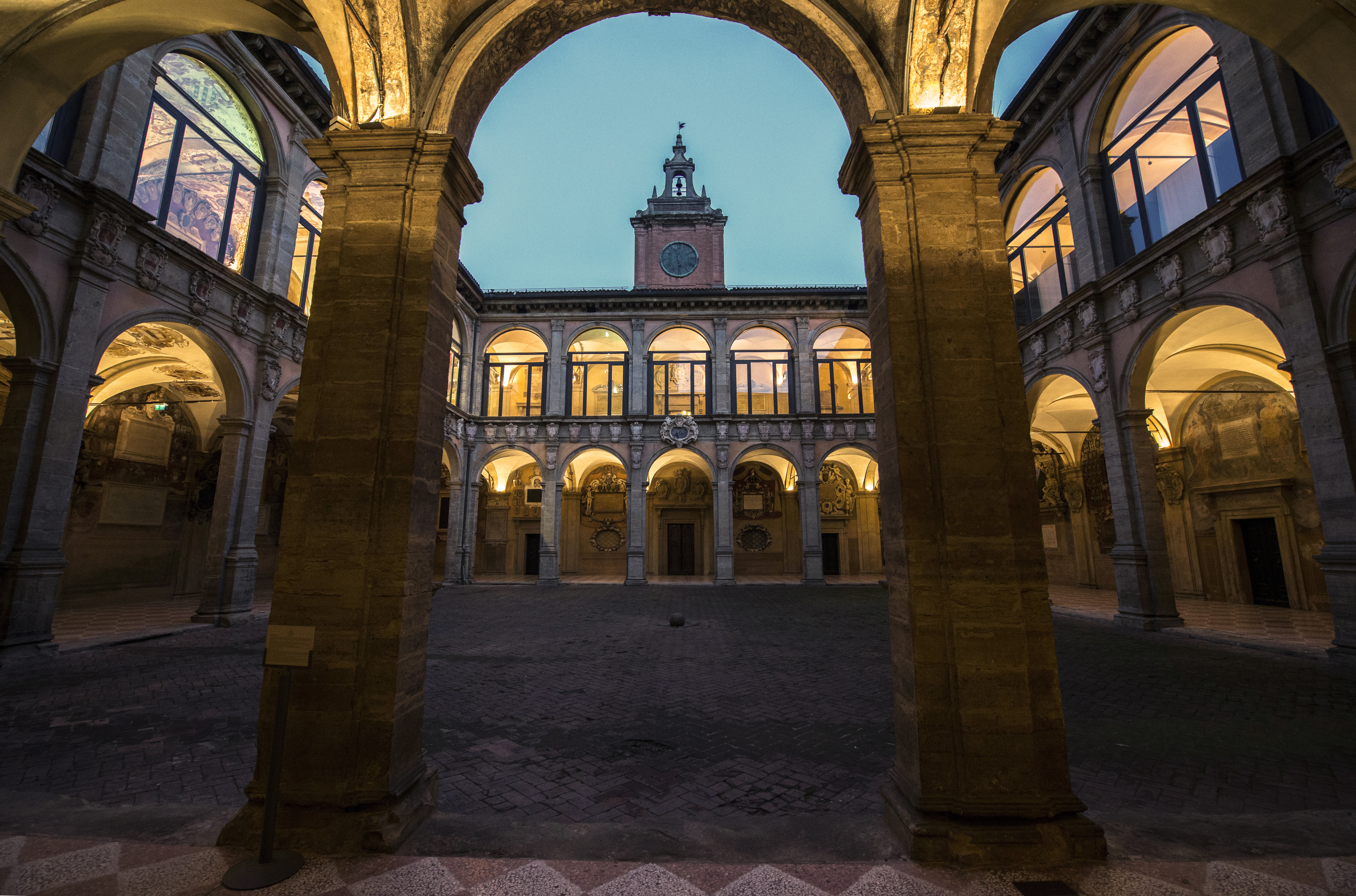
- View of Bologna with the Due Torri San Luca Fountain of Neptune San Petronio Piazza Santo Stefano Piazza Maggiore Archiginnasio

- Flag Coat of arms
- Nicknames: La Dotta (The Learned One) La Grassa (The Fat One) La Rossa (The Red One) Città turrita (Turreted City)
- Click on the map for a fullscreen view
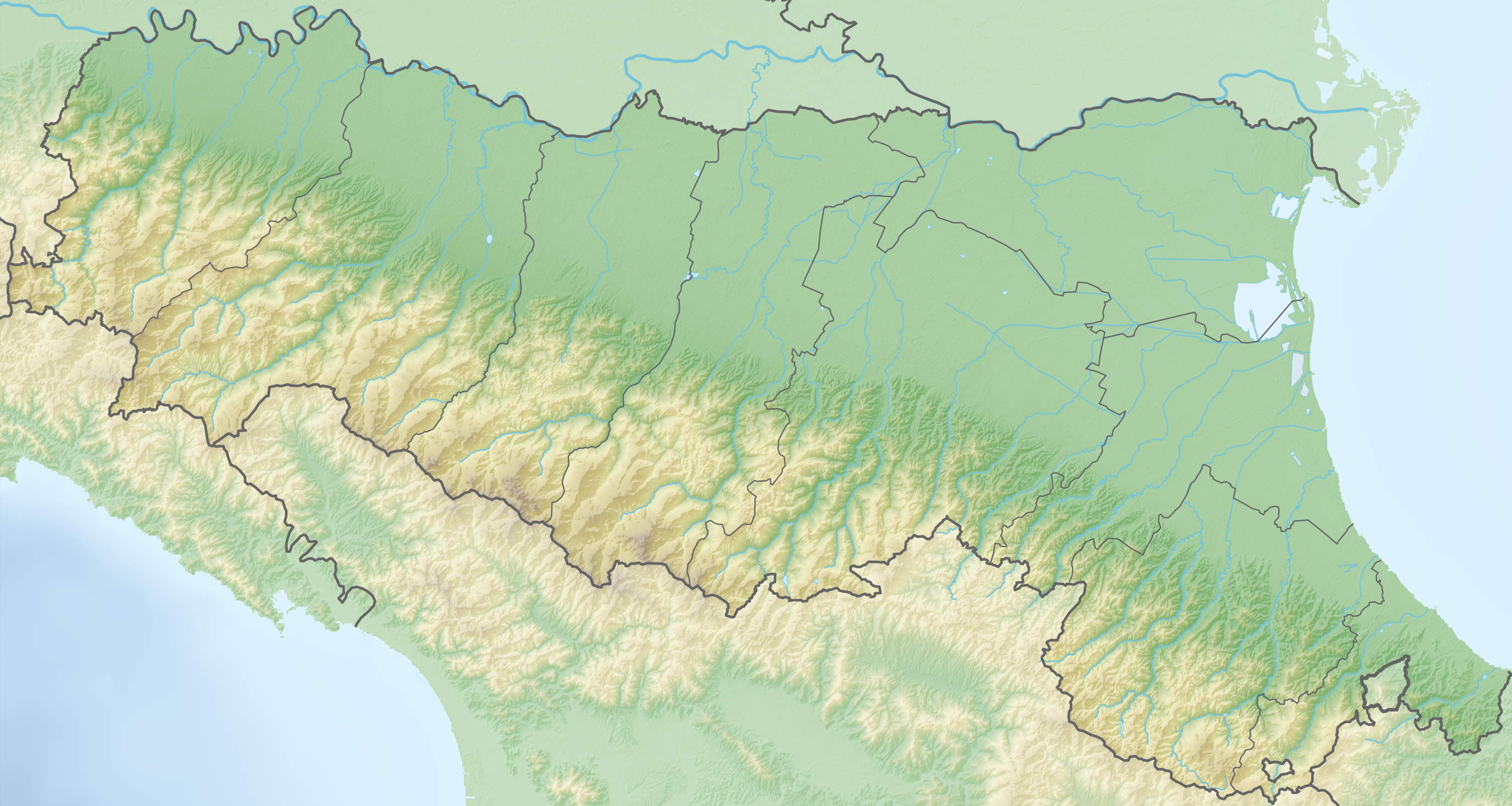
- Location within Italy Location within Emilia-Romagna Location within Europe
- Coordinates: 44°29′38″N 11°20′34″E
- Country: Italy
- Region: Emilia-Romagna
- Metro: Bologna (BO)

Government
  - Body: Bologna City Council
  - Mayor: Matteo Lepore (PD)

Area
  - Total: 140.86 km^{2} (54.39 sq mi)
  - Metropolitan city: 3,702.32 km^{2} (1,429.47 sq mi)
- Elevation: 54 m (177 ft)

Population (2026)
  - Total: 391,473 (7th in Italy)
  - Density: 2,779.2/km^{2} (7,198.0/sq mi)
  - Metropolitan city: 1,024,290
  - Metropolitan city density: 276.662/km^{2} (716.550/sq mi)
- Demonym: Bolognese

GDP
  - Metro: €39.502 billion (2015)
  - Per capita: €38,918 (2015)
- Postal code: 40121–40121
- Area code: 0039 051
- Website: comune.bologna.it

Bologna (Note: English: /bəˈloʊnjə/ bə-LOHN-yə, UK also /bəˈlɒnjə/ bə-LON-yə; Italian: [boˈloɲɲa].) (Bolognese: Bulåggna) (Note: Pronounced [buˈlʌɲɲɐ]; Latin: Bononia.) is the capital and largest city of the Emilia-Romagna region in northern Italy. It is the seventh most populous city in Italy, with 391,473 inhabitants from 150 different nationalities. Its metropolitan province is home to more than 1 million people as of 2026. Bologna is most famous for being the home to the oldest university in continuous operation, the University of Bologna, established in AD 1088.

The city has been an important urban center for centuries, first under the Etruscans (who called it Felsina), then under the Celts as Bona, later under the Romans (Bonōnia), then again in the Middle Ages, as a free municipality and later signoria, when it was among the largest European cities by population. Famous for its towers, churches and lengthy porticoes, Bologna has a well-preserved historical centre, thanks to a careful restoration and conservation policy which began at the end of the 1970s. In 2000, it was declared European capital of culture and in 2006, a UNESCO "City of Music" and part of the Creative Cities Network. In 2021, UNESCO recognized the lengthy porticoes of the city as a World Heritage Site.

Bologna is an important agricultural, industrial, financial and transport hub, where many large mechanical, electronic and food companies have their headquarters, and is also home to one of the largest permanent trade fairs in Europe. In 2022, Il Sole 24 Ore named Bologna the best city in Italy for overall quality of life, although it dropped to 4th place in 2025. Bologna intends to become carbon neutral by 2040 and raise female employment rates, focusing on sustainable and equitable urban development. The city is also increasing its investment in sustainability as part of a 2022–2024 program that integrates gender perspectives into urban planning, with an emphasis on sustainable mobility, public infrastructure, and green spaces.

== History ==
=== Antiquity and Middle Ages ===
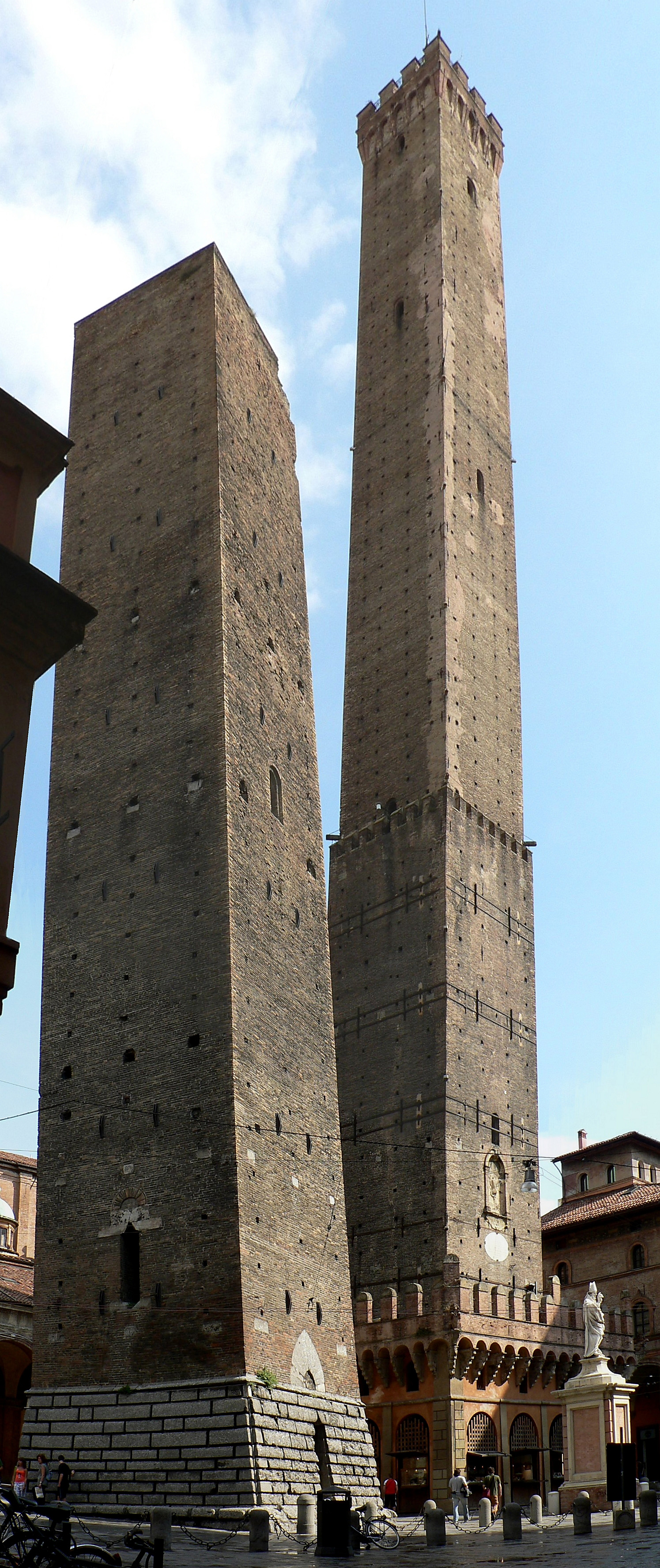
The Due Torri

Traces of human habitation in the area of Bologna go back to the 3rd millennium BCE, with significant settlements from about the 9th century BCE (Villanovan culture). The influence of Etruscan civilization reached the area in the 7th to 6th centuries, and the Etruscan city of Felsina was established at the site of Bologna by the end of the 6th century. By the 4th century BCE, the site was occupied by the Gaulish Boii, and it became a Roman colony and municipium with the name of Bonōnia in 196 BCE. During the waning years of the Western Roman Empire Bologna was repeatedly sacked by the Goths. It is in this period that legendary Bishop Petronius, according to ancient chronicles, rebuilt the ruined town and founded the basilica of Saint Stephen. Petronius is still revered as the patron saint of Bologna.

In 727–728, the city was sacked and captured by the Lombards under King Liutprand, becoming part of that kingdom. These Germanic conquerors built an important new quarter, called addizione longobarda (Italian meaning 'Longobard addition') near the complex of St. Stephen. In the last quarter of the 8th century, Charlemagne, at the request of Pope Adrian I, invaded the Lombard Kingdom, causing its eventual demise. Occupied by Frankish troops in 774 on behalf of the papacy, Bologna remained under imperial authority and prospered as a frontier mark of the Carolingian Empire.

Bologna was the center of a revived study of law, including the scholar Irnerius (c. 1050 – after 1125) and his famous students, the Four Doctors of Bologna. Bologna boasts of having one of the oldest universities in the western world (University of Bologna), with a continuous operation since 1088, and the first university in the sense of a higher-learning and degree-awarding institute. The university originated as a centre for the study of medieval Roman law under major glossators, including Irnerius. It numbered Dante, Boccaccio and Petrarch among its students. The medical school was especially renowned. By 1200, Bologna was a thriving commercial and artisanal centre of about 10,000 people.

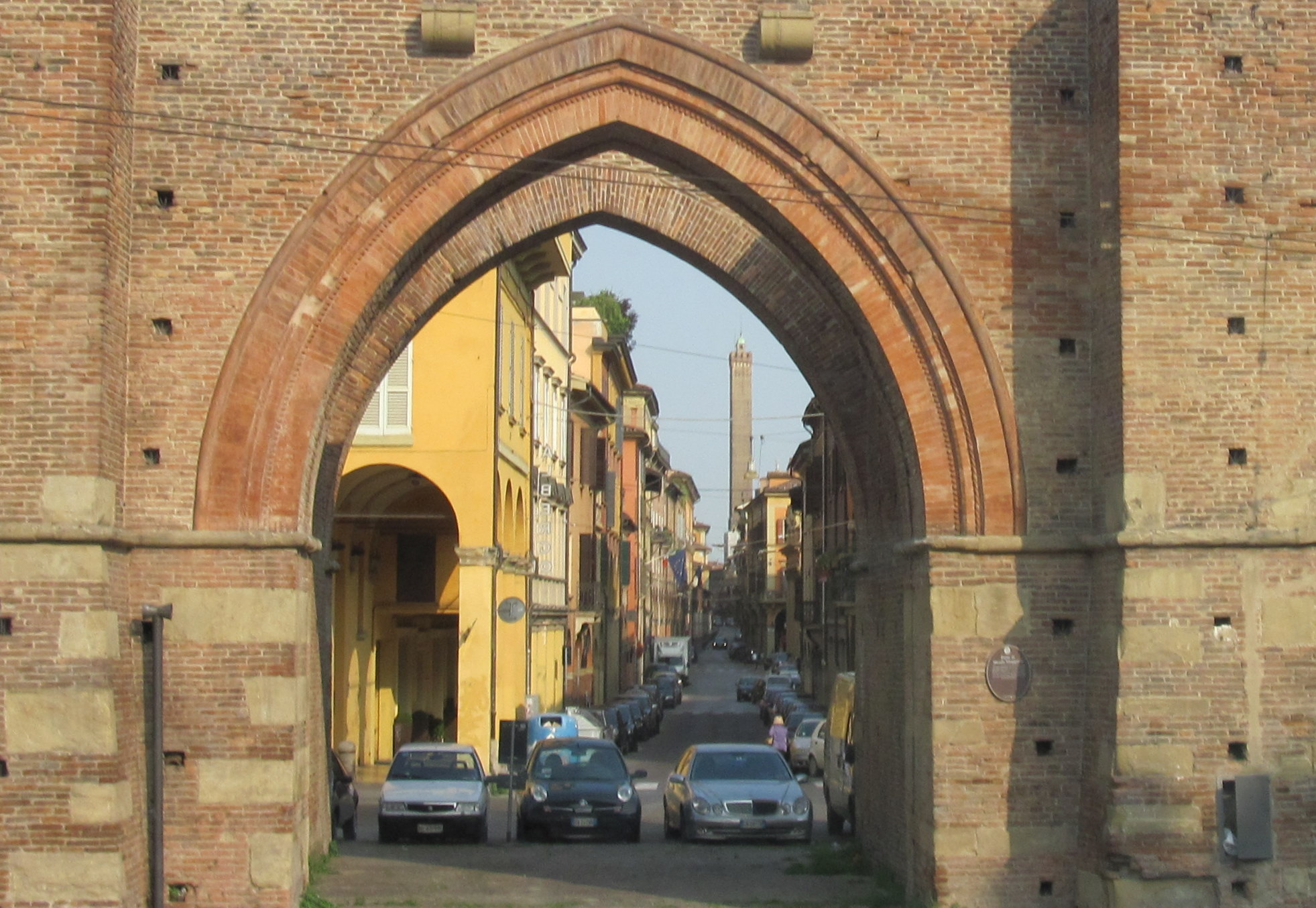
Porta Maggiore, one of the twelve medieval city gates of Bologna

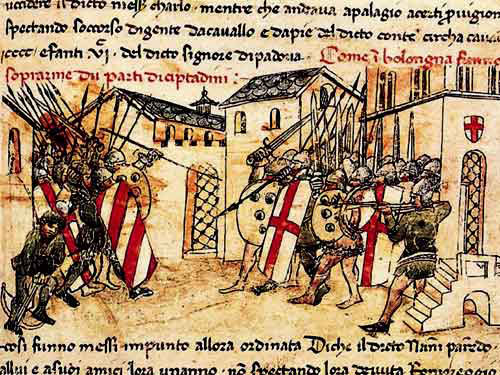
Depiction of a 14th-century fight between the Guelphs and Ghibellines in Bologna, from the Croniche of Giovanni Sercambi of Lucca

After the death of Matilda of Tuscany in 1115, Bologna obtained substantial concessions from Emperor Henry V. However, when Frederick Barbarossa subsequently attempted to strike down the deal, Bologna joined the Lombard League, which then defeated the imperial armies at the Battle of Legnano and established an effective autonomy at the Peace of Constance in 1183. Subsequently, the town began to expand rapidly and became one of the main commercial trade centres of northern Italy thanks to a system of canals that allowed barges and ships to come and go.

During a campaign to support the imperial cities of Modena and Cremona against Bologna, Frederick II's son, King Enzo of Sardinia, was defeated and captured on 26 May 1249 at the Battle of Fossalta. Although the emperor demanded his release, Enzo was thenceforth kept a knightly prisoner in Bologna, in a palace that came to be named Palazzo Re Enzo after him. Every attempt to escape or to rescue him failed, and he died after more than 22 years in captivity. After the death of his half-brothers Conrad IV in 1254, Frederick of Antioch in 1256 and Manfred in 1266, as well as the execution of his nephew Conradin in 1268, he was the last of the Hohenstaufen heirs.

During the late 13th-century, Bologna was affected by political instability when the most prominent families incessantly fought for the control of the town. The free commune was severely weakened by decades of infighting, allowing the pope to impose the rule of his envoy Cardinal Bertrand du Pouget in 1327. Du Pouget was eventually ousted by a popular rebellion and Bologna became a signoria under Taddeo Pepoli in 1334. By the arrival of the Black Death in 1348, Bologna had 40,000 to 50,000 inhabitants, reduced to just 20,000 to 25,000 after the plague.

In 1350, Bologna was conquered by archbishop Giovanni Visconti, the new lord of Milan. But following a rebellion by the town's governor, a renegade member of the Visconti family, Bologna was recovered by the papacy in 1363 by Cardinal Gil Álvarez Carrillo de Albornoz after a long negotiation involving a huge indemnity paid to Bernabò Visconti, Giovanni's heir, who died in 1354. In 1376, Bologna again revolted against Papal rule and joined Florence in the unsuccessful War of the Eight Saints. However, extreme infighting inside the Holy See after the Western Schism prevented the papacy from restoring its domination over Bologna, so it remained relatively independent for some decades as an oligarchic republic. In 1401, Giovanni I Bentivoglio took power in a coup with the support of Milan, but, having turned his back on them and allied with Florence, the Milanese marched on Bologna and had Giovanni killed the following year. In 1442, Hannibal I Bentivoglio, Giovanni's nephew, recovered Bologna from the Milanese, only to be assassinated in a conspiracy plotted by Pope Eugene IV three years later. But the signoria of the Bentivoglio family was then firmly established, and the power passed to his cousin Sante Bentivoglio, who ruled until 1462, followed by Giovanni II. Giovanni II managed to resist the expansionist designs of Cesare Borgia for some time, but on 7 October 1506, Pope Julius II issued a bull deposing and excommunicating Bentivoglio and placing the city under interdict. When the papal troops, along with a contingent sent by Louis XII of France, marched against Bologna, Bentivoglio and his family fled. Julius II entered the city triumphantly on 10 November.

=== Early modern ===
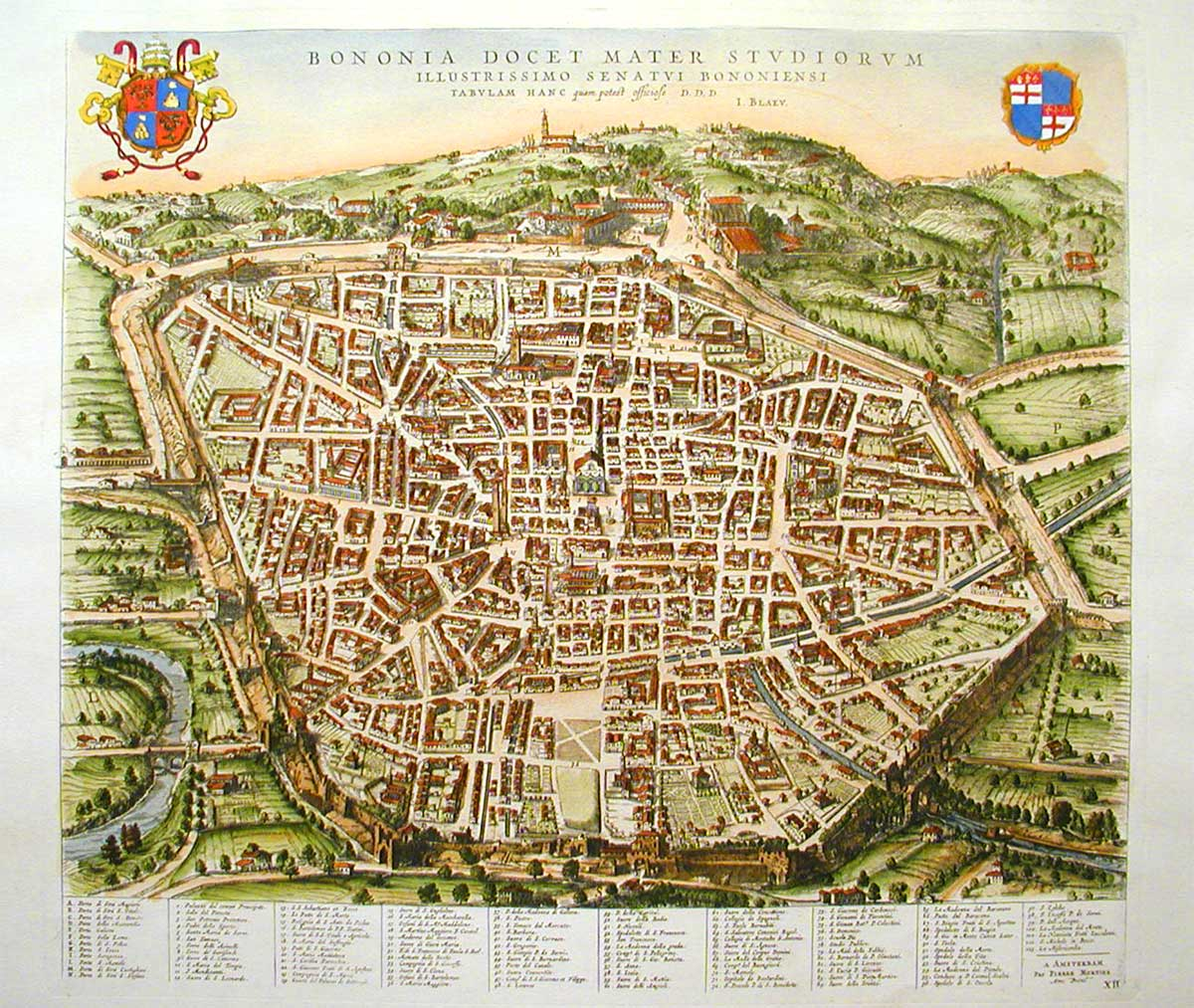
Bologna in 1640

The period of papal rule over Bologna (1506–1796) has been generally evaluated by historians as one of severe decline. However, this was not evident in the 1500s, which were marked by some major developments in Bologna. In 1530, Emperor Charles V was crowned in Bologna, the last to be crowned by the pope. In 1564, the Piazza del Nettuno and the Palazzo dei Banchi were built, along with the Archiginnasio, the main building of the university. The period of Papal rule saw also the construction of many churches and other religious establishments, and the restoration of older ones. At this time, Bologna had ninety-six convents, more than any other Italian city. Painters working in Bologna during this period established the Bolognese School which includes Annibale Carracci, Domenichino, Guercino, and others of European fame.

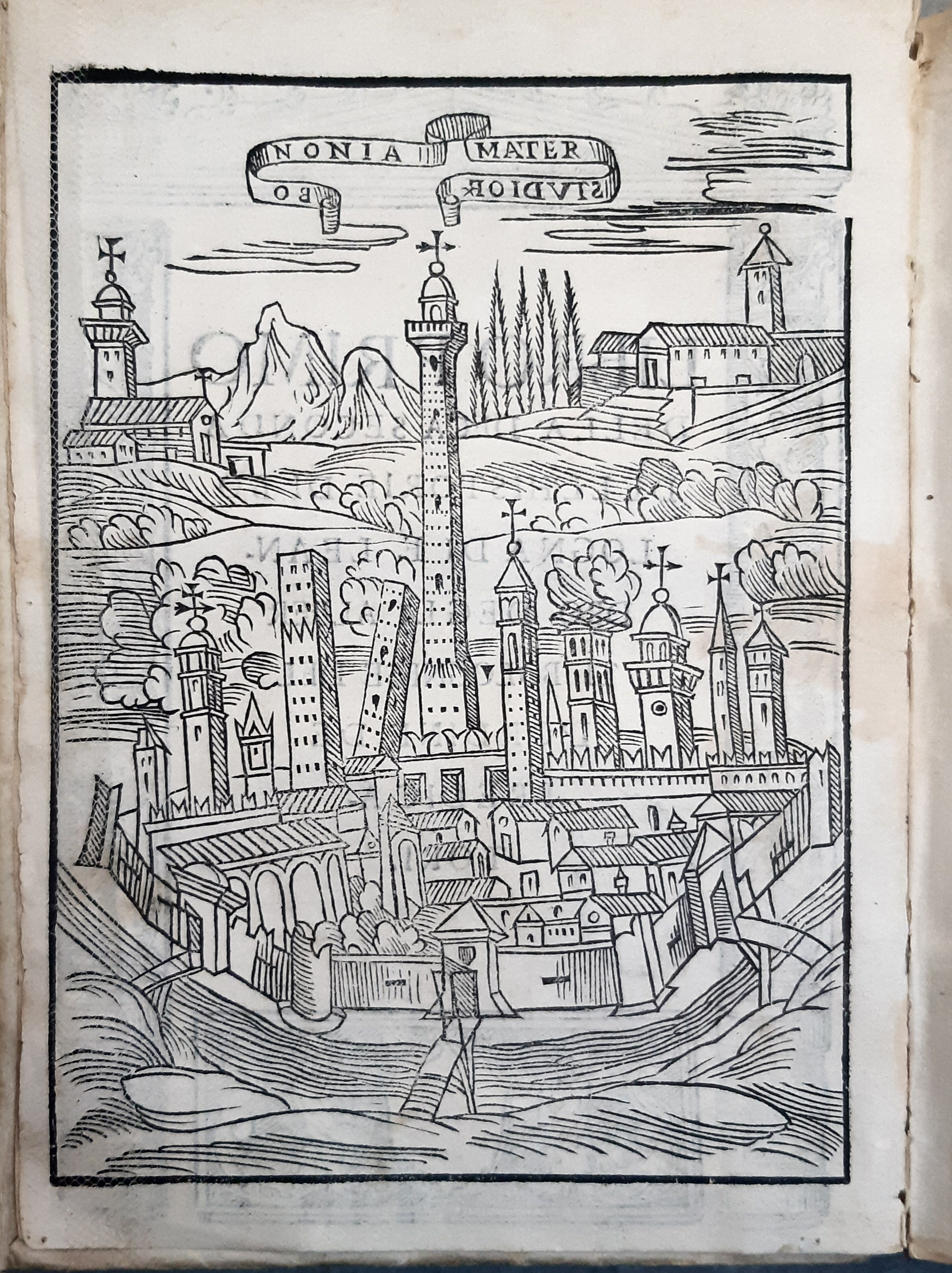
Engraving of the city of Bologna from Leandro Alberti's History of Bologna, 1590, showing the two surviving towers and several others

It was only towards the end of the 16th century that severe signs of decline began to manifest. A series of plagues in the late 16th to early 17th century reduced the population of the city from some 72,000 in the mid-16th century to about 47,000 by 1630. During the 1629–1631 Italian plague alone, Bologna lost up to a third of its population. In the mid-17th century, the population stabilized at roughly 60,000, slowly increasing to some 70,000 by the mid-18th century. The economy of Bologna started to show signs of severe decline as the global centres of trade shifted towards the Atlantic. The traditional silk industry was in a critical state. The university was losing students, who once came from all over Europe, because of the illiberal attitudes of the Church towards culture (especially after the trial of Galileo). Bologna continued to suffer a progressive deindustrialisation also in the 18th century.

In the mid-1700s, Pope Benedict XIV, a Bolognese, tried to reverse the decline of the city with a series of reforms intended to stimulate the economy and promote the arts. However, these reforms achieved only mixed results. The pope's efforts to stimulate the decaying textile industry had little success, while he was more successful in reforming the tax system, liberalising trade and relaxing the oppressive system of censorship.

The economic and demographic decline of Bologna became even more noticeable starting in the second half of the 18th century. In 1790, the city had 72,000 inhabitants, ranking as the second largest in the Papal States; however, this figure had remained unchanged for decades.

During this period, Papal economic policies included heavy customs duties and concessions of monopolies to single manufacturers.

=== Modern history ===
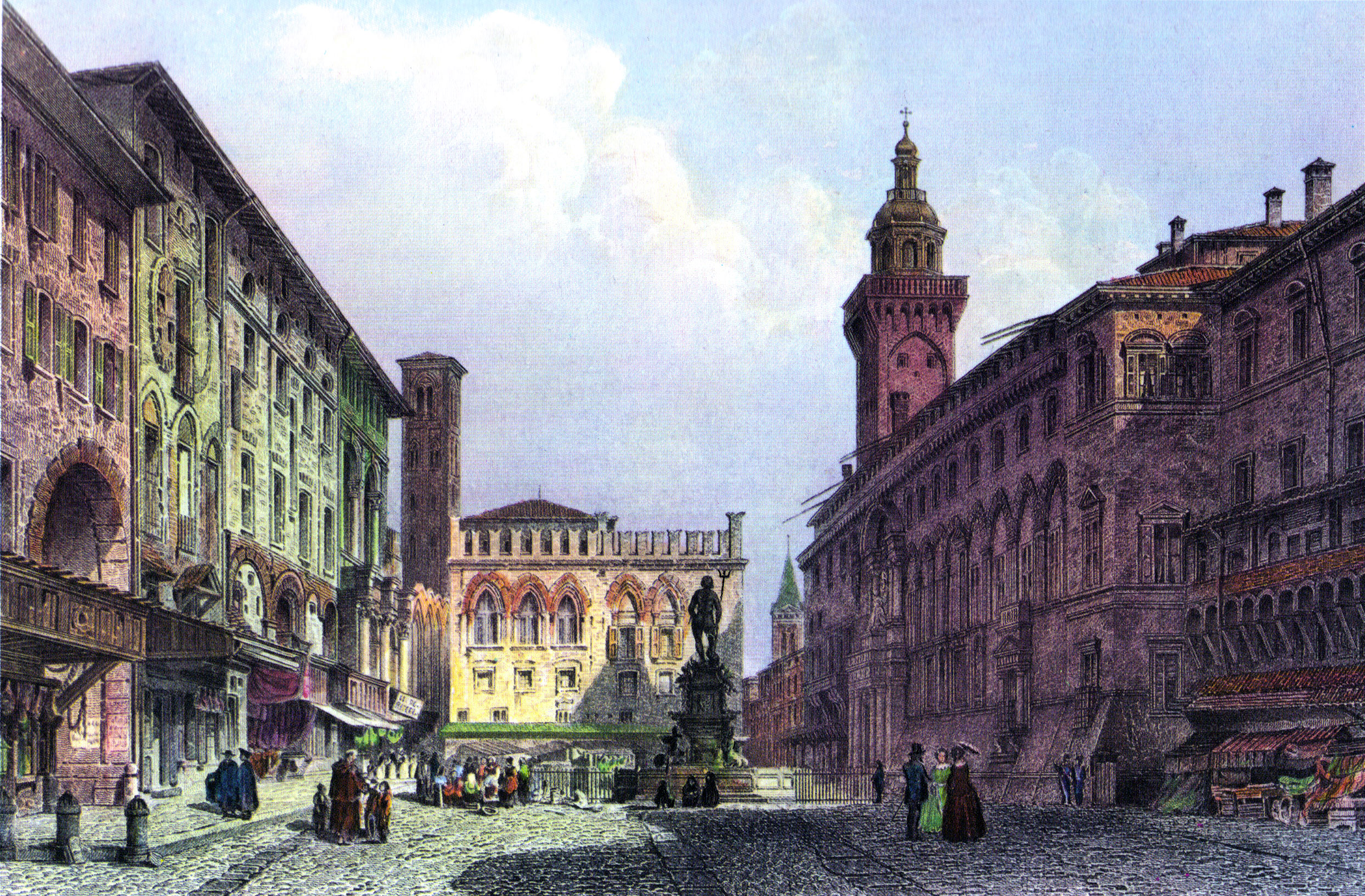
Piazza del Nettuno in 1855, looking towards Piazza Maggiore

Napoleon entered Bologna on 19 June 1796. Napoleon briefly reinstated the ancient mode of government, giving power to the Senate of Bologna, which however had to swear fealty to the short-lived Cispadane Republic, created as a client state of the French First Republic at the congress of Reggio (27 December 1796 – 9 January 1797) but succeeded by the Cisalpine Republic on 9 July 1797, later by the Italian Republic and finally the Kingdom of Italy. After the fall of Napoleon, the Congress of Vienna of 1815 restored Bologna to the Papal States. Papal rule was contested in the uprisings of 1831. The insurrected provinces planned to unite as the Province Italiane Unite with Bologna as the capital. Pope Gregory XVI asked for Austrian help against the rebels. Metternich warned French king Louis Philippe I against intervention in Italian affairs, and in the spring of 1831, Austrian forces marched across the Italian peninsula, defeating the rebellion by 26 April.

By the mid-1840s, unemployment levels were very high and traditional industries continued to languish or disappear; Bologna became a city of economic disparity with the top 10 percent of the population living off rent, another 20 percent exercising professions or commerce and 70 percent working in low-paid, often insecure manual jobs. The Papal census of 1841 reported 10,000 permanent beggars and another 30,000 (out of a total population of 70,000) who lived in poverty. In the revolutions of 1848 the Austrian garrisons which controlled the city on behalf of the pope were temporarily expelled, but eventually came back and crushed the revolutionaries.

Papal rule finally ended in the aftermath of Second War of Italian Independence, when the French and Piedmontese troops expelled the Austrians from Italian lands, on 11 and 12 March 1860, Bologna voted to join the new Kingdom of Italy. In the last decades of the 19th century, Bologna once again thrived economically and socially. In 1863 Naples was linked to Rome by railway, and the following year Bologna to Florence. Bolognese moderate agrarian elites, that supported liberal insurgencies against the papacy and were admirers of the British political system and of free trade, envisioned a unified national state that would open a bigger market for the massive agricultural production of the Emilian plains. Indeed, Bologna gave Italy one of its first prime ministers, Marco Minghetti.

After World War I, Bologna was heavily involved in the Biennio Rosso socialist uprisings. As a consequence, the traditionally moderate elites of the city turned their back on the progressive faction and gave their support to the rising Fascist movement of Benito Mussolini. Dino Grandi, a high-ranking Fascist party official and Ministry of Foreign Affairs, remembered for being an Anglophile, was from Bologna. During the interwar years, Bologna developed into an important manufacturing centre for food processing, agricultural machinery and metalworking. The Fascist regime poured in massive investments, for example with the setting up of a giant tobacco manufacturing plant in 1937.

==== World War II ====
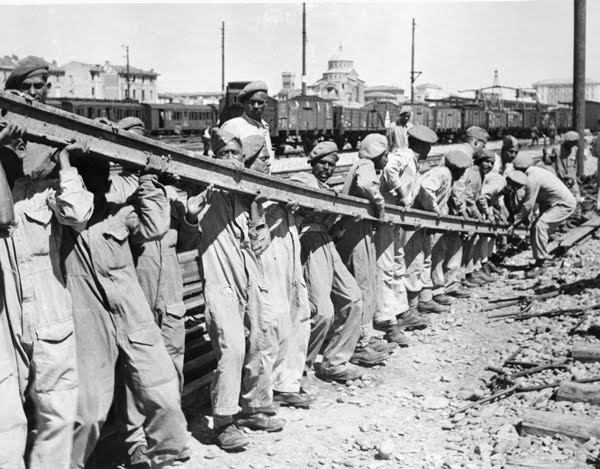
Sappers of the 136 Indian Railway Maintenance Company repair some of the extensive damage to the railyards in 1945.

Bologna suffered extensive damage during World War II. The strategic importance of the city as an industrial and railway hub connecting northern and central Italy made it a target for the Allied forces. On 24 July 1943, a massive aerial bombardment destroyed a significant part of the historic city centre and killed about 200 people. The main railway station and adjoining areas were severely hit, and 44% of the buildings in the centre were listed as having been destroyed or severely damaged. The city was heavily bombed again on 25 September. The raids, which this time were not confined to the city centre, left 2,481 people dead and 2,000 injured. By the end of the war, 43% of all buildings in Bologna had been destroyed or damaged.

After the armistice of 1943, the city became a key centre of the Italian resistance movement. On 7 November 1944, a pitched battle around Porta Lame, waged by partisans of the 7th Brigade of the Gruppi d'Azione Patriottica against Fascist and Nazi occupation forces, did not succeed in triggering a general uprising, despite being one of the largest resistance-led urban conflicts in the European theatre. Resistance forces entered Bologna on the morning of 21 April 1945. By this time, the Germans had already largely left the city in the face of the Allied advance, spearheaded by Polish forces advancing from the east during the Battle of Bologna which had been fought since 9 April. First to arrive in the centre was the 87th Infantry Regiment of the Friuli Combat Group under general Arturo Scattini, who entered the centre from Porta Maggiore to the south. Since the soldiers were dressed in British outfits, they were initially thought to be part of the allied forces; when the local inhabitants heard the soldiers were speaking Italian, they poured out onto the streets to celebrate.

==== Cold War period ====
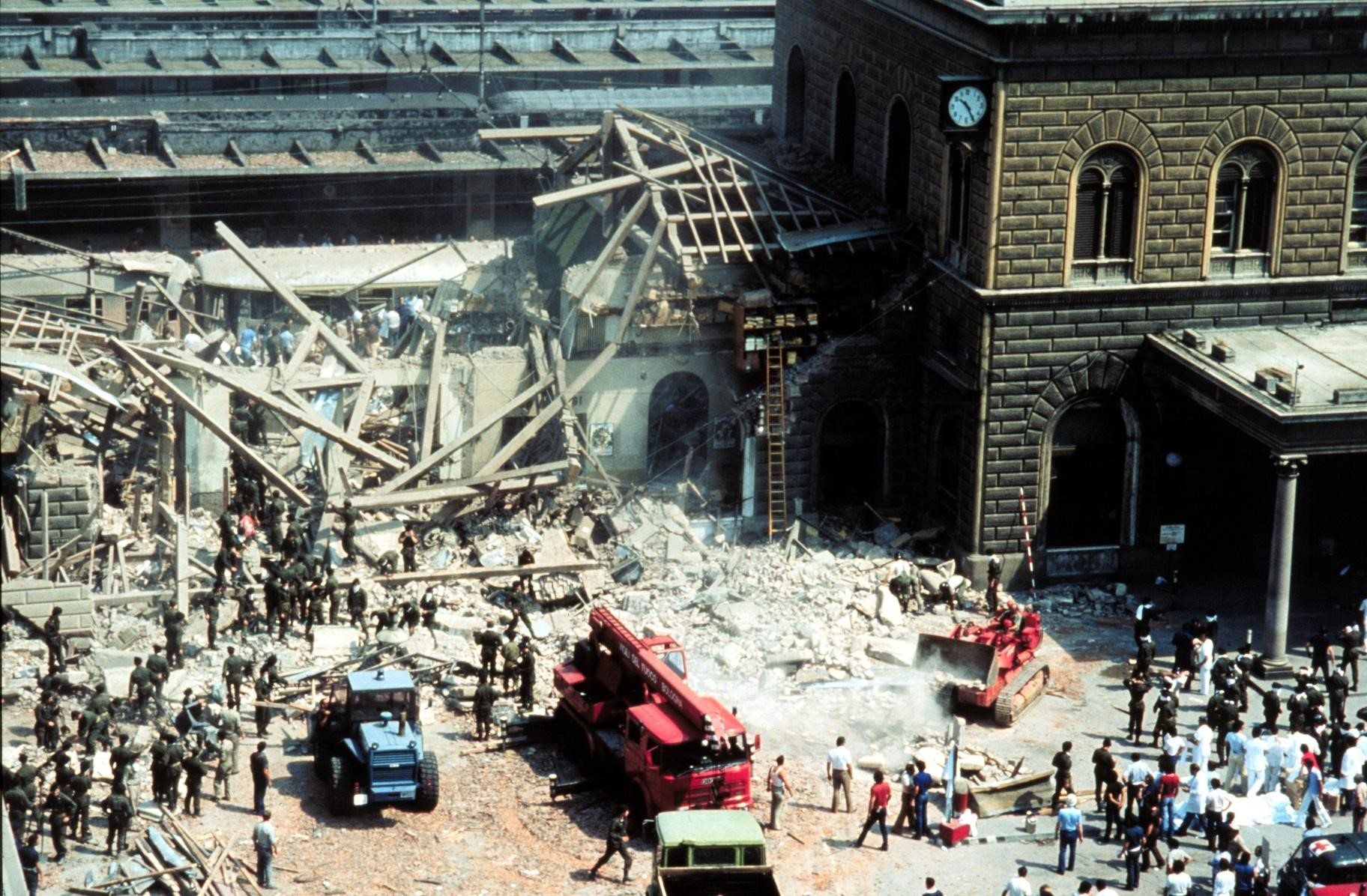
Aftermath of the 1980 terrorist bombing

In the post-war years, Bologna became a thriving industrial centre as well as a political stronghold of the Italian Communist Party. Between 1945 and 1999, the city was helmed by an uninterrupted succession of mayors from the PCI and its successors, the Democratic Party of the Left and Democrats of the Left, the first of whom was Giuseppe Dozza. At the end of the 1960s the city authorities, worried by massive gentrification and suburbanisation, asked Japanese starchitect Kenzo Tange to sketch a master plan for a new town north of Bologna; however, the project that came out in 1970 was evaluated as too ambitious and expensive. Eventually the city council, in spite of vetoing Tange's master plan, decided to keep his project for a new exhibition centre and business district. At the end of 1978 the construction of a tower block and several diverse buildings and structures started. In 1985 the headquarters of the regional government of Emilia-Romagna moved in the new district.

In 1977, Bologna was the scene of rioting linked to the Movement of 1977, a spontaneous political movement of the time. The police shooting of a far-left activist, Francesco Lorusso, sparked two days of street clashes. On 2 August 1980, at the height of the "years of lead", a terrorist bomb was set off in the central railway station of Bologna killing 85 people and wounding 200, an event which is known in Italy as the Bologna massacre. In 1995, members of the neo-fascist group Nuclei Armati Rivoluzionari were convicted for carrying out the attack, while Licio Gelli—Grand Master of the underground Freemason lodge Propaganda Due (P2)—was convicted for hampering the investigation, together with three agents of the secret military intelligence service SISMI (including Francesco Pazienza and Pietro Musumeci). Commemorations take place in Bologna on 2 August each year, culminating in a concert in the main square.

==== 21st century ====
In 1999, the long tradition of left-wing mayors was interrupted by the victory of independent centre-right candidate Giorgio Guazzaloca. However, Bologna reverted to form in 2004 when Sergio Cofferati, a former trade union leader, unseated Guazzaloca. The next centre-left mayor, Flavio Delbono, elected in June 2009, resigned in January 2010 after being involved in a corruption scandal. After a 15-month period in which the city was administered under Anna Maria Cancellieri (as a state-appointed prefect), Virginio Merola was elected as mayor, leading a left-wing coalition comprising the Democratic Party, Left Ecology Freedom and Italy of Values. In 2016, Merola was confirmed mayor, defeating the conservative candidate, Lucia Borgonzoni. In 2021, after ten years of Merola's mayorship, one of his closest allies, Matteo Lepore, was elected mayor with 61.9% of votes, becoming the most voted mayor of Bologna since the introduction of the direct elections in 1995.

== Geography ==
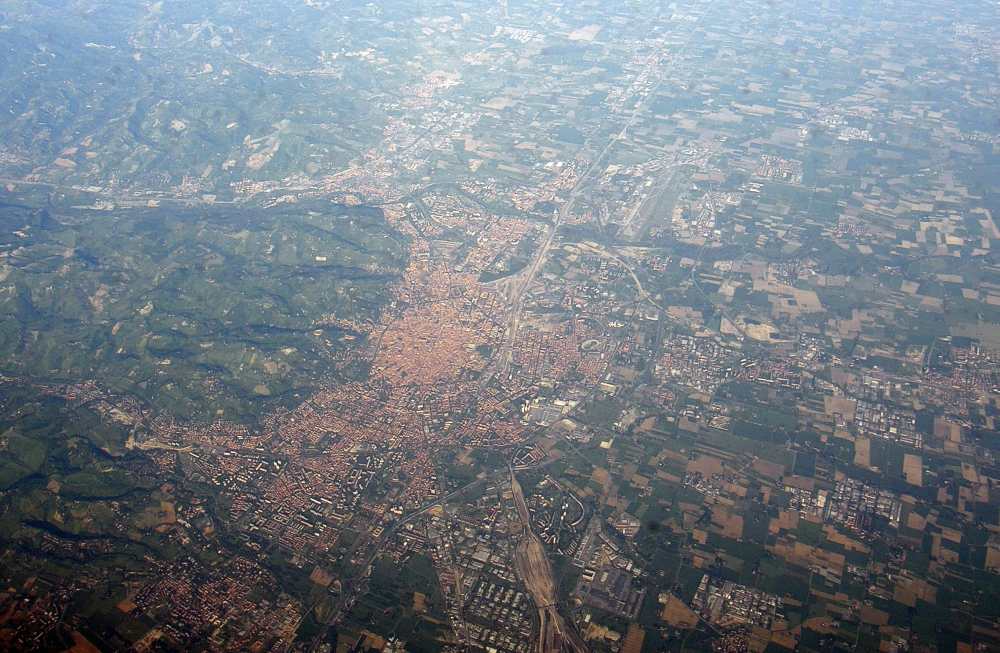
Aerial photograph of Bologna (north facing on the right)

Bologna is situated on the edge of the Po Plain at the foot of the Apennine Mountains, at the meeting of the Reno and Savena river valleys. As Bologna's two main watercourses flow directly to the sea, the town lies outside of the drainage basin of the River Po. The province of Bologna stretches from the western edge of the Po Plain on the border with Ferrara to the Tuscan-Emilian Apennines. The centre of the town is 54 metres (177 ft) above sea level (while elevation within the municipality ranges from 29 metres (95 ft) in the suburb of Corticella to 300 metres (980 ft) in Sabbiuno and the Colle della Guardia). The province of Bologna stretches from the Po Plain into the Apennines; the highest point in the province is the peak of Corno alle Scale (in Lizzano in Belvedere) at 1,945 metres (6,381 ft) above sea level.

=== Climate ===
Bologna has a mid-latitude, four-season subtropical climate (Köppen climate classification: Cfa). Here are other classifications for the climate of this city:

Bologna Climate according to major climate systems
Climatic scheme	Initials	Description
Köppen system	Cfa	Humid subtropical climate
Trewartha system	Do	Temperate oceanic climate
Alisov system	—N/a	Temperate climate
Strahler system	10	Moist continental climate
Thornthwaite system	C2 s B'2 b'3	Moist subhumid mesothermal climate
Neef system	3b	Oceanic-continental transition temperate climate

Annual precipitation is around 650–750 mm (25.5–29.5 in), with the majority generally falling in spring and autumn. Snow is not uncommon between late November and early March; one of the snowiest months of the past decade was February 2012. Here are climate normals for the weather station of Bologna Borgo Panigale (at the airport), unaffected by the heat dome of the city, for both 1961–1990 and 1991–2020 periods, in order to highlight changes between the two periods (snow averages are referred to the city of Bologna, since there is not a complete archive for the Borgo Panigale area):

Climate data for Bologna, Guglielmo Marconi Airport (1991–2020 normals, extremes 1991–2020)
Month	Jan	Feb	Mar	Apr	May	Jun	Jul	Aug	Sep	Oct	Nov	Dec	Year
Record high °C (°F)	21 (70)	25 (77)	27 (81)	31 (88)	35 (95)	38 (100)	40 (104)	40 (104)	35 (95)	30 (86)	24 (75)	19 (66)	40 (104)
Mean maximum °C (°F)	13.7 (56.7)	16.8 (62.2)	22.6 (72.7)	26.1 (79.0)	30.5 (86.9)	34.6 (94.3)	36.6 (97.9)	36.3 (97.3)	31.8 (89.2)	26.4 (79.5)	19.8 (67.6)	14.2 (57.6)	36.6 (97.9)
Mean daily maximum °C (°F)	7.2 (45.0)	9.9 (49.8)	15.1 (59.2)	19.1 (66.4)	23.9 (75.0)	28.5 (83.3)	31.4 (88.5)	31.3 (88.3)	25.7 (78.3)	19.3 (66.7)	12.6 (54.7)	7.7 (45.9)	19.3 (66.8)
Daily mean °C (°F)	3.3 (37.9)	5.2 (41.4)	9.6 (49.3)	13.4 (56.1)	18.2 (64.8)	22.7 (72.9)	25.2 (77.4)	25.1 (77.2)	20.2 (68.4)	14.9 (58.8)	9.0 (48.2)	4.1 (39.4)	14.2 (57.7)
Mean daily minimum °C (°F)	−0.5 (31.1)	0.4 (32.7)	4.0 (39.2)	7.8 (46.0)	12.5 (54.5)	16.8 (62.2)	19.1 (66.4)	19.0 (66.2)	14.6 (58.3)	10.5 (50.9)	5.4 (41.7)	0.5 (32.9)	9.2 (48.5)
Mean minimum °C (°F)	−5.4 (22.3)	−4.9 (23.2)	−1.6 (29.1)	2.6 (36.7)	7.5 (45.5)	11.7 (53.1)	14.4 (57.9)	14 (57)	9.6 (49.3)	5 (41)	−0.7 (30.7)	−5.2 (22.6)	−5.4 (22.3)
Record low °C (°F)	−10 (14)	−17 (1)	−10 (14)	−3 (27)	1 (34)	7 (45)	9 (48)	9 (48)	6 (43)	−3 (27)	−8 (18)	−13 (9)	−17 (1)
Average precipitation mm (inches)	34 (1.3)	56.4 (2.22)	50.3 (1.98)	63.7 (2.51)	60.6 (2.39)	65.6 (2.58)	32.1 (1.26)	35 (1.4)	60.7 (2.39)	75.4 (2.97)	77.2 (3.04)	56.6 (2.23)	667.6 (26.27)
Average precipitation days (≥ 1.0 mm)	5.3	5.8	6.1	7.8	6.9	5.9	3.2	4.1	5.7	6.9	8.2	7.1	73
Average relative humidity (%)	79.2	72.2	67.5	67.2	65.1	62.3	59.1	59.8	66.5	75.6	81	80.7	69.7
Source 1: https://inumeridibolognametropolitana.it/dati-statistici/temperature-e-precipitazioni-stazione-di-bologna-borgo-panigale-dati-mensili
Source 2: https://centrometeobolognese.com

Climate data for Bologna, Guglielmo Marconi Airport (1961–1990 normals, extremes 1961–1990)
Month	Jan	Feb	Mar	Apr	May	Jun	Jul	Aug	Sep	Oct	Nov	Dec	Year
Record high °C (°F)	20 (68)	24.8 (76.6)	25.6 (78.1)	28.4 (83.1)	31.9 (89.4)	35.6 (96.1)	39.6 (103.3)	38.3 (100.9)	34.1 (93.4)	28.2 (82.8)	24 (75)	22.8 (73.0)	39.6 (103.3)
Mean daily maximum °C (°F)	4.8 (40.6)	8.2 (46.8)	13.4 (56.1)	17.8 (64.0)	22.7 (72.9)	26.8 (80.2)	29.9 (85.8)	29.2 (84.6)	25.3 (77.5)	18.9 (66.0)	11.1 (52.0)	5.9 (42.6)	17.8 (64.1)
Daily mean °C (°F)	1.6 (34.9)	4.5 (40.1)	8.7 (47.7)	12.7 (54.9)	17.3 (63.1)	21.2 (70.2)	24.1 (75.4)	23.6 (74.5)	20.1 (68.2)	14.5 (58.1)	7.7 (45.9)	2.8 (37.0)	13.2 (55.8)
Mean daily minimum °C (°F)	−1.5 (29.3)	0.8 (33.4)	3.9 (39.0)	7.6 (45.7)	11.8 (53.2)	15.6 (60.1)	18.2 (64.8)	17.9 (64.2)	14.8 (58.6)	10.1 (50.2)	4.3 (39.7)	−0.3 (31.5)	8.6 (47.5)
Record low °C (°F)	−18.8 (−1.8)	−12.6 (9.3)	−8.6 (16.5)	−1 (30)	0.8 (33.4)	7 (45)	9 (48)	9.7 (49.5)	4.5 (40.1)	0.2 (32.4)	−9 (16)	−13.4 (7.9)	−18.8 (−1.8)
Average precipitation mm (inches)	42.9 (1.69)	44.9 (1.77)	60.4 (2.38)	67.0 (2.64)	65.0 (2.56)	52.6 (2.07)	42.8 (1.69)	57.9 (2.28)	61.0 (2.40)	71.6 (2.82)	81.3 (3.20)	61.0 (2.40)	708.4 (27.9)
Average precipitation days (≥ 1.0 mm)	7	6	8	7	8	7	5	6	5	7	8	7	81
Average snowy days	2.4	1.2	0.5	0.05	0	0	0	0	0	0	0.5	1.7	6.35
Average relative humidity (%)	83	78	70	71	69	68	65	66	69	76	84	84	74
Mean monthly sunshine hours	77.5	96.05	151.9	174	229.4	255	291.4	260.4	201	148.8	81	74.4	2,040.85
Mean daily sunshine hours	2.5	3.4	4.9	5.8	7.4	8.5	9.4	8.4	6.7	4.8	2.7	2.4	5.6
Percentage possible sunshine	27	33	41	43	50	55	62	60	53	44	28	27	44
Source 1:
Source 2: https://centrometeobolognese.com

== Demographics ==
Historical population
Year	Pop.	±%
1861	116,874	—
1871	118,217	+1.1%
1881	126,178	+6.7%
1901	153,271	+21.5%
1911	179,311	+17.0%
1921	212,754	+18.7%
1931	249,226	+17.1%
1936	281,162	+12.8%
1951	340,526	+21.1%
1961	444,872	+30.6%
1971	490,528	+10.3%
1981	459,080	−6.4%
1991	404,378	−11.9%
2001	371,217	−8.2%
2011	371,337	+0.0%
2021	387,842	+4.4%
Source: ISTAT

As of 2026, the population is 391,473, of which 48.0% are males, and 52.0% are females. Minors make up 13.4% of the population, and seniors make up 24.6%.

=== Immigration ===
As of 2025, immigrants make up 18.2% of the population. The 5 largest foreign countries of birth are Moldova, Bangladesh, Romania, Pakistan, and Philippines.

== Government ==
=== Municipal government ===
The legislative body of the municipality is the City Council (Consiglio Comunale), which is composed by 48 councillors elected every five years with a corrected proportional system (granting the majority to the list or alliance of lists which receives more votes), contextually to the mayoral elections. The executive body is the City Committee (Giunta Comunale), composed by 12 assessors, that is nominated and presided over by a directly elected mayor. The current mayor of Bologna is Matteo Lepore (PD), elected on 4 October 2021 with 61.9% of the votes.

The municipality of Bologna is subdivided into six administrative boroughs (quartieri), down from the former nine before the 2015 administrative reform. Each borough is governed by a council (Consiglio) and a president, elected contextually to the city mayor. The urban organization is governed by the Italian Constitution (art. 114). The boroughs have the power to advise the mayor with nonbinding opinions on a large spectrum of topics (environment, construction, public health, local markets) and exercise the functions delegated to them by the City Council; in addition, they are supplied with an autonomous founding to finance local activities.

=== Provincial and regional government ===
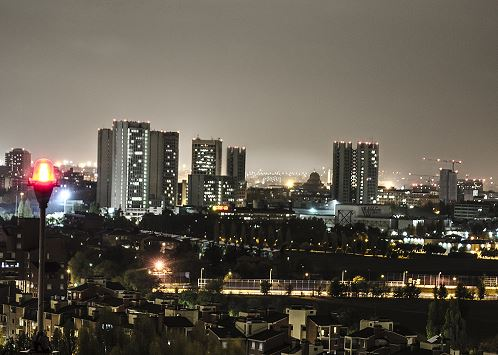
Fiera District, seat of the regional government of Emilia-Romagna

Bologna is the capital of the eponymous metropolitan city and of Emilia-Romagna, one of the twenty regions of Italy. While the province of Bologna has a population of 1,007,644, making it the twelfth most populated province of Italy, Emilia-Romagna ranks as the sixth most populated region of Italy, with about 4.5 million inhabitants, more than 7% of the national total. The seat of the regional government is Fiera District, a tower complex designed by Japanese architect Kenzo Tange in 1985.

According to the last governmental dispositions concerning administrative reorganisation, the urban area of Bologna is one of the 15 metropolitan municipalities (città metropolitane), new administrative bodies fully operative since 1 January 2015. The new Metro municipalities, giving large urban areas the administrative powers of a province, are conceived for improving the performance of local administrations and to slash local spending by better co-ordinating the municipalities in providing basic services (including transport, school and social programs) and environment protection. In this policy framework, the mayor of Bologna is designated to exercise the functions of a metropolitan mayor (sindaco metropolitano), presiding over a Metropolitan Council formed by 18 mayors of municipalities within the Metro municipality.

The Metropolitan City of Bologna is headed by the metropolitan mayor (sindaco metropolitano) and by the Metropolitan Council (Consiglio metropolitano). Since 11 October 2021 Matteo Lepore, as mayor of the capital city, has been the mayor of the Metropolitan City.

== Cityscape ==
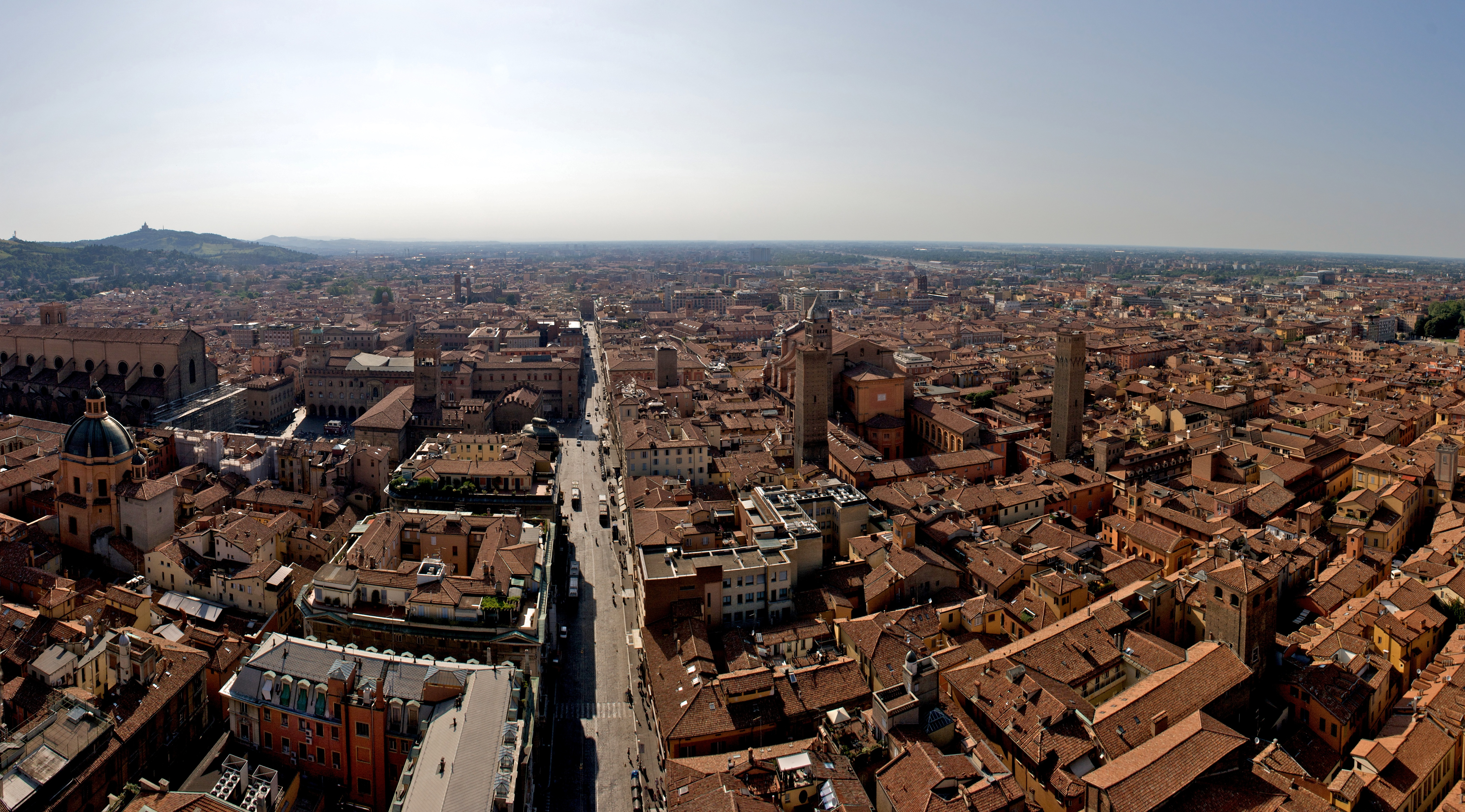
Panoramic view of central Bologna

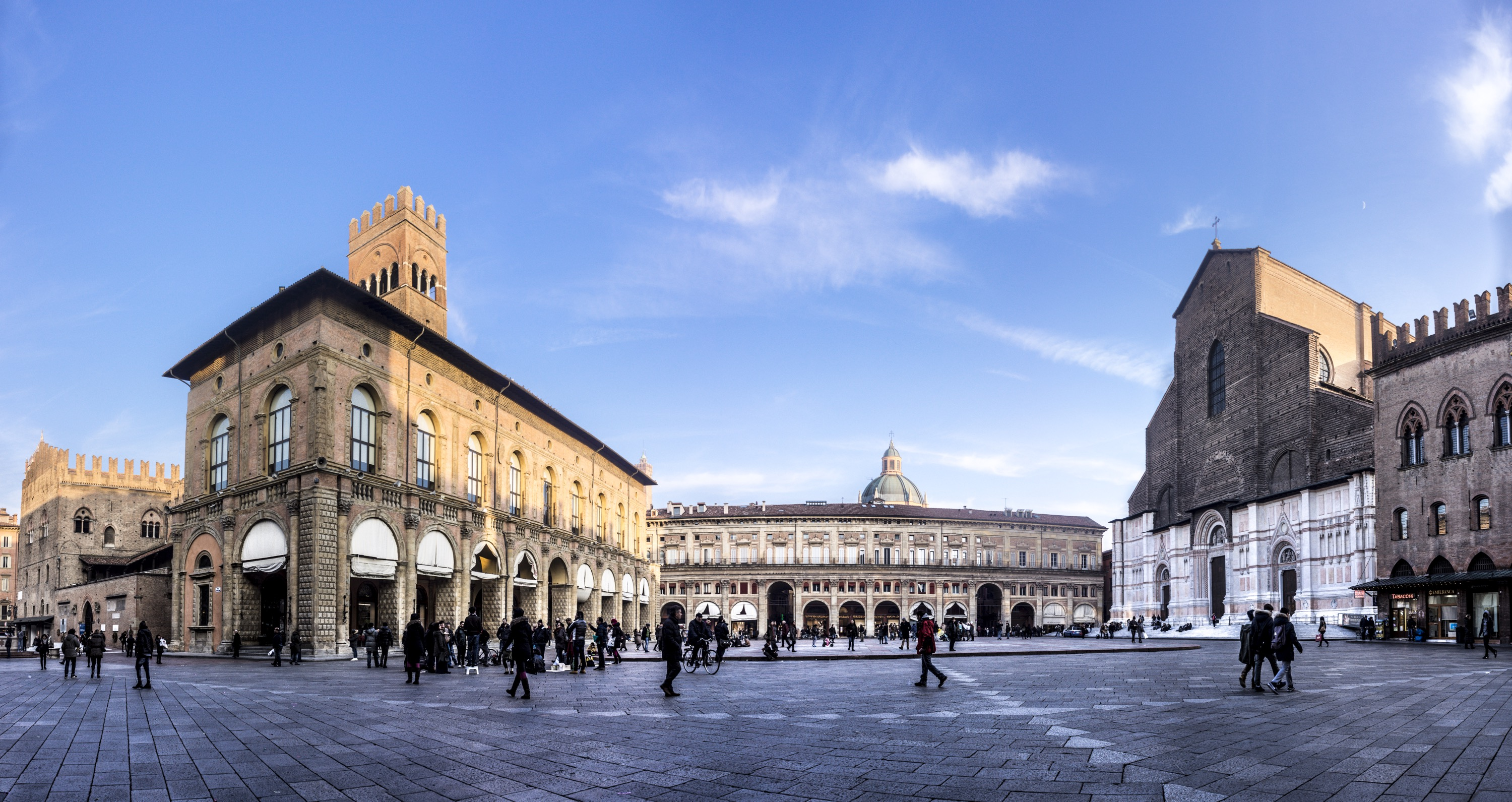
Piazza Maggiore, with San Petronio Basilica, Palazzo dei Banchi, and Palazzo del Podestà

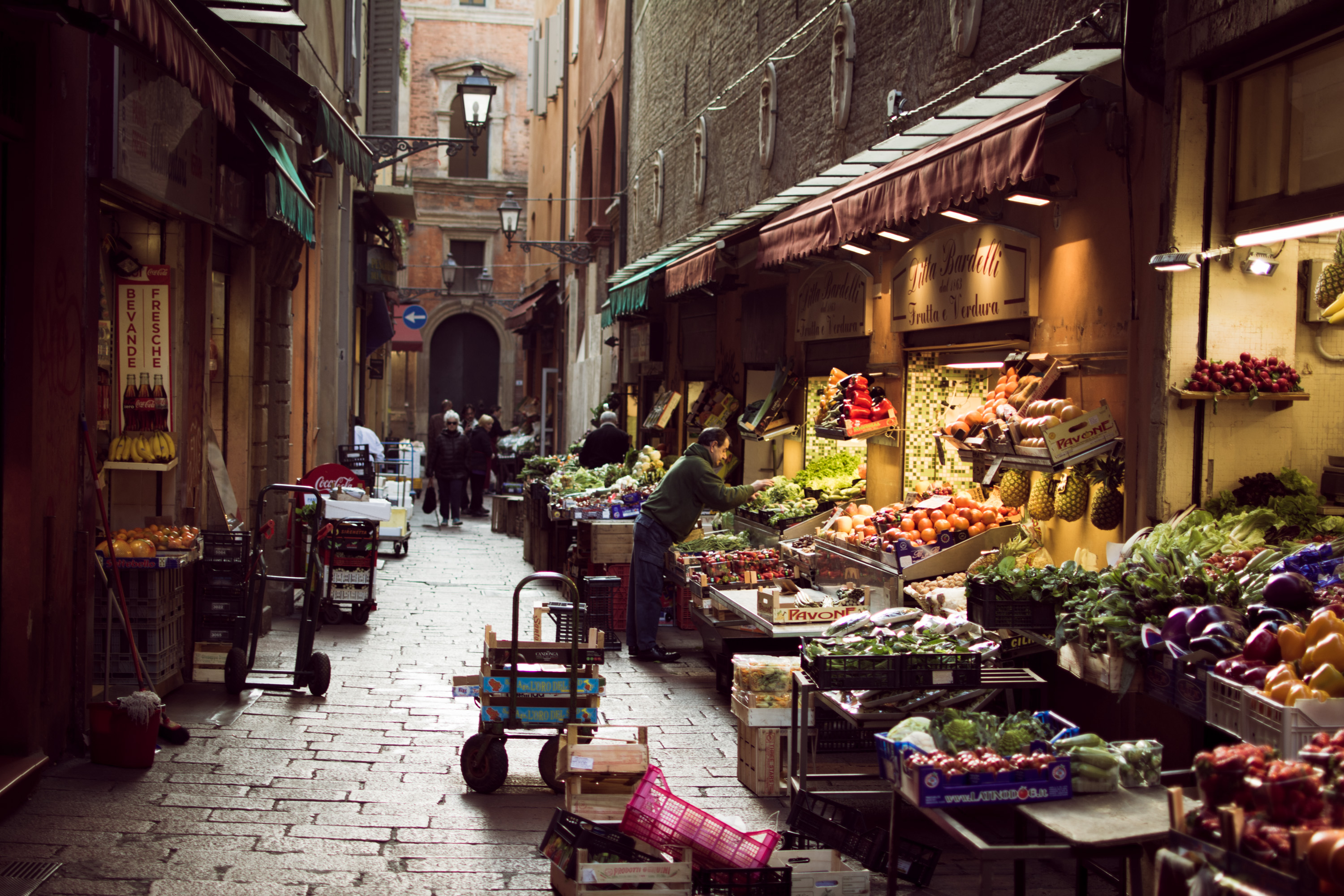
The colourful open-air market of Via Pescherie Vecchie

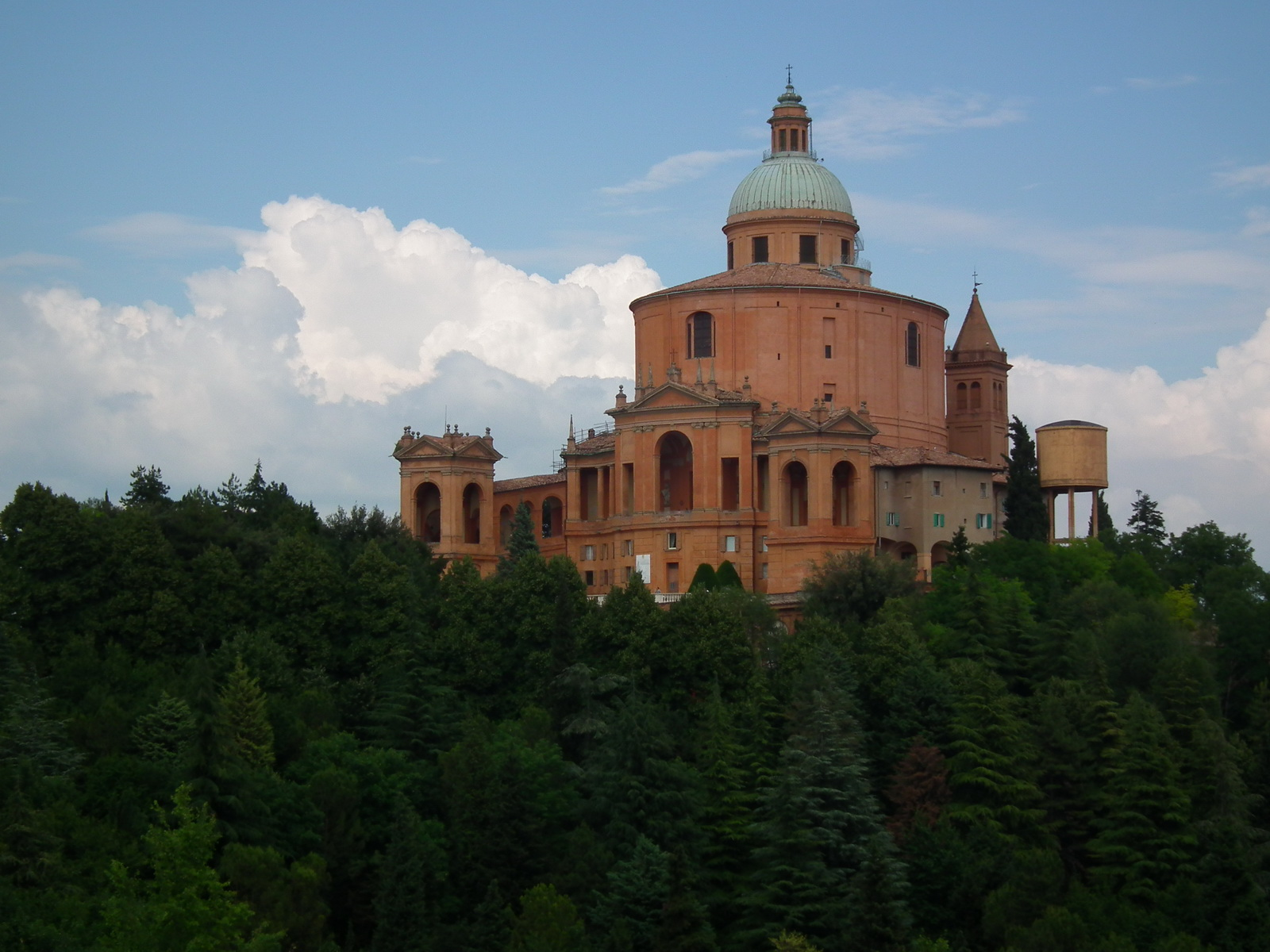
Sanctuary of the Madonna di San Luca

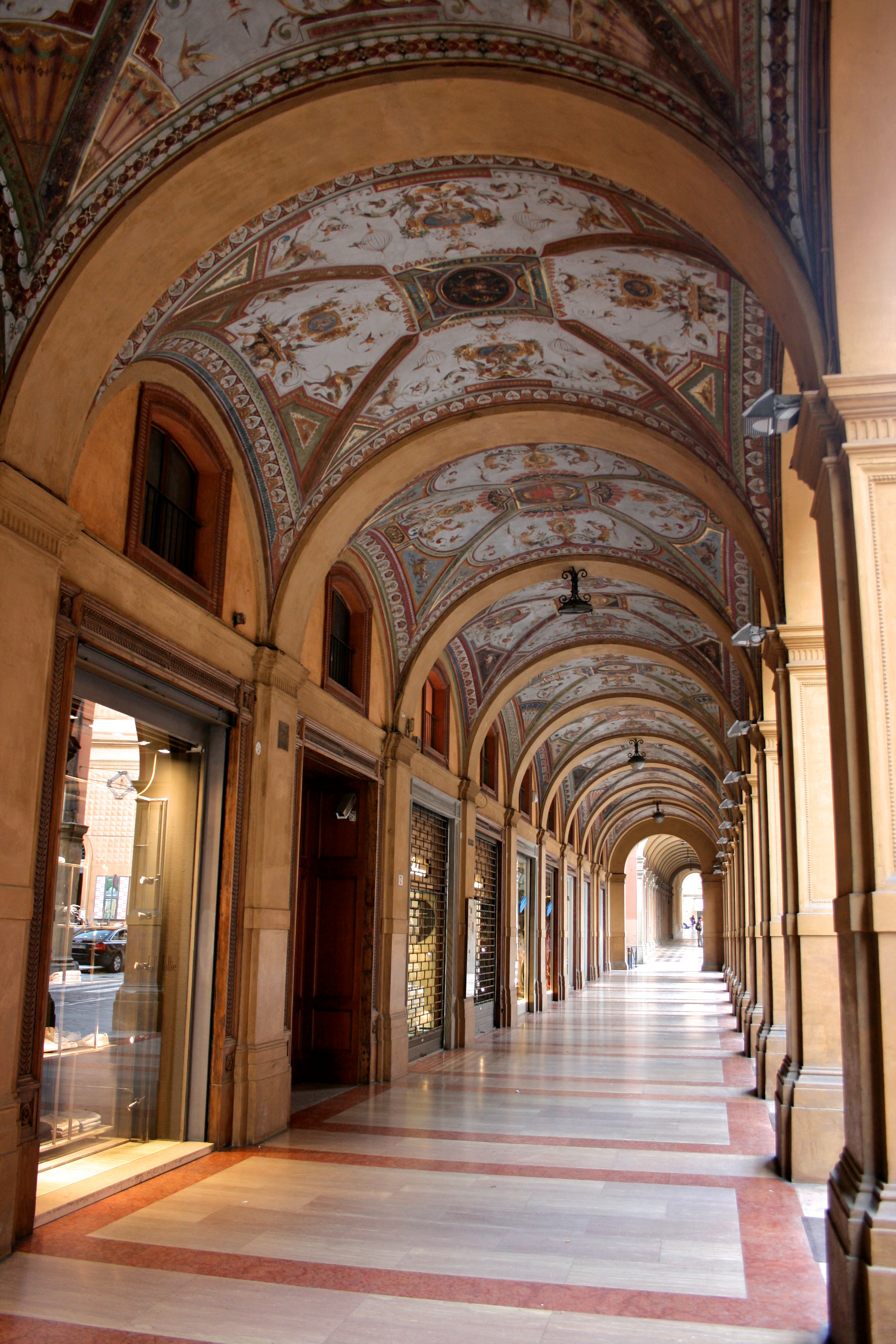
The porticoes of Bologna are a symbol of the city.

Until the late 19th century, when a large-scale urban renewal project was undertaken, Bologna was one of the few remaining large walled cities in Europe; to this day and despite having suffered considerable bombing damage in 1944, Bologna's 142 hectares (350 acres) historic centre is Europe's second largest, containing an immense wealth of important medieval, renaissance, and baroque artistic monuments.

Bologna developed along the Via Emilia as an Etruscan and later Roman colony; the Via Emilia still runs straight through the city under the changing names of Strada Maggiore, Rizzoli, Ugo Bassi, and San Felice. Due to its Roman heritage, the central streets of Bologna, today largely pedestrianized, follow the grid pattern of the Roman settlement. The original Roman ramparts were supplanted by a high medieval system of fortifications, remains of which are still visible, and finally by a third and final set of ramparts built in the 13th century, of which numerous sections survive. No more than twenty medieval defensive towers remain out of up to 180 that were built in the 12th and 13th centuries before the arrival of unified civic government. The most famous of the towers of Bologna are the central Due Torri (Asinelli and Garisenda), whose iconic leaning forms provide a popular symbol of the town.

The cityscape is further enriched by its elegant and extensive porticoes, for which the city is famous. In total, there are some 38 kilometres (24 miles) of porticoes in the city's historical centre (over 45 km (28 mi) in the city proper), which make it possible to walk for long distances sheltered from the elements.

The Portico di San Luca is possibly the world's longest. It connects Porta Saragozza (one of the twelve gates of the ancient walls built in the Middle Ages, which circled a 7.5 km (4.7 mi) part of the city) with the Sanctuary of the Madonna di San Luca, a church begun in 1723 on the site of an 11th century edifice which had already been enlarged in the 14th century, prominently located on a hill (289 metres (948 feet)) overlooking the town, which is one of Bologna's main landmarks. The winding 666 vault arcades, almost four kilometres (3,796 m or 12,454 ft) long, effectively links San Luca, as the church is commonly called, to the city centre. Its porticos provide shelter for the traditional procession which every year since 1433 has carried a Byzantine icon of the Madonna with Child attributed to Luke the Evangelist down to the Bologna Cathedral during the Feast of the Ascension.

In 2021, the porticoes were named as a UNESCO World Heritage Site.

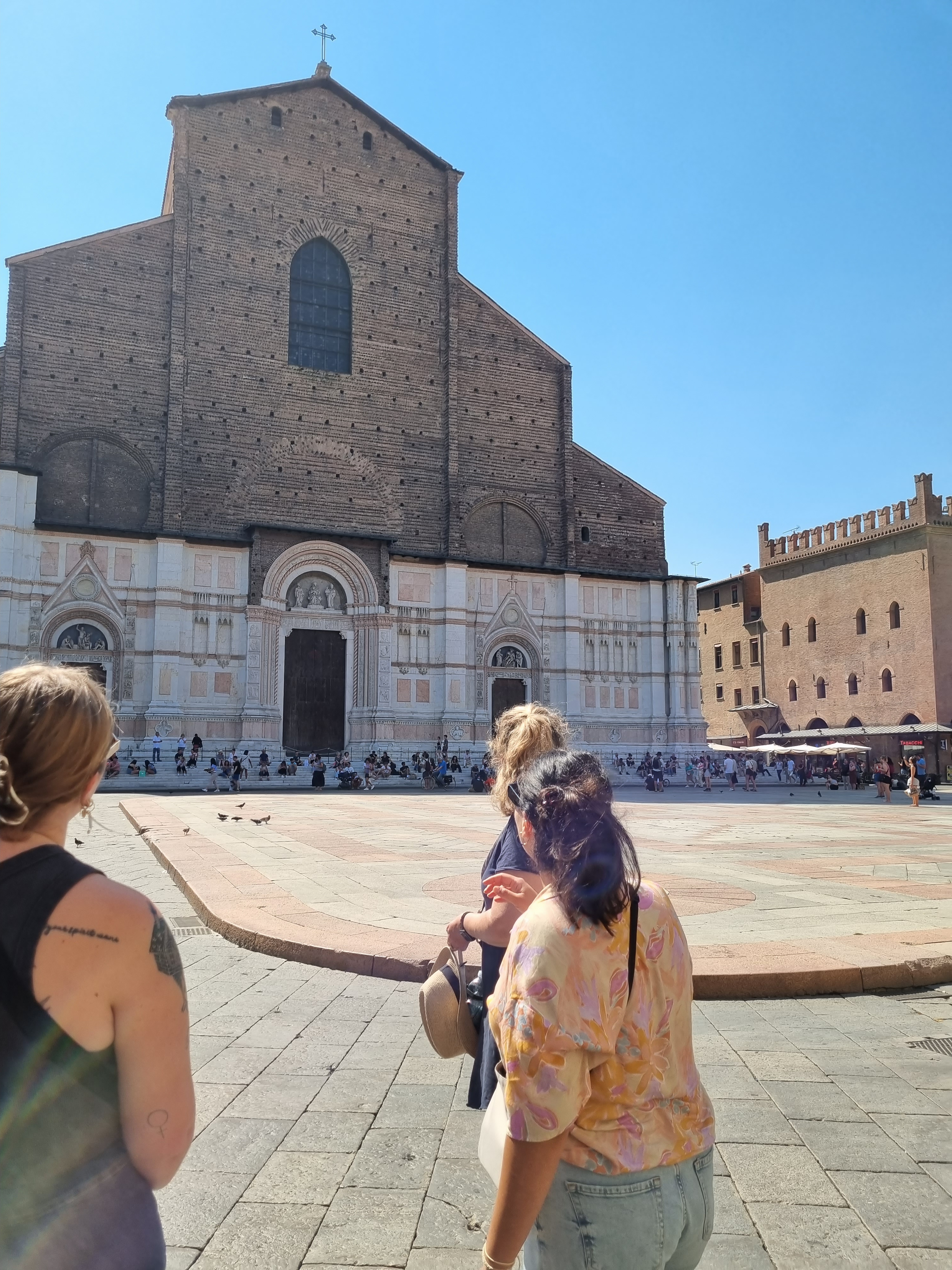
View from Via Pescherie Vecchie of San Petronio Basilica showing the different building materials used at different times in its construction

San Petronio Basilica, built between 1388 and 1479 (but still unfinished), is the tenth-largest church in the world by volume, 132 metres long and 66 metres wide, while the vault reaches 45 metres inside and 51 metres in the facade. With its volume of 258,000 m^{3}, it is the largest (Gothic or otherwise) church built of bricks of the world. The Basilica of Saint Stephen and its sanctuary are among the oldest structures in Bologna, having been built starting from the 8th century, according to the tradition on the site of an ancient temple dedicated to Egyptian goddess Isis. The Basilica of Saint Dominic is an example of Romanic architecture from the 13th century, enriched by the monumental tombs of great Bolognese glossators Rolandino de'Passeggeri and Egidio Foscherari. Basilicas of St Francis, Santa Maria dei Servi and San Giacomo Maggiore are other magnificent examples of 14th century architecture, the latter also featuring Renaissance artworks such as the Bentivoglio Altarpiece by Lorenzo Costa. Finally, the Church of San Michele in Bosco is a 15th century religious complex located on a hill not far from the city's historical center.

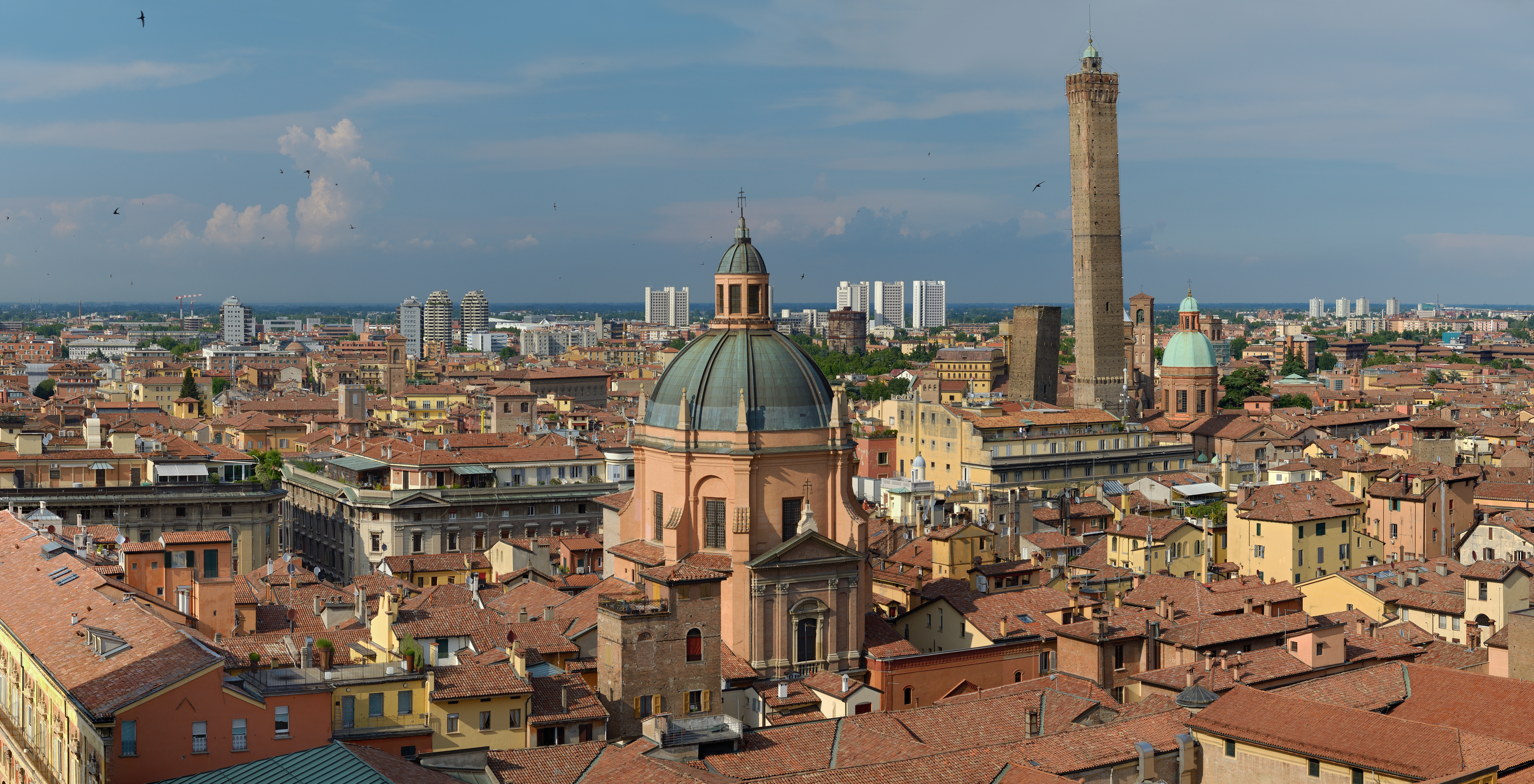
View from the top of the Basilica di San Petronio: the dome of Santuario di Santa Maria della Vita dominates the foreground; the Asinelli (higher) and Garisenda towers (Due Torri) are seen on the right.

== Culture ==
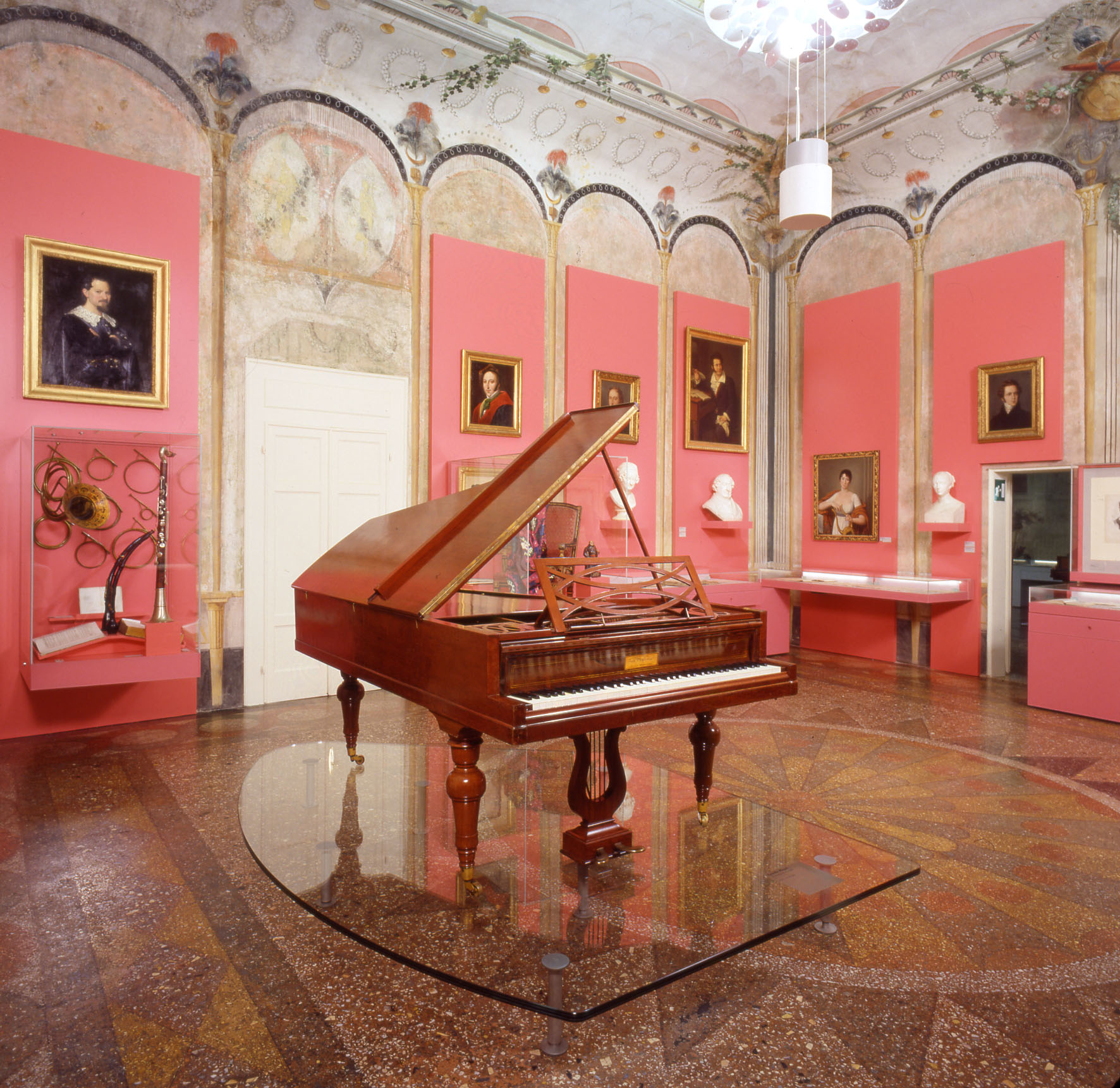
The International museum and library of music displays ancient musical instruments and unique musical scores from the 16th to the 20th centuries.

Over the centuries, Bologna has acquired many nicknames: "the fat" (la grassa) refers to its cuisine, in which the most famous specialities are prepared using rich meats (especially pork), egg pasta and dairy products, such as butter and Parmesan. Another nickname that has been given to the city is "the red" (la rossa), which was originally used as a reference to the colour of the buildings in the city centre, has later become connected with the communist ideology supported by the majority of the population, in particular after World War II: until the election of a centre-right mayor in 1999, the city was renowned as a bastion of the Italian Communist Party. The centre-left regained power again in the 2004 mayoral elections, with the election of Sergio Cofferati. It was one of the first European cities to experiment with the concept of free public transport. Bologna has also two other nicknames: the first one, "the towered" (la turrita) refers to the high number of medieval towers that can be found in the city, even if today only 24 towers are still standing. The second one, "the learned" (la dotta) is a reference to its university.

=== University ===
Bologna's university was founded in 1088 and it is considered the oldest university in the world. According to the QS University Rankings, Bologna university is the 3rd-ranked Italian university and the 138th-ranked in the world.

The large number of students coming from all over Italy and the world (there are several campuses of foreign universities in Bologna, including Johns Hopkins University, Dickinson College, Indiana University, Brown University, the University of California and more) has a considerable effect on everyday life. While it contributes to livening up the city centre (an area in which the average age of the residents is very high) and it also helps to promote cultural initiatives, on the other hand, it creates public order and waste management problems that stem from the lively nightlife of the university district.

=== Entertainment and performing arts ===
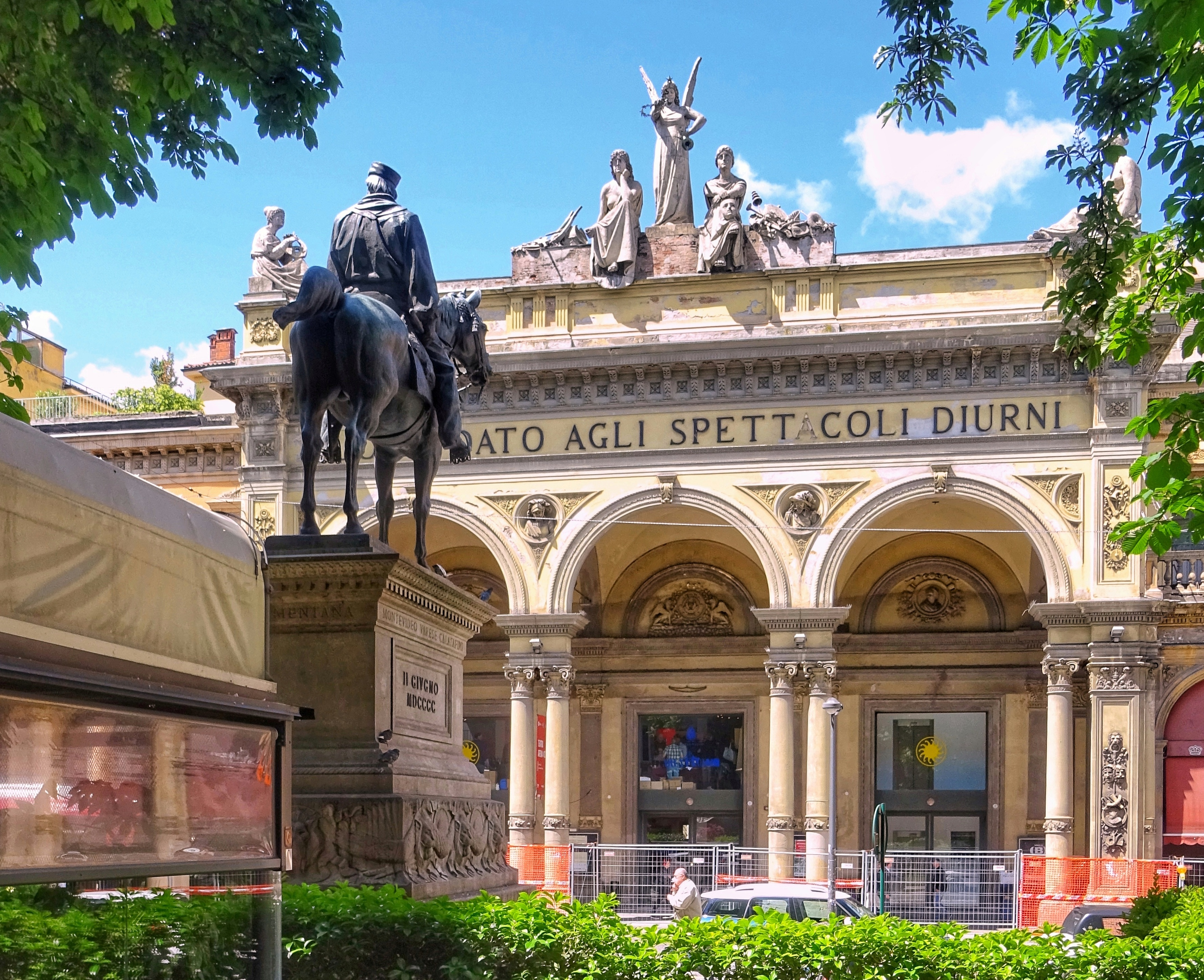
Façade of Arena del Sole theatre

The city of Bologna became a UNESCO City of Music on 26 May 2006. According to UNESCO, "As the first Italian city to be appointed to the Network, Bologna has demonstrated a rich musical tradition that is continuing to evolve as a vibrant factor of contemporary life and creation. It has also shown a strong commitment to promoting music as an important vehicle for inclusion in the fight against racism and in an effort to encourage economic and social development. Fostering a wide range of genres from classical to electronic, jazz, folk and opera, Bologna offers its citizens a musical vitality that deeply infiltrates the city's professional, academic, social and cultural facets."

The theatre was a popular form of entertainment in Bologna until the 16th century. The first public theatre was the Teatro alla Scala, active since 1547 in Palazzo del Podestà. An important figure of Italian Bolognese theatre was Alfredo Testoni, the playwright and author of Cardinal Lambertini, which has had great theatrical success since 1905, repeated on screen by the Bolognese actor Gino Cervi. In 1998, the City of Bologna initiated the project "Bologna dei Teatri" ('Bologna of the Theatres'), an association of the major theatrical facilities in the city. This is a circuit of theatres which offer diverse theatrical opportunities, ranging from Bolognese dialect to contemporary dance, but with a communications strategy and promoting unity. Specifically, the shows on the bill in various theatres participating in the project are advertised weekly through a single poster. Bologna's opera house is the Teatro Comunale di Bologna. The Orchestra Mozart, whose music director was Claudio Abbado until his death in 2014, was created in 2004.

Bologna hosts a number of international music, art, dance and film festivals, including Angelica, Bologna and Contemporanea (festivals on contemporary music), Bolognafestival (international classical music festival), Bologna Jazz Festival, Biografilm Festival (devoted to biographical movies), BilBolBul (a comics festival), Danza Urbana (a street contemporary dance festival), F.I.S.Co (festival on contemporary art, now merged into Live Arts Week), Future Film Festival (animation and special effects), Il Cinema Ritrovato (film festival about rare and forgotten movies), Live Arts Week, Gender Bender (festival on gender identity, sexual orientation, and body representation), Homework festival (electronic music festival), Human Rights Film Festival, Some Prefer Cake (lesbian film festival), Zecchino d'Oro (a children's song contest).

=== Cuisine ===
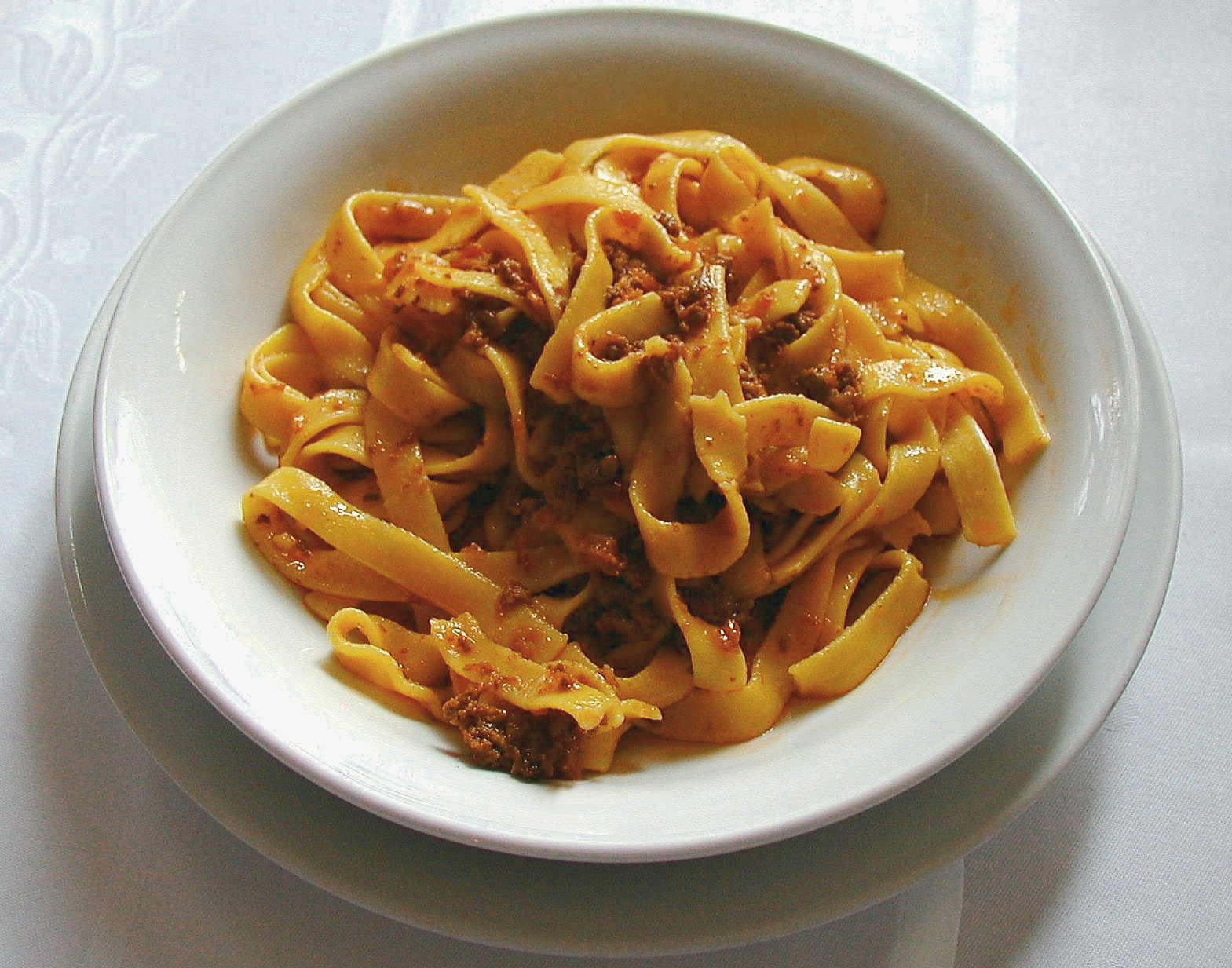
Tagliatelle al ragù, as served in Bologna

Bologna is renowned for its culinary tradition. It is the home of the famous Bolognese sauce, a meat-based pasta sauce. In Italy, it is called ragù and is substantially different from the variety found worldwide. In Bologna, the sauce is served primarily with tagliatelle, and serving it with spaghetti is considered odd.

Situated in the fertile Po Valley, the rich local cuisine depends heavily on meats and cheeses. As in all of Emilia-Romagna, the production of cured pork meats such as prosciutto, mortadella and salumi is an important part of the local food industry. Well-regarded nearby vineyards include Pignoletto dei Colli Bolognesi, Lambrusco di Modena and Sangiovese di Romagna. Tagliatelle with ragù, tortellini served in broth, lasagna and mortadella Bologna are among the local specialties.

Traditional Bolognese desserts are often linked to holidays, such as fave dei morti, multi-coloured almond paste cookies made for All Saints' Day, jam-filled raviole cookies that are served on Saint Joseph's Day, and carnival sweets known as sfrappole, a light and delicate fried pastry topped with powder sugar, certosino or panspeziale ('carthusian' or 'apothecary-cake'), a spicy cake served on Christmas. Torta di riso, a custard-like cake made of almonds, rice and amaretto, is made throughout the year, as well as zuppa inglese.

== Economy ==
Unipol Tower, at 127 m (417 ft), is the city's tallest building.

In terms of total GDP, the Metropolitan City of Bologna generated a value of about €35 billion ($40.6 billion) in 2017, equivalent to €34,251 ($40,165) per capita, the third highest figure among Italian provinces (after Milan and Bolzano/Bozen).

The economy of Bologna is characterized by a flourishing industrial sector, traditionally centered on the transformation of agricultural and zootechnical products (Eridania, Granarolo, Segafredo Zanetti, Conserve Italia), machinery (Coesia, IMA, Sacmi), construction equipment (Maccaferri); energy (Hera Group), automotive (Ducati, Lamborghini), footwear, textile, engineering, chemical, printing and publishing (Cappelli, il Mulino, Monrif Group, Zanichelli).

In particular, Bologna is considered the centre of the so-called "packaging valley", an area well known for its high concentration of firms specialised in the manufacturing of automatic packaging machines (Coesia, IMA). Furthermore, Bologna is well known for its dense network of cooperatives, a feature that dates back to the social struggles of farmers and workers in the 1800s and that today produces up to a third of its GDP and occupies 265,000 people in the Emilia-Romagna region.

== Transport ==
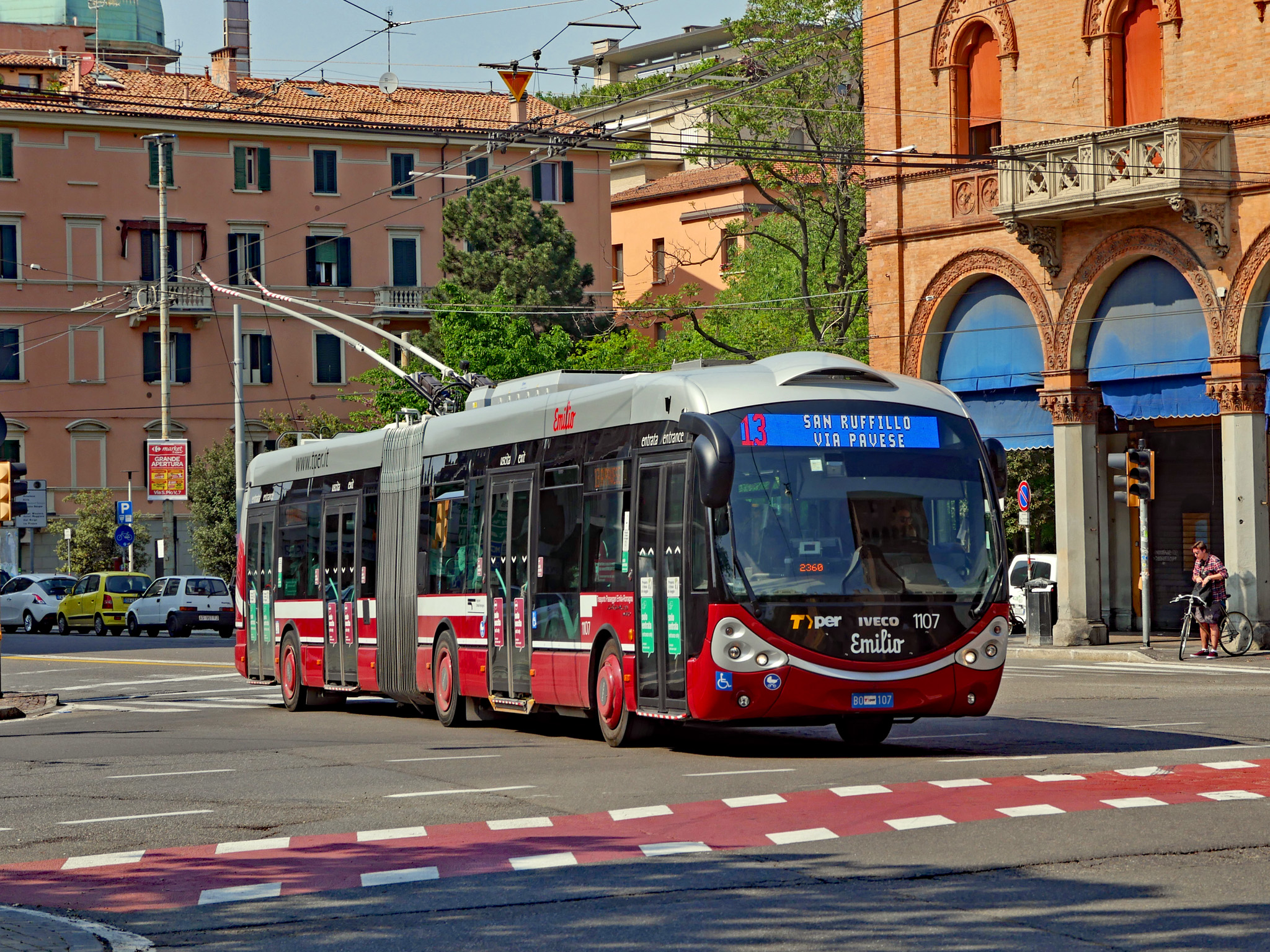
A Trolleybus of the urban trolleybus network managed by TPER, photographed in Via Saffi

The Bologna Guglielmo Marconi Airport is the seventh busiest Italian airport for passenger traffic (11 million passengers in 2025).

Bologna Centrale railway station is one of Italy's most important train hubs thanks to the city's strategic location as a crossroad between north–south and east–west routes. It serves 58 million passengers annually. The city hosts several minor railway stations (see List of railway stations in Bologna).

Bologna San Donato classification yard, with 33 railway tracks, used to be the largest freight hub in Italy by size and traffic. Since 2018, it has been repurposed as the Bologna San Donato railway test circuit.

The city is also served by a large network of public bus lines, including trolleybus lines, operated since 2012 by Trasporto Passeggeri Emilia-Romagna (TPER).

As of May 2023, the first line of the new Bologna tramway is under construction. Overall, a four-line tramway network is planned.

The large commuter rail service centred on Bologna is branded as the Bologna metropolitan railway service.

=== Public transport statistics ===
The average length of time people spend commuting with public transit in Bologna, for example to and from work, on a weekday is 53 min. 9% of public transit riders ride for more than 2 hours every day. The average length of time people wait at a stop or station for public transit is 12 min, while 16% of riders wait for over 20 minutes on average every day. The average distance people usually ride in a single trip with public transit is 5.4 km (3.4 mi), while 7% travel for over 12 km (7.5 mi) in a single direction.

== Education ==
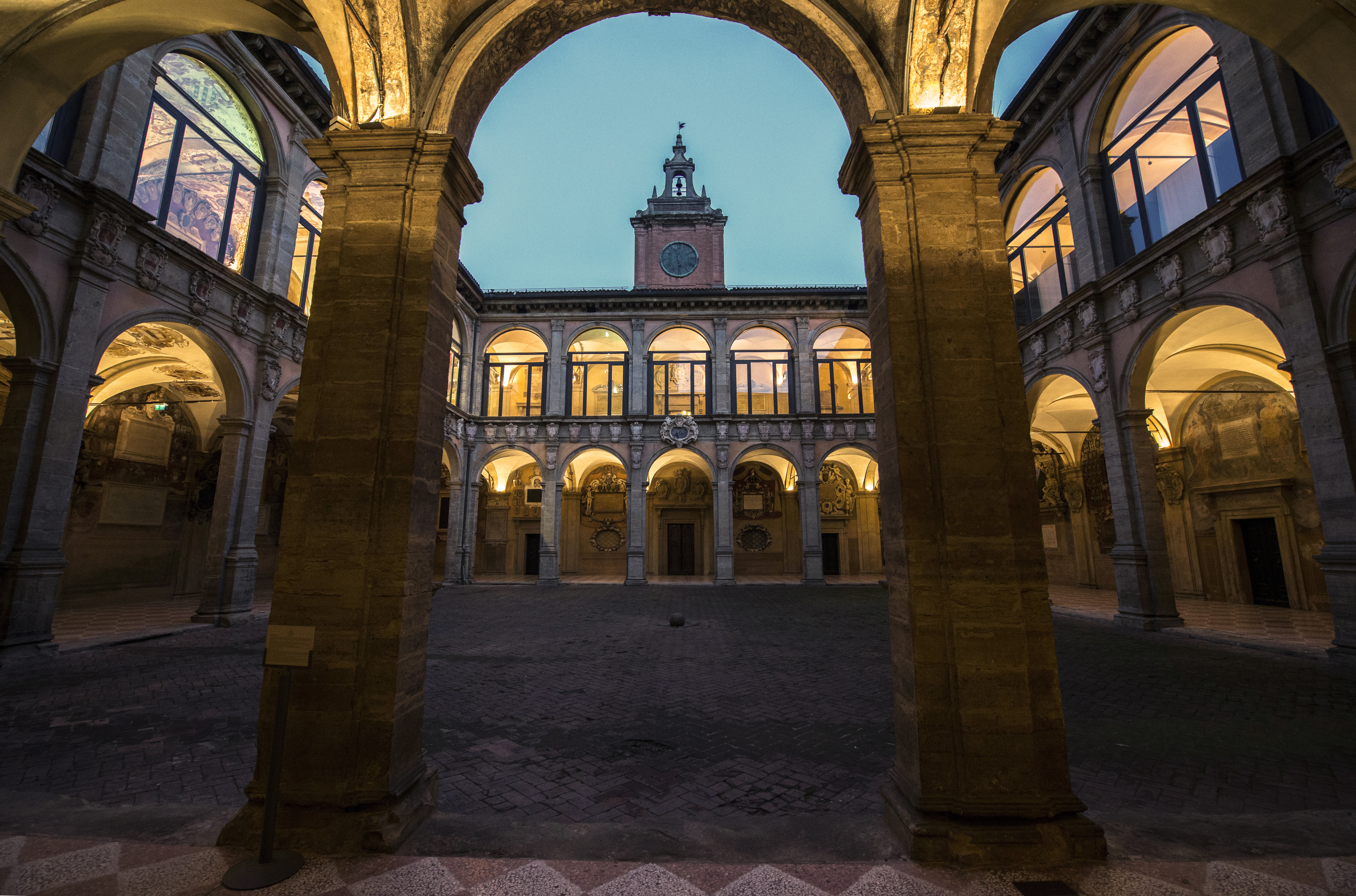
Bologna University, established in AD 1088, is the world's oldest university in continuous operation.

The University of Bologna, conventionally said to have been founded in 1088 by glossators Irnerius and Pepo, is the oldest university in continuous operation, and the first university in the sense of a higher-learning and degree-awarding institute, as the word universitas was coined at its foundation, as well as one of the leading academic institutions in Italy and Europe. It was an important centre of European intellectual life during the Middle Ages, attracting scholars from Italy and throughout Europe. The Studium, as it was originally known, began as a loosely organized teaching system with each master collecting fees from students on an individual basis. The location of the early university was thus spread throughout the city, with various colleges being founded to support students of a specific nationality.

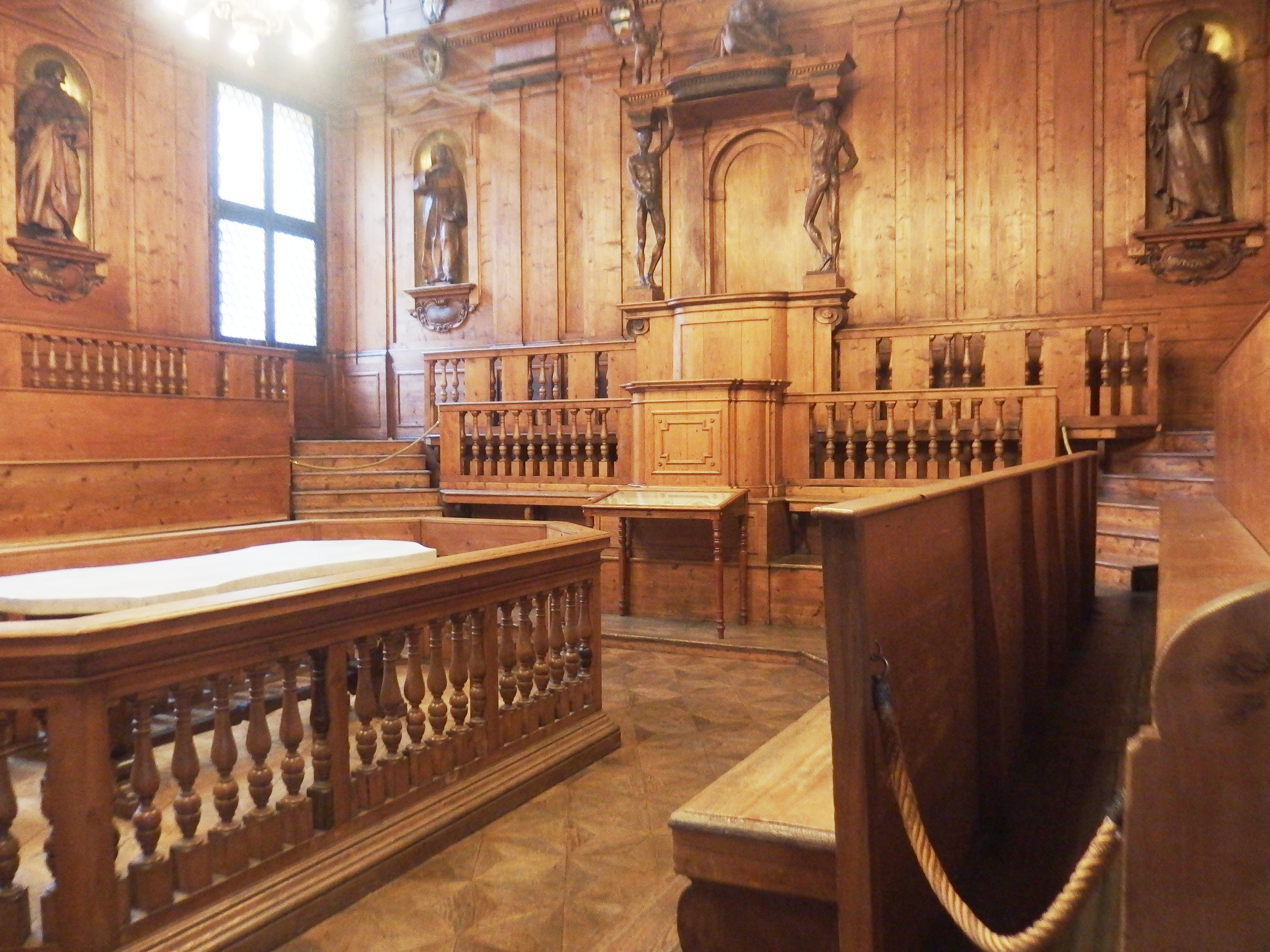
Anatomical theatre of the Archiginnasio, dating from 1637

In the Napoleonic era, the headquarters of the university were moved to their present location on Via Zamboni, in the northeastern sector of the city centre. Today, the university's 11 schools, 33 departments, and 93 libraries are spread across the city and include four subsidiary campuses in nearby Cesena, Forlì, Ravenna, and Rimini. Noteworthy students present at the university in centuries past included Dante, Petrarch, Thomas Becket, Pope Nicholas V, Erasmus of Rotterdam, Peter Martyr Vermigli, and Copernicus. Laura Bassi, appointed in 1732, became the first woman to officially teach at a university in Europe. In more recent history, Luigi Galvani, the discoverer of bioelectromagnetics, and Guglielmo Marconi, the pioneer of radio technology, also worked at the university. The University of Bologna remains one of the most respected and dynamic post-secondary educational institutions in Italy. To this day, Bologna is still very much a university town, with over 80,000 enrolled students in 2015. This community includes a great number of Erasmus, Socrates, and overseas students. The university's botanical garden, the Orto Botanico dell'Università di Bologna, was established in 1568; it is the fourth oldest in Europe.

Johns Hopkins University maintains its Bologna Center in the city, which hosts one of the overseas campuses of the School of Advanced International Studies (SAIS). SAIS Bologna was founded in 1955 as the first campus of a US post-graduate school to open in Europe. It was inspired by Marshall Plan efforts to build a cultural bridge between America and Europe. Today, the Bologna Center also hosts the Associazione italo-americana "Luciano Finelli", which supports cross-cultural awareness and exchange between Italy and the United States.

The Eastern College Consortium (E.C.Co.), comprising Vassar College, Wellesley College, and Wesleyan University, offers a study abroad program in the city in association with the University of Bologna. Dickinson College, Indiana University, Brown University, and the University of California also have campuses or antennas in the city.

In addition, Bologna hosts a music school, Conservatorio Giovanni Battista Martini, established in 1804, and an art school, Accademia di Belle Arti di Bologna, founded in 1802. Both institutions were born as part of the reforms introduced by Napoleon Bonaparte.

== Sport ==
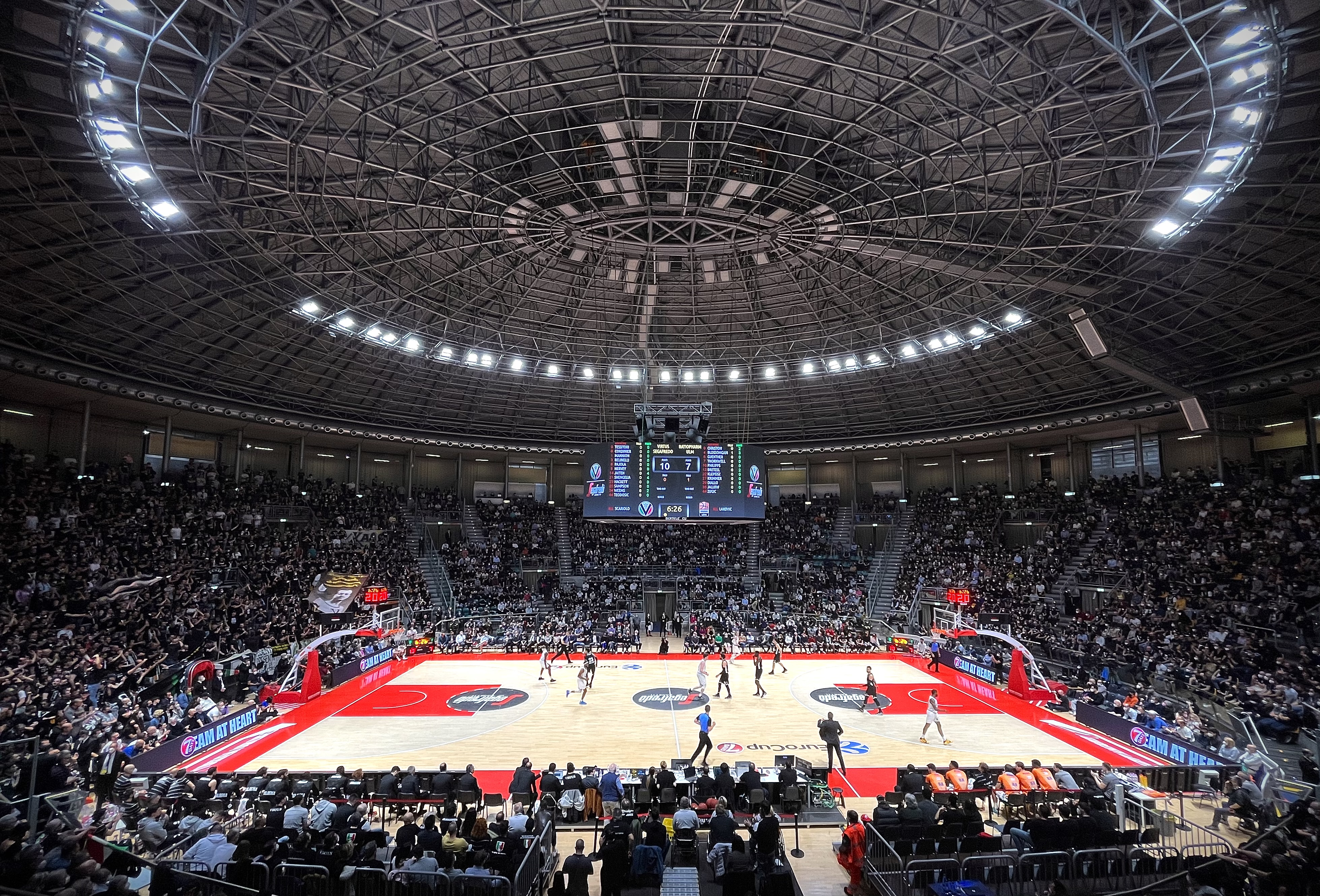
The PalaDozza, Bologna's historic basketball arena

In Bologna, unlike the vast majority of Italian cities, basketball is the most followed and practiced sport. In fact, the sporting nickname for Bologna is Basket City in reference to the successes of the town's two rival historic basketball clubs, Virtus and Fortitudo. Of the two, the former has won, among others, 17 Italian basketball championships, two EuroLeagues, one EuroCup and one FIBA Saporta Cup, making them one of the most successful European basketball clubs; the latter has won two league titles, in 2000 and 2005. The Italian Basketball League, which operates both Serie A and Serie A2, has its headquarters in Bologna. There are two indoor arenas in the city: PalaDozza is the oldest, with a capacity of 5,570 seats, while Virtus Arena is a temporary venue with a capacity of 9,980 seats. A third arena with a capacity of 11,000 seats, the Unipol Arena, is located in the neighbouring town of Casalecchio di Reno.

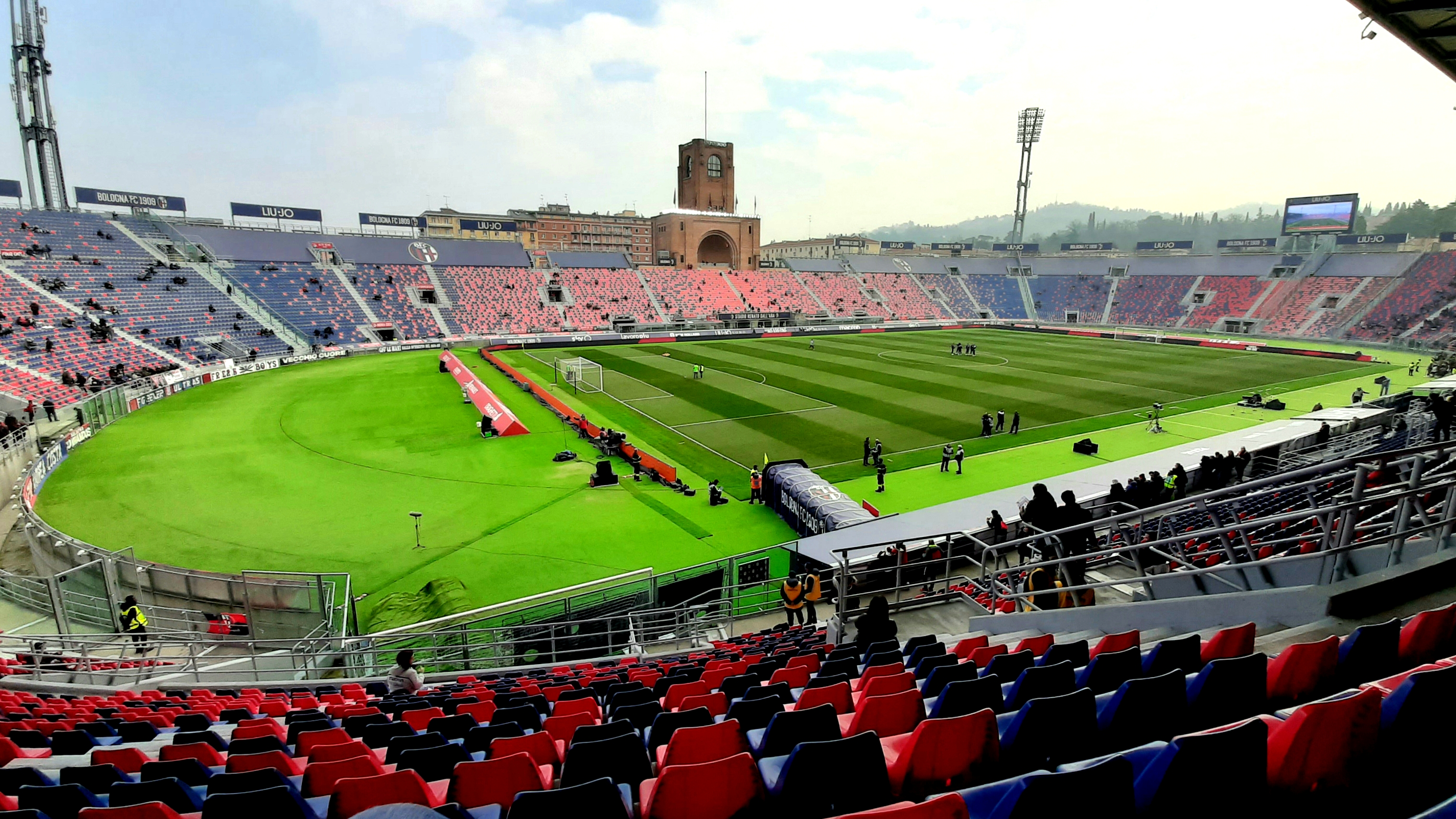
The 32,000-capacity Stadio Renato Dall'Ara is the home of Bologna FC 1909.

Football also has a strong tradition in Bologna. The city's main club, Bologna FC 1909, have won seven Italian league championships (the latest in 1963–64), which makes them the sixth most successful team in the history of the league; in addition, they have won three Coppa Italia titles, the latest of which came in the 2024–2025 season. In their 1930s heyday Bologna FC was known as "Lo squadrone che tremare il mondo fa" ('The Team that Shakes the World'). The club play at the 38,000-capacity Stadio Renato Dall'Ara, which has hosted the Italian national team in both football and rugby union, as well as the San Marino national football team. It was also a venue at the 1990 FIFA World Cup.

Rugby union is also present in the city: Rugby Bologna 1928 was one of the first rugby union clubs established in Italy and was the first club affiliated to the Italian rugby union federation. As of 2026 it is Italy's oldest rugby union club still in operation. The club took part in the top tier of the Italian championship for the first 25 years of their history, never winning the title but finishing as runners-up several times; they returned to the top division in the late 1990s and faced serious financial problems which led to their relegation and near disappearance.

Gianni Falchi Stadium is a baseball stadium located in Bologna. It is home to the home games of Fortitudo Baseball Bologna, in the Italian Baseball League.

== Notable people ==
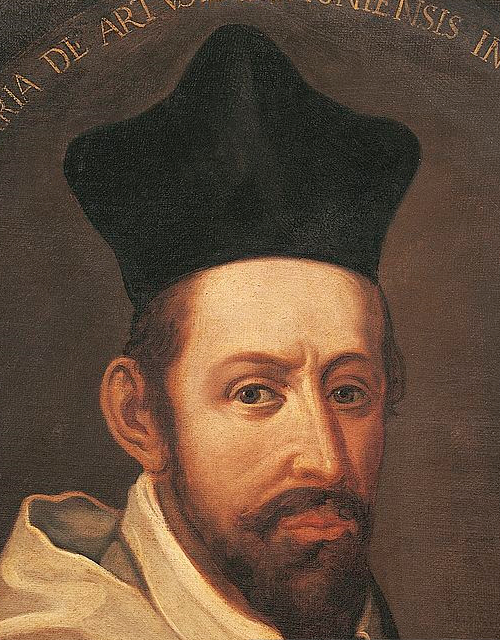
Giovanni Artusi

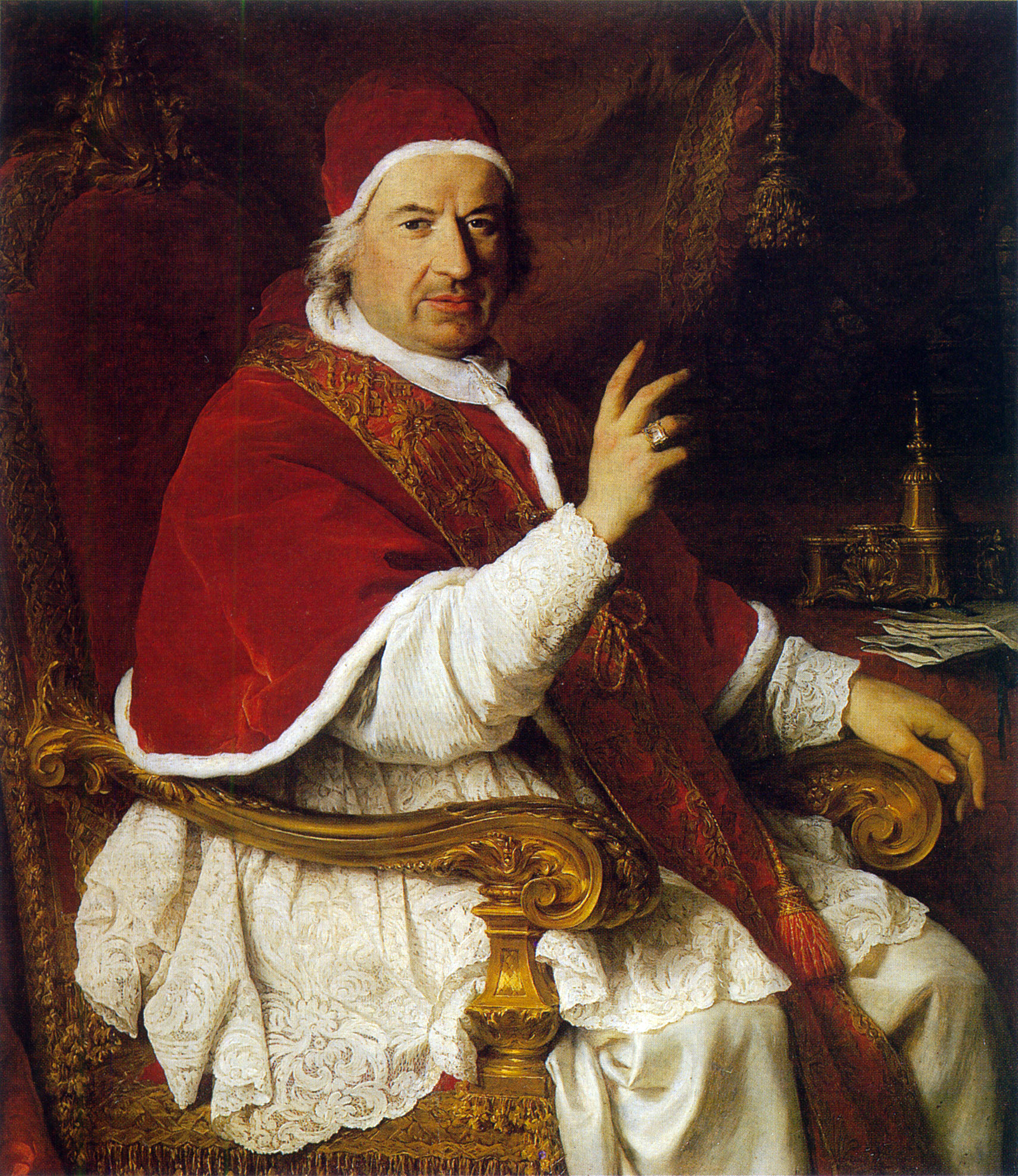
Pope Benedict XIV, born in Bologna in 1675

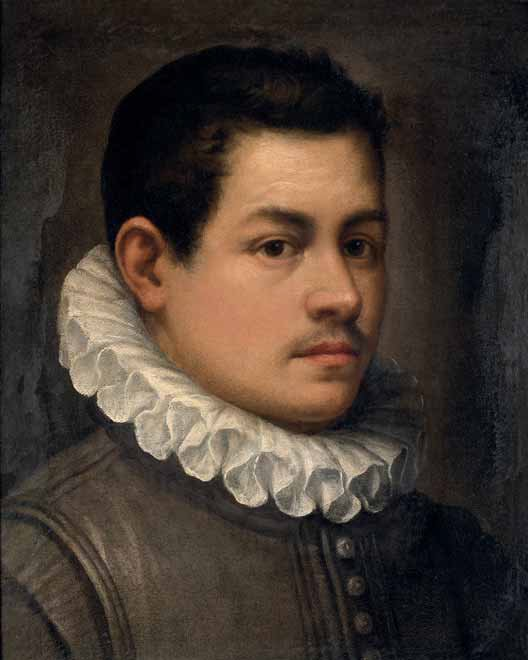
Annibale Carracci, c. 1580

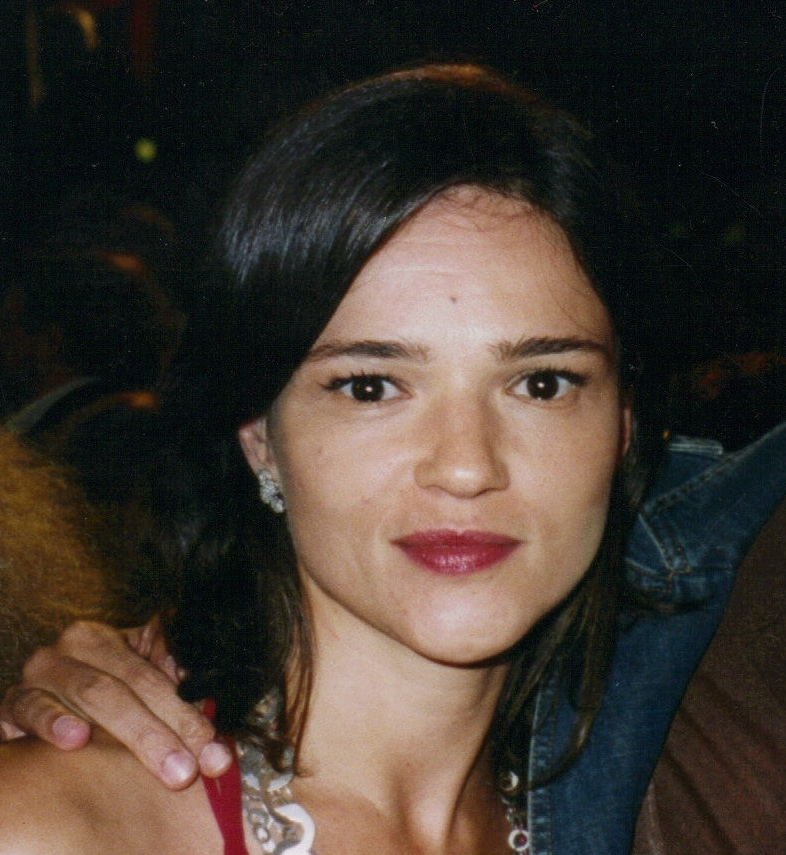
Chiara Caselli, 2002

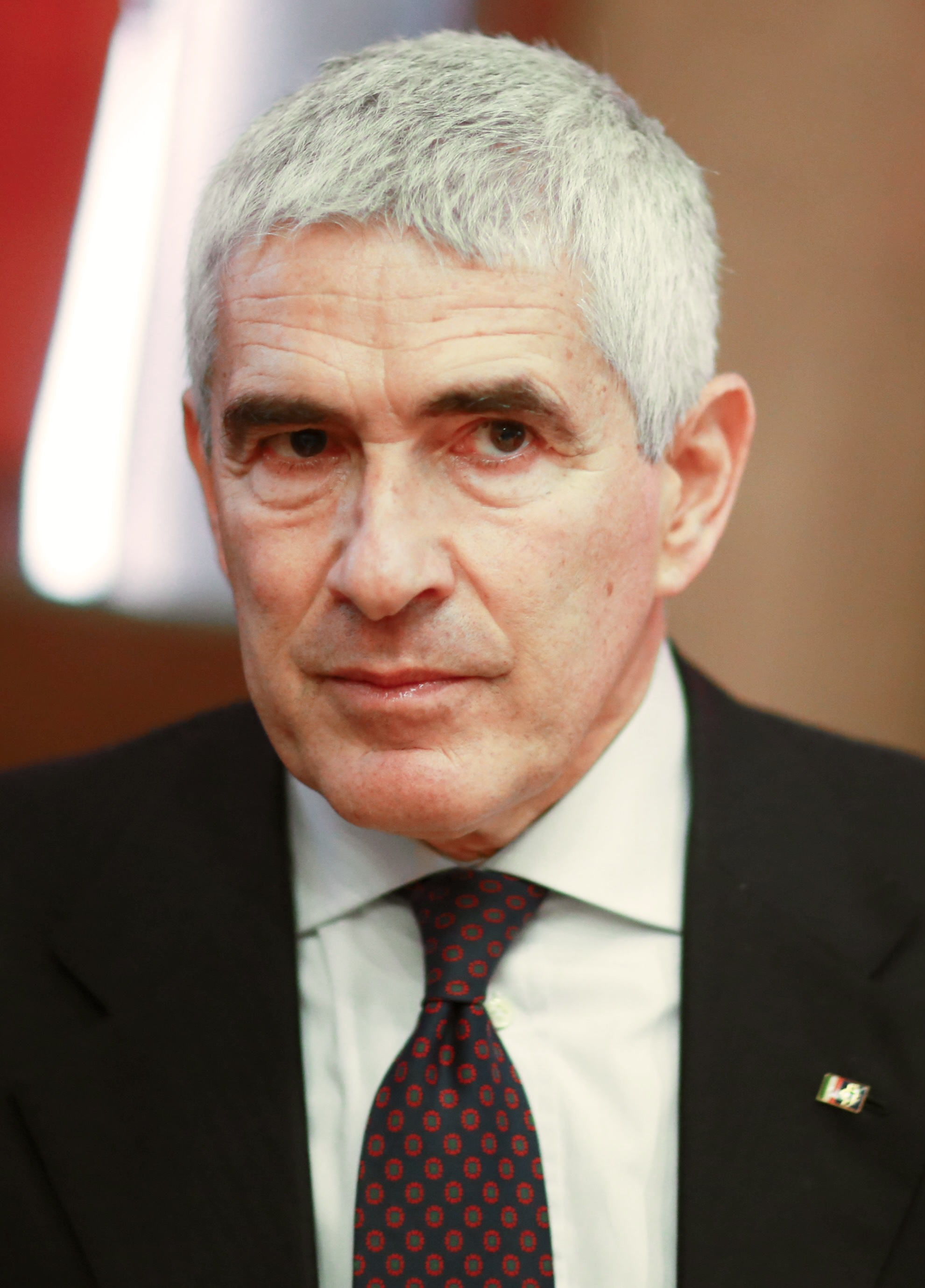
Pier Ferdinando Casini, 2016

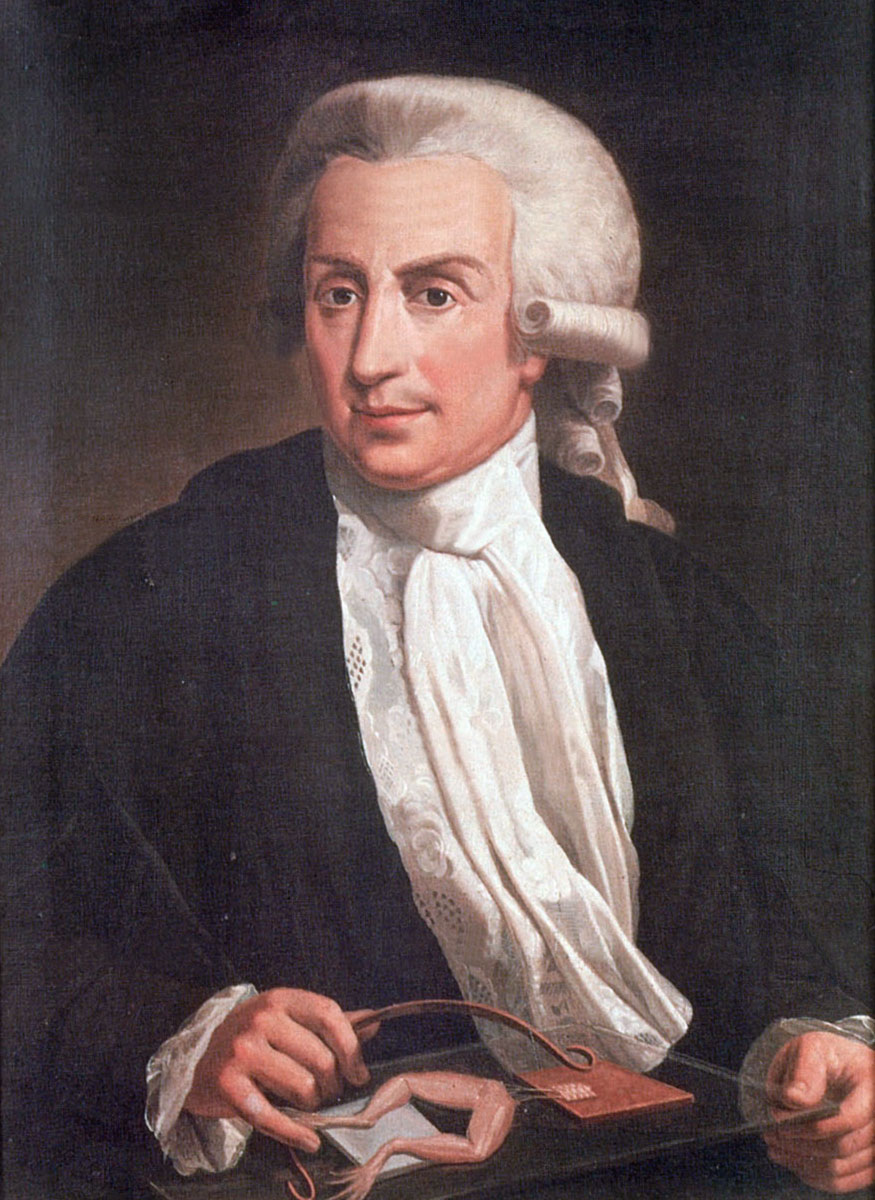
Luigi Galvani

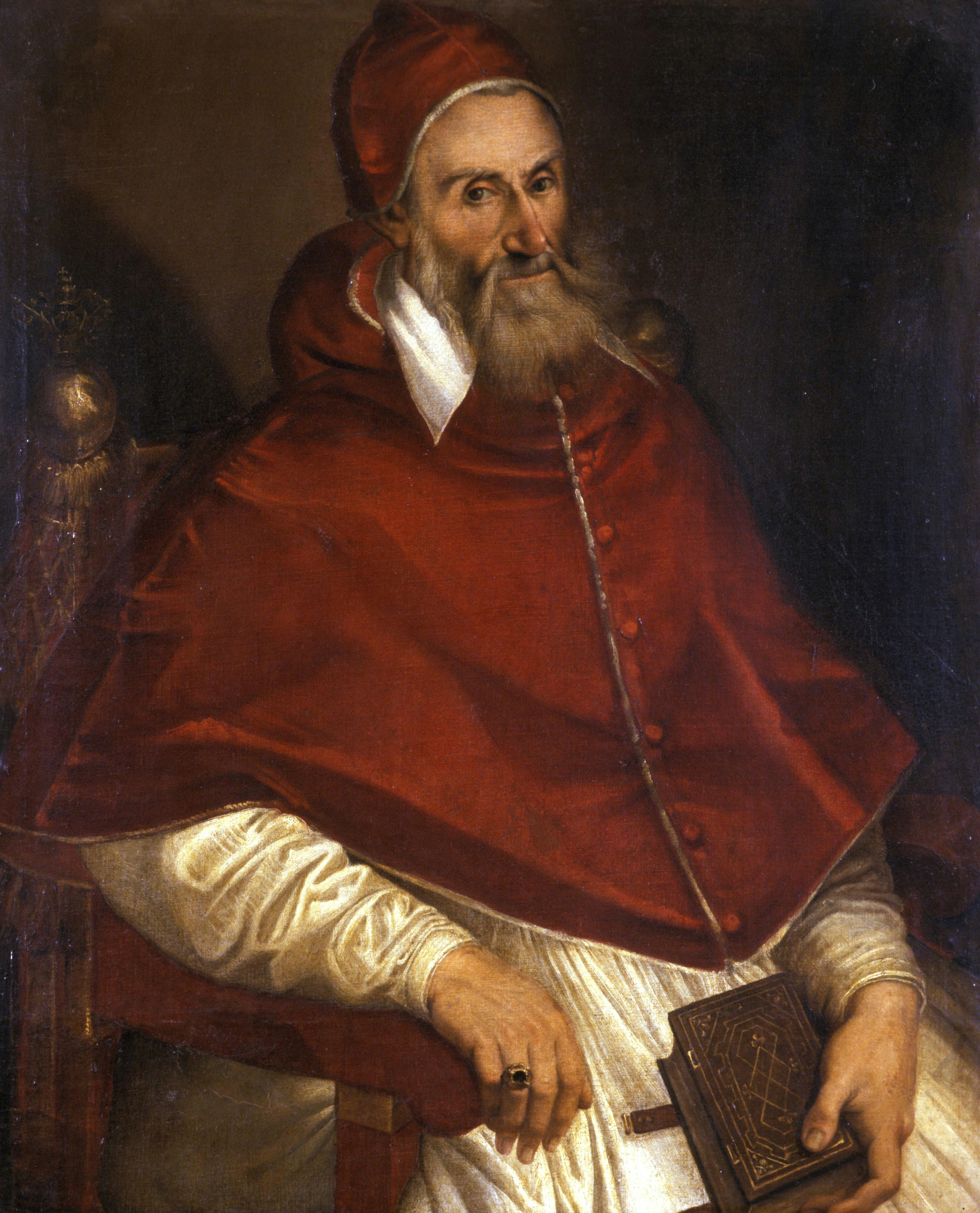
Pope Gregory XIII, 1586

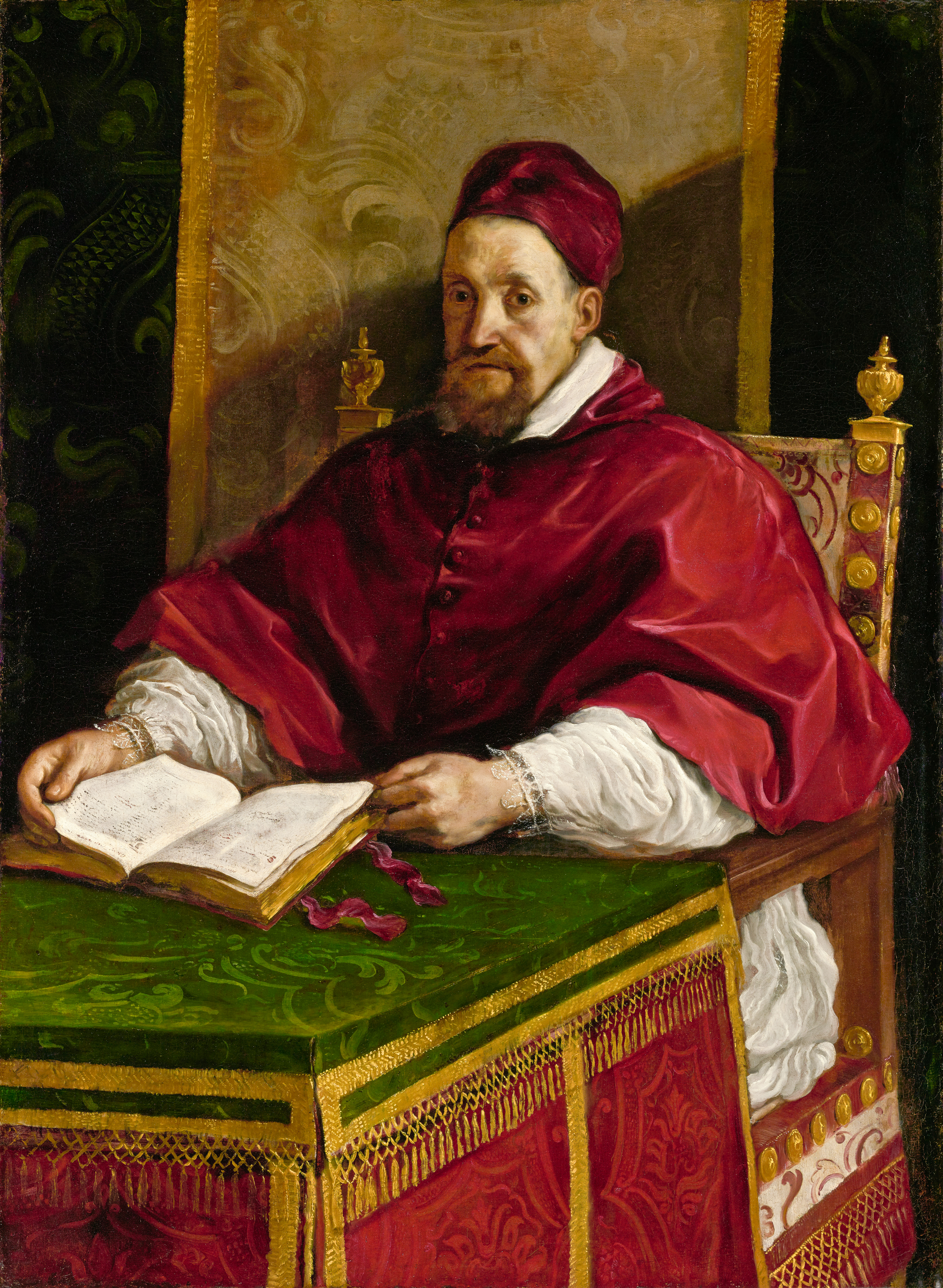
Pope Gregory XV, 1622

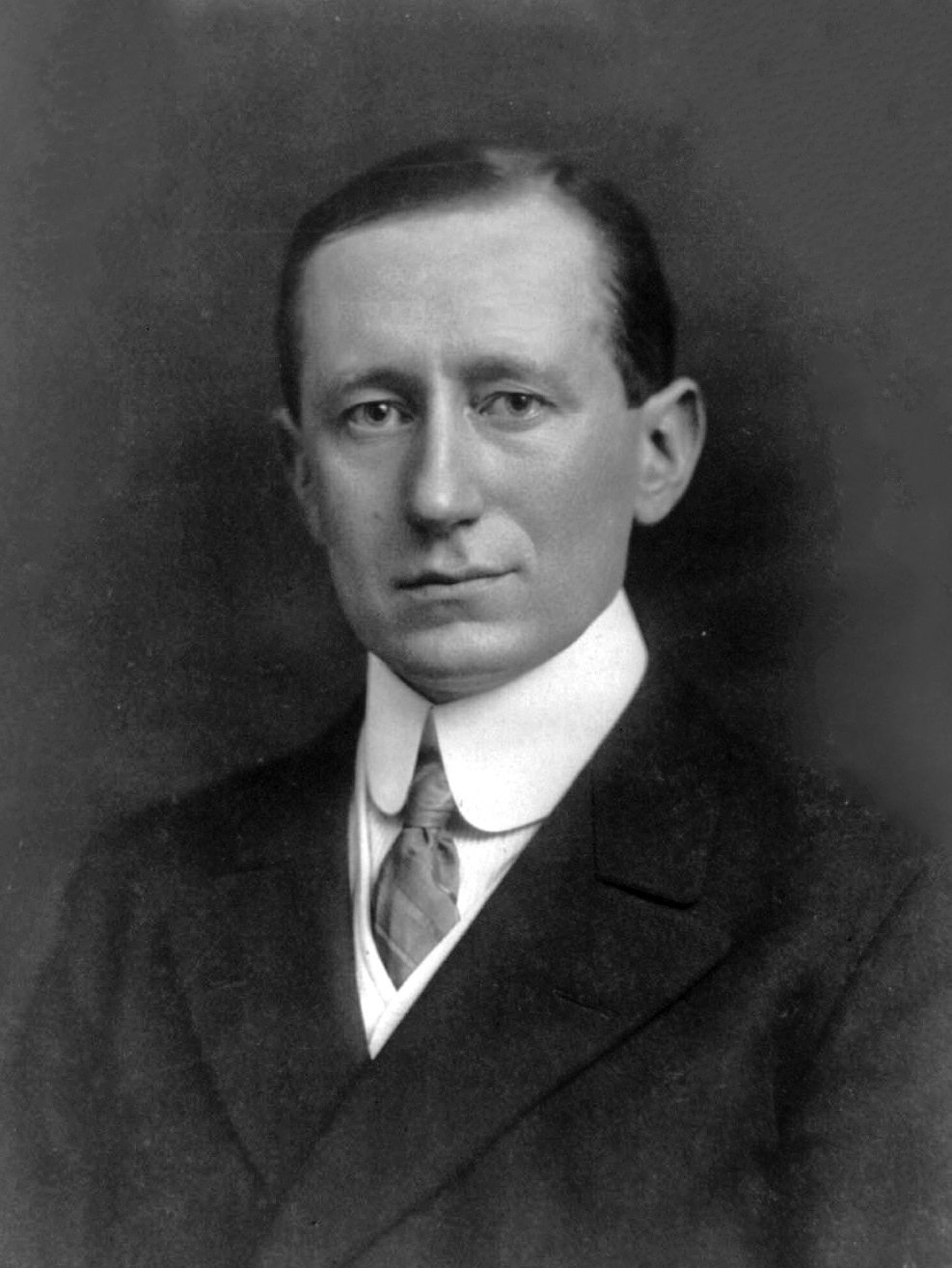
Guglielmo Marconi, 1908

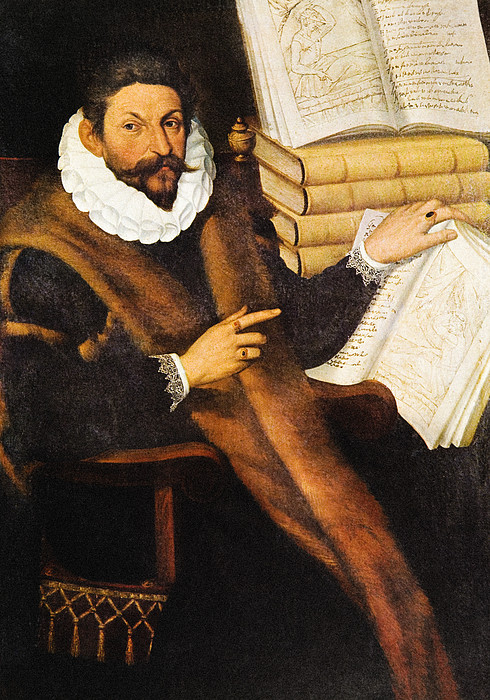
Gaspare Tagliacozzi

- Stefano Accorsi (born 1971), actor
- Maria Gaetana Agnesi (1718–1799), mathematician and humanitarian
- Kimi Antonelli (born 2006), Formula 1 driver for Mercedes and the 2026 champion
- Francesco Albani (1578–1660), Baroque painter
- Giovanni Aldini (1762–1834), physician and physicist
- Ulisse Aldrovandi (1522–1605), naturalist
- Antonio Alessandrini (1786–1861), anatomist and parasitologist
- Alessandro Algardi (1598–1654), a high-Baroque sculptor
- Victor Arimondi (1942–2001), photographer
- Giovanni Maria Artusi (c. 1540–1613), musical theorist, composer and writer
- Amico Aspertini (c. 1474–1552), painter
- Pupi Avati (born 1938), director
- Azo of Bologna (fl. 1150–1230), jurist and glossator
- Riccardo Bacchelli (1891–1985), writer
- Adriano Banchieri (1568–1634), composer
- Agostino Barelli (1627–1687), architect
- Massimiliano Bartoli, chef and restaurateur
- Antonio Basoli (1774–1848), painter and scene designer
- Laura Bassi (1711–1788), scientist, first female appointed to university chair in Europe
- Ugo Bassi (1800–1849), Italian nationalist hero, executed for role in 1848 uprisings
- Pier Francesco Battistelli (17th century), painter of quadratura
- Stefano Benni (1947–2025), writer
- Pope Benedict XIV (1675–1758) (Prospero Lorenzo Lambertini), pope 1740–58.
- Giovanni II Bentivoglio (1443–1508), nobleman. He ruled Bologna as a tyrant from 1463 until 1506.
- Amedeo Biavati (1915–1979), footballer, credited with the invention of the step over, World Champion 1938. He played only for Bologna FC
- Simone Bolelli (born 1985), professional tennis player
- Giacomo Bolognini (1664–1734), painter
- Rafael Bombelli (1526–1572), mathematician
- Rossano Brazzi (1916–1994), actor
- Bulgarus (died 1166), a twelfth-century jurist of Bulgarian origin
- Floriano Buroni (17th century), engraver
- Leopoldo Marco Antonio Caldani (1725–1813), anatomist and physiologist
- Arcangelo Canetoli (1460–1513), Roman Catholic priest, canon regular
- Alessandro Carloni (born 1978), director, animator and artist who worked on films such as Kung Fu Panda and The Croods
- Luca Carboni (born 1962), singer-songwriter
- Raffaella Carrà (1943–2021), singer
- Annibale Carracci (1560–1609), painter
- Lodovico Carracci (1555–1619), painter
- Agostino Carracci (1557–1602), painter
- Corrado Casalini (born 1914, date of death unknown), footballer
- Chiara Caselli (born 1967), actress
- Saint Catherine of Bologna (1413–1463), (Caterina de' Vigri), a poor Claire nun, writer, mystic and artist
- Pier Ferdinando Casini (born 1955), politician
- Pietro Cataldi (1548–1626), mathematician
- Chronics, rock band
- Pierluigi Collina (born 1960), football referee
- Carlo Colombara (born 1964), operatic bass
- Giovanni Paolo Colonna (1637–1695), composer, teacher, organist and organ builder
- Alessandro Cortini (born 1976), musician
- Cesare Cremonini (born 1980), singer-songwriter
- Giuseppe Maria Crespi (1665–1747), painter
- Donato Creti (1671–1749), painter
- Giulio Cesare Croce (1550–1609), cantastorie and writer
- Lucio Dalla (1943–2012), singer-songwriter
- Cristina D'Avena (born 1964), actress and singer
- Domenichino (1581–1641) (Domenico Zampieri), painter
- Elena Duglioli (1472–1520), Roman Catholic aristocrat
- Sara Errani (born 1987), tennis player
- Luigi Ferri (1826–1895), philosopher
- Scipione del Ferro (1465–1526), mathematician. He solved the cubic equation.
- Gianfranco Fini (born 1952), politician
- Aristotile Fioravanti (c. 1415 – c. 1486), architect
- Prospero Fontana (1512–1597), painter of late Renaissance and Mannerist art
- Carlo Fornasini (1854–1931), micropalaeontologist who studied Foraminifera
- Francesco Francia (c. 1450–1517) (Francesco Raibolini), painter
- Luigi Galvani (1737–1798), scientist, discoverer of bioelectricity
- Alessandro Gamberini (born 1981), footballer
- Alessandro Gavazzi (1809–1889), preacher, patriot and monk
- Serena Grandi (born 1958), actress
- Pope Gregory XIII (1502–1585) (Ugo Boncompagni), pope 1572–85. He instituted the Gregorian calendar.
- Pope Gregory XV (1554–1623) (Alessandro Ludovisi), pope 1621–3
- Il Guercino (1591–1666) (Giovanni Barbieri), painter
- Irnerius (c. 1050 – after 1125), jurist
- Blessed Imelda Lambertini (c. 1322–1333), Dominican novice, Eucharistic mystic and child saint
- Claudio Lolli (1950–2018), singer-songwriter
- Pope Lucius II (died 1145) (Gherardo Caccianemici dell'Orso), pope 1144–5
- Marcello Malpighi (1628–1694), physiologist, anatomist and histologist
- Guglielmo Marconi (1874–1937), engineer, pioneer of wireless telegraphy, Nobel prize for Physics
- Luigi Ferdinando Marsili (1658–1730), scholar and eminent natural scientist
- Giuseppe Marsigli (fl. 1677 – c. 1727), operatic tenor
- Giovanni Battista Martini (1706–1784), musical theorist
- Giuseppe Mezzofanti (1774–1839), cardinal, linguist and hyperpolyglot
- Marco Minghetti (1818–1886), economist and statesman
- Giorgio Morandi (1890–1964), painter
- Gianni Morandi (born 1944), singer
- Ludovico Morbioli (1433–1485), Catholic layman, declared Blessed
- Edgardo Mortara (1851–1940), Catholic priest that was the subject of the Mortara Case during the Risorgimento
- Nella Nobili (1926–1985), poet and writer
- Gianluca Pagliuca (born 1966), footballer
- Pier Paolo Pasolini (1922–1975), writer, poet and director
- James Primadicci (died–1460), Papal diplomat
- Agostino delle Prospettive (1525), painter
- Umberto Puppini (1884–1946), mathematician
- Roberto Regazzi (born 1956), luthier
- Guido Reni (1575–1642), painter
- Ottorino Respighi (1879–1936), composer
- Francesco Ricci Bitti (born 1942), Italian sports administrator
- Augusto Righi (1850–1920), physicist, authority on electromagnetism
- Carlo Ruini (1530–1598), equine anatomist
- Angelo Schiavio (1905–1990), footballer. He scored the winning goal in extra time in 1934 for Bologna FC.
- Senhit (born 1979), singer
- Elisabetta Sirani (1638–1665), painter
- Ruben Maria Soriquez (born 1971), film actor, director, producer
- Gaspare Tagliacozzi (1545–1599), surgeon, pioneer of plastic and reconstructive surgery
- Alberto Tomba (born 1966), skier
- Ondina Valla (1916–2006), first Italian woman Olympic gold medalist
- Mariele Ventre (1939–1995), teacher and educator, founder of Piccolo Coro dell' Antoniano choir
- Christian Vieri (born 1973), footballer
- Vitale da Bologna (fl. 1330, d. 1361), painter
- Anteo Zamboni (1911–1926), anarchist who at the age of 15 attempted to assassinate Benito Mussolini
- Alex Zanardi (born 1966), racing driver
- Marco Aurelio Zani de Ferranti (1801–1878), writer, musician and composer
- Matilda De Angelis (born 1995), actress and singer

The following made Bologna their home

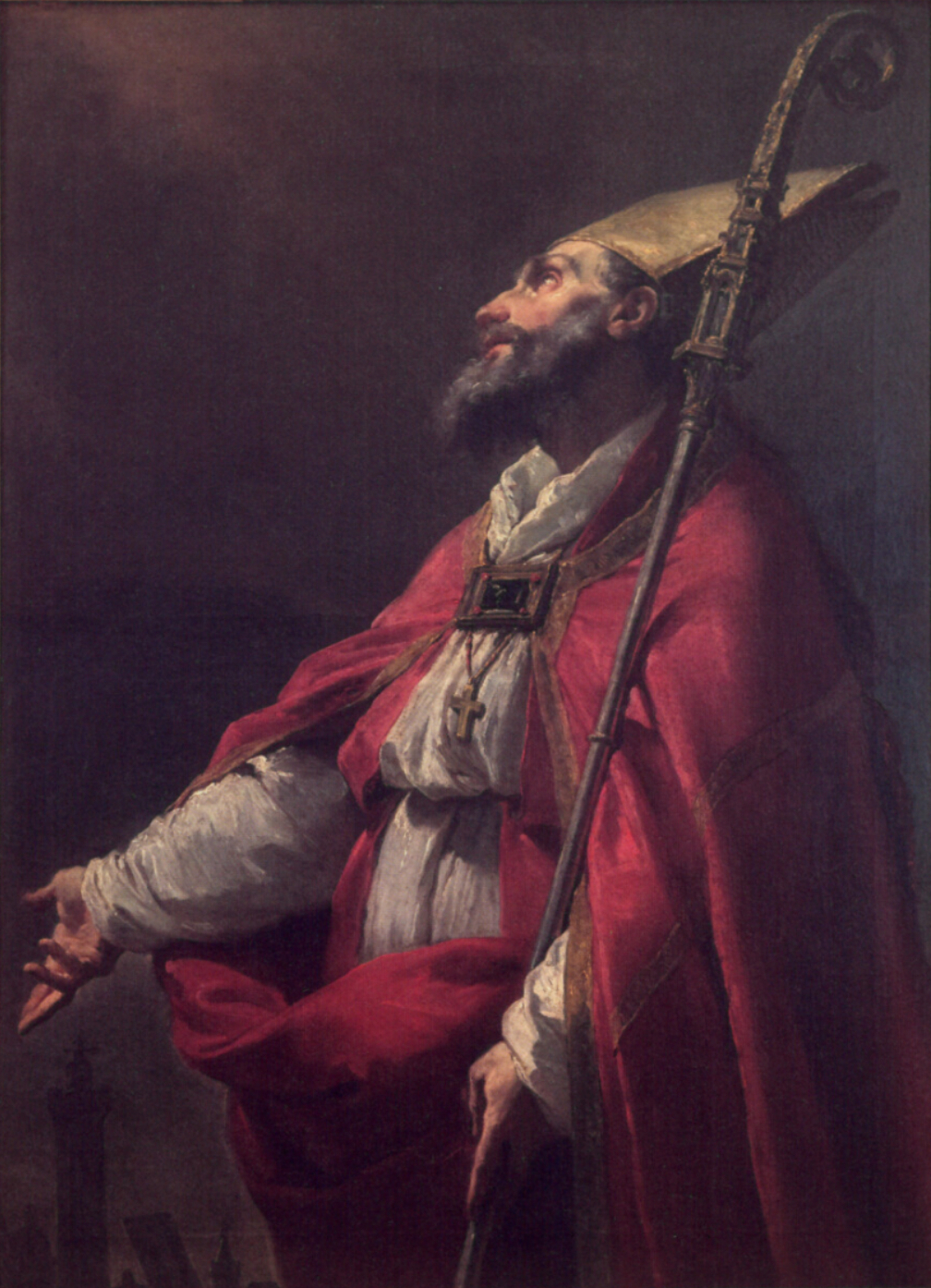
Petronius of Bologna

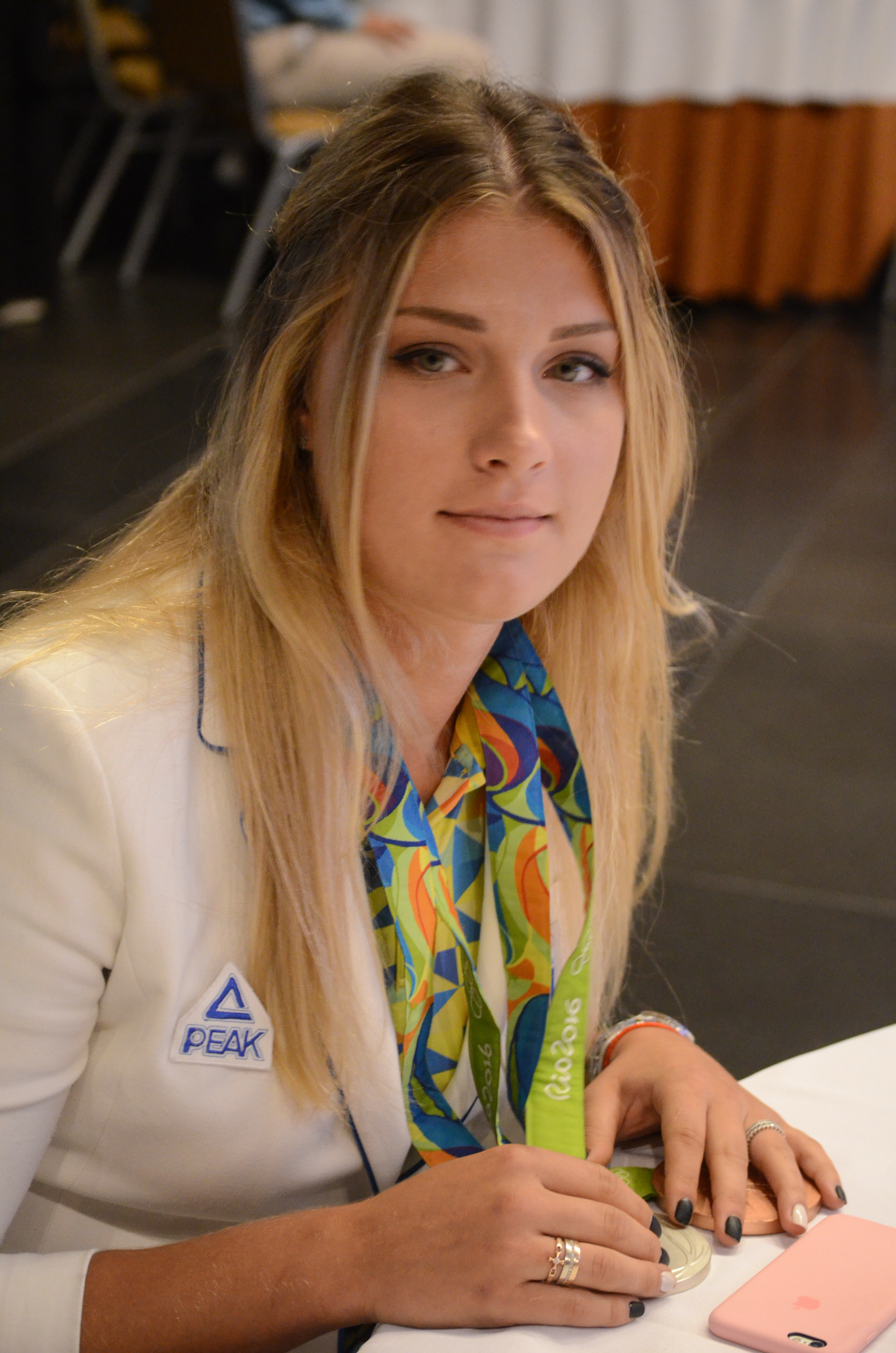
Olha Kharlan, 4-time women's world sabre world champion

- Giosuè Carducci (1835–1907), poet and academic, Nobel Prize for Literature, born near Lucca, Tuscany
- Carlo Felice Cillario (1915–2007), Italian conductor of international renown, founder of the Bologna Chamber Orchestra in 1946
- Niccolò dell'Arca (c. 1435/1440–1494), sculptor, born in Bari, Apulia
- Thomas Dempster (1579–1625), Scottish scholar and historian; born in Aberdeenshire, died in Bologna
- Umberto Eco (1932–2016), writer and academic, born in Alessandria, Piedmont
- Enzio of Sardinia (born c. 1218), King of Sardinia and illegitimate son of Emperor Frederick II. He was imprisoned in Palazzo Re Enzo from 1249 until his death in 1272.
- Vasco Errani (born 1955), politician
- Farinelli (Carlo Broschi, 1705–1782), castrato opera singer
- William Girometti (1924–1998), painter, born in Milan, Lombardy
- Olha Kharlan, Ukrainian 4-time women's world sabre world champion
- Alfonso Lombardi (c. 1497–1537), sculptor, born in Ferrara, Emilia-Romagna
- Wu Ming (formed in 2000), a collective of writers
- Juan Ignacio Molina (1740–1829), naturalist, born in Chile
- Odofredus (died 1265), jurist, born in Ostia and moved to Bologna in 1228
- Giovanni Pascoli (1855–1912), poet and academic, born in San Mauro Pascoli, Emilia-Romagna
- St. Petronius (San Petronio, birthplace unknown, died c. 450 AD), bishop of Bologna and patron saint of the city
- Romano Prodi (born 1939), economist and politician, born in Scandiano, Reggio Emilia
- Giorgio Rosa (1925–2017), engineer, president of short-lived micronation Republic of Rose Island
- Gioachino Rossini (1792–1868), opera composer, born in Pesaro, Marche
- Luigi Samele (born 1987), Olympic sabre fencer
- Giuseppe Torelli (1658–1709), composer, born in Verona, Veneto

== International relations ==
=== Twin towns – sister cities ===
Bologna is twinned with:

- Coventry, United Kingdom, since 1984
- Kharkiv, Ukraine, since 1966
- Leipzig, Germany, since 1962
- La Plata, Argentina, since 1988
- Portland, Oregon, United States, since 2003
- Prijepolje, Serbia, since 1966
- Saint-Louis, Senegal, since 1991
- St. Louis, United States, since 1987
- San Carlos, Nicaragua, since 1988
- Thessaloniki, Greece, since 1981
- Toulouse, France, since 1981
- Tuzla, Bosnia and Herzegovina, since 1994
- Valencia, Spain, since 1980
- Zagreb, Croatia, since 1961

== See also ==
- Bologna declaration
- Bologna metropolitan area
- Bologna Process
- Bolognese bell ringing
- List of tallest buildings in Bologna
- Opera Pia Dei Poveri Mendicanti
- San Girolamo dell'Arcoveggio
- Santa Maria Annunziata di Fossolo
