= Metropolitan areas of Italy =

The metropolitan areas of Italy are statistical areas denoting a region consisting of a densely populated urban core and its less-populated surrounding territories in Italy. Despite their sociodemographic importance, there is no legal recognition for these areas, which are defined statistically.

== Functional urban areas according to OECD ==
This is a list of FUAs in Italy with a population of at least 500.000 according to OECD (2024).

City	Population	Area (km^{2})	Density (inh./km^{2})	GDP 2021 (million USD, PPP)	GDP per capita 2021 (USD, PPP)
Milan	4.981.421	3.115	1.599	384.897	77.534
Rome	4.306.158	6.160	699	254.663	59.216
Naples	3.286.043	1.285	2.557	104.730	31.420
Turin	1.707.875	1.703	1.003	93.004	54.257
Palermo	980.315	1.492	657	31.034	31.362
Bologna	788.247	2.032	388	52.408	66.433
Florence	786.394	1.850	425	48.408	61.826
Bari	722.372	1.127	641	26.718	37.050
Genoa	681.255	1.195	570	38.099	56.002
Catania	640.313	610	1.049	19.436	30.754
Venice	545.623	661	825	26.224	47.544
Padua	535.963	614	873	30.488	57.131
Verona	515.380	732	704	28.832	55.961

== Functional urban areas according to Eurostat ==
This is a list of FUAs in Italy with a population of at least 500.000 according to Eurostat (2024).

City	Population
Milan	5.071.521
Rome	4.383.028
Naples	3.377.568
Turin	1.776.003
Palermo	993.319
Bologna	867.584
Catania	826.116
Florence	792.929
Genoa	685.380
Bari	684.089
Padua	562.386
Verona	559.770
Bergamo	548.697
Venice	545.496

== Metropolitan areas according to older studies ==
Data by OECD (2010)

City	Pop. World Rank	Population	Area (km^{2})	Density (inh./km^{2})	GDP 2010 (million USD)	GDP per capita 2010 (USD)
Bari	200	744,564	1,100.98	676.88	12,166.99	21,053.84
Bologna	195	778,849	2,036.19	376.00	28,942.43	38,835.60
Catania	229	656,610	609.35	1,028.40	11,189.23	17,943.80
Florence	190	807,673	1,737.87	486.12	24,888.82	34,416.56
Genoa	203	706,159	1,113.59	633.10	22,109.58	30,872.44
Milan	24	4,060,624	2,637.77	1,539.41	180,506.08	44,452.79
Naples	32	3,552,568	1,558.57	2,279.37	61,820.42	17,401.62
Palermo	145	1,035,921	835.58	1,120.08	18,492.21	19,758.31
Rome	26	4,008,095	5,686.46	704.84	142,053.82	35,441.73
Turin	72	1,747,614	1,781.34	981.06	54,538.34	31,207.31
Venice	259	541,969	1,089.17	497.59	17,097.93	31,547.79

Data by Global MetroMonitor (2012)

City	Population	GDP 2012 (million USD)	GDP per capita 2012 (USD)	Employment
Bologna	836,014	32.8	39,194	441,099
Florence	1,490,636	51.6	34,640	710,932
Genoa	911,726	30.1	33,003	381,883
Milan	7,626,467	289.3	37,938	3,588,796
Naples	4,460,993	83.6	18,749	1,286,022
Rome	4,328,236	167.8	38,765	2,086,794
Turin	2,338,339	76.6	32,775	1,071,747
Venice-Padua	1,642,986	57.9	35,252	769,887

Urban Outlook 2015 by CityRailways

City	Population January 1, 2014	Area (km^{2})	Density (inh./km^{2})
Milan	6,623,798	4,450.11	1,488
Naples	5,294,546	3,116.52	1,699
Rome	4,447,881	3,340.41	1,332
Turin	1,865,284	1,328.40	1,404
Venice-Padua	1,645,900	2,063.44	768
Florence	1,485,030	2,124.22	699
Bari	1,257,459	2,194.62	573
Palermo	1,183,084	1,237.26	956
Catania	988,240	771.32	1,281
Brescia	924,090	1,287.18	718
Genoa	861,318	721.81	1,193
Messina-Reggio Calabria	828,507	1,405.42	590
Rimini	748,352	927.20	807
Bologna	692,710	1,034.18	670
Modena	588,998	964.48	611
Verona	583,069	862.26	676
Pisa-Livorno	571,559	1,079.84	529
Pescara	529,070	979.88	540
Versilia	522,092	696.73	749
Vicenza	480,392	691.38	695
Cagliari	452,816	895.28	506
Taranto	439,730	1,000.65	439
Trieste	409,905	572.58	716
Ancona	408,358	854.48	478
Perugia	348,952	1,135.07	307
Lecce	345,476	768.65	449
Reggio nell'Emilia	307,817	658.75	467
Parma	305,826	682.46	448

== See also ==
- Metropolitan cities of Italy
- List of cities in Italy
- List of metropolitan areas in Europe
