= List of cities in Italy =

Map of Italy and some of its major cities

The following is a list of Italian municipalities with a population over 50,000. The table below contains the cities' populations between 1 January 2025 and 1 January 2026 (preliminary).

== List of cities ==
Cities marked with † are regional capitals.

Rank	City	Population		Change	Region
Rank	City	2025	2026	Change	Region
1	Rome (Roma) †	2,747,290	2,745,062	−0.08%	Lazio
2	Milan (Milano) †	1,365,698	1,362,863	−0.21%	Lombardy
3	Naples (Napoli) †	909,013	905,050	−0.44%	Campania
4	Turin (Torino) †	853,196	855,654	+0.29%	Piedmont
5	Palermo †	628,693	626,273	−0.38%	Sicily
6	Genoa (Genova) †	564,080	566,247	+0.38%	Liguria
7	Bologna †	390,151	391,473	+0.34%	Emilia-Romagna
8	Florence (Firenze) †	361,705	361,625	−0.02%	Tuscany
9	Bari †	315,831	316,248	+0.13%	Apulia
10	Catania	298,054	296,984	−0.36%	Sicily
11	Verona	255,039	255,139	+0.04%	Veneto
12	Venice (Venezia) †	249,490	249,385	−0.04%	Veneto
13	Messina	217,033	216,458	−0.26%	Sicily
14	Padua (Padova)	207,412	208,202	+0.38%	Veneto
15	Brescia	199,853	201,342	+0.75%	Lombardy
16	Parma	198,693	199,450	+0.38%	Emilia-Romagna
17	Trieste †	198,388	198,622	+0.12%	Friuli-Venezia Giulia
18	Prato	197,057	198,327	+0.64%	Tuscany
19	Taranto	186,011	185,112	−0.48%	Apulia
20	Modena	184,074	184,361	+0.16%	Emilia-Romagna
21	Reggio Emilia	172,284	172,921	+0.37%	Emilia-Romagna
22	Reggio Calabria	168,779	167,925	−0.51%	Calabria
23	Perugia †	162,050	162,384	+0.21%	Umbria
24	Ravenna	156,340	156,475	+0.09%	Emilia-Romagna
25	Livorno	153,154	152,451	−0.46%	Tuscany
26	Rimini	150,333	150,774	+0.29%	Emilia-Romagna
27	Cagliari †	146,692	145,981	−0.48%	Sardinia
28	Foggia	145,198	145,078	−0.08%	Apulia
29	Ferrara	129,081	129,048	−0.03%	Emilia-Romagna
30	Latina	127,796	127,450	−0.27%	Lazio
31	Salerno	126,000	125,323	−0.54%	Campania
32	Giugliano in Campania	125,032	125,018	−0.01%	Campania
33	Monza	123,032	123,672	+0.52%	Lombardy
34	Bergamo	120,389	120,629	+0.20%	Lombardy
35	Sassari	120,510	120,231	−0.23%	Sardinia
36	Trento †	118,640	119,359	+0.61%	Trentino-Alto Adige/Südtirol
37	Pescara	118,313	118,487	+0.15%	Abruzzo
38	Forlì	117,535	118,053	+0.44%	Emilia-Romagna
39	Syracuse (Siracusa)	115,776	115,515	−0.23%	Sicily
40	Vicenza	110,468	110,741	+0.25%	Veneto
41	Bolzano-Bozen	106,568	106,901	+0.31%	Trentino-Alto Adige/Südtirol
42	Terni	106,310	106,272	−0.04%	Umbria
43	Piacenza	103,406	103,737	+0.32%	Emilia-Romagna
44	Novara	102,231	103,238	+0.99%	Piedmont
45	Ancona †	99,533	100,151	+0.62%	Marche
46	Udine	98,279	98,501	+0.23%	Friuli-Venezia Giulia
47	Andria	96,750	96,520	−0.24%	Apulia
48	Arezzo	96,479	96,506	+0.03%	Tuscany
49	Cesena	95,730	95,620	−0.11%	Emilia-Romagna
50	Pesaro	95,266	95,270	0.00%	Marche
51	Lecce	94,187	94,387	+0.21%	Apulia
52	Alessandria	92,522	93,409	+0.96%	Piedmont
53	La Spezia	92,706	92,610	−0.10%	Liguria
54	Barletta	92,191	92,067	−0.13%	Apulia
55	Pisa	89,422	90,146	+0.81%	Tuscany
56	Guidonia Montecelio	89,011	89,420	+0.46%	Lazio
57	Pistoia	88,889	89,094	+0.23%	Tuscany
58	Lucca	89,002	88,464	−0.60%	Tuscany
59	Treviso	85,652	86,113	+0.54%	Veneto
60	Busto Arsizio	84,005	84,595	+0.70%	Lombardy
61	Fiumicino	82,829	83,415	+0.71%	Lazio
62	Como	83,135	83,035	−0.12%	Lombardy
63	Catanzaro †	83,313	82,708	−0.73%	Calabria
64	Grosseto	81,264	81,275	+0.01%	Tuscany
65	Brindisi	81,723	81,181	−0.66%	Apulia
66	Marsala	79,571	79,521	−0.06%	Sicily
67	Varese	78,992	79,100	+0.14%	Lombardy
68	Sesto San Giovanni	78,792	78,850	+0.07%	Lombardy
69	Torre del Greco	79,397	78,839	−0.70%	Campania
70	Cinisello Balsamo	74,702	75,154	+0.61%	Lombardy
71	Aprilia	74,586	74,697	+0.15%	Lazio
72	Pozzuoli	75,375	74,665	−0.94%	Campania
73	Corigliano-Rossano	74,332	74,403	+0.10%	Calabria
74	Ragusa	73,878	74,122	+0.33%	Sicily
75	Carpi	73,297	74,041	+1.02%	Emilia-Romagna
76	Asti	73,440	73,604	+0.22%	Piedmont
77	Casoria	73,724	73,257	−0.63%	Campania
78	Caserta	72,793	72,757	−0.05%	Campania
79	Pavia	71,610	71,811	+0.28%	Lombardy
80	Cremona	70,922	71,093	+0.24%	Lombardy
81	L’Aquila †	70,425	70,803	+0.54%	Abruzzo
82	Altamura	70,163	70,336	+0.25%	Apulia
83	Gela	70,451	70,109	−0.49%	Sicily
84	Imola	69,403	69,702	+0.43%	Emilia-Romagna
85	Quartu Sant'Elena	68,237	67,869	−0.54%	Sardinia
86	Lamezia Terme	67,269	67,005	−0.39%	Calabria
87	Viterbo	66,393	66,767	+0.56%	Lazio
88	Vittoria	65,873	66,329	+0.69%	Sicily
89	Massa	65,814	65,547	−0.41%	Tuscany
90	Pomezia	64,665	64,970	+0.47%	Lazio
91	Vigevano	62,771	63,480	+1.13%	Lombardy
92	Cosenza	63,240	63,449	+0.33%	Calabria
93	Potenza †	63,864	63,403	−0.72%	Basilicata
94	Castellammare di Stabia	62,320	61,937	−0.61%	Campania
95	Olbia	61,681	61,739	+0.09%	Sardinia
96	Afragola	61,786	61,581	−0.33%	Campania
97	Legnano	60,679	60,980	+0.50%	Lombardy
98	Viareggio	60,618	60,680	+0.10%	Tuscany
99	Anzio	59,789	60,063	+0.46%	Lazio
100	Fano	59,903	59,871	−0.05%	Marche
101	Carrara	59,662	59,723	+0.10%	Tuscany
102	Matera	59,628	59,368	−0.44%	Basilicata
103	Faenza	58,732	58,750	+0.03%	Emilia-Romagna
104	Acerra	58,676	58,585	−0.16%	Campania
105	Savona	58,581	58,421	−0.27%	Liguria
106	Crotone	58,372	58,136	−0.40%	Calabria
107	Caltanissetta	58,182	57,922	−0.45%	Sicily
108	Marano di Napoli	57,619	57,631	+0.02%	Campania
109	Molfetta	57,229	57,016	−0.37%	Apulia
110	Cerignola	56,900	56,711	−0.33%	Apulia
111	Cuneo	55,751	55,747	−0.01%	Piedmont
112	Moncalieri	55,439	55,442	+0.01%	Piedmont
113	Benevento	55,712	55,330	−0.69%	Campania
114	Tivoli	55,115	55,321	+0.37%	Lazio
115	Foligno	55,303	55,262	−0.07%	Umbria
116	Agrigento	55,252	55,118	−0.24%	Sicily
117	Trani	54,803	54,731	−0.13%	Apulia
118	Trapani	54,949	54,636	−0.57%	Sicily
119	Modica	53,483	53,622	+0.26%	Sicily
120	Montesilvano	53,602	53,557	−0.08%	Abruzzo
121	Bisceglie	53,404	53,242	−0.30%	Apulia
122	Siena	52,990	53,180	+0.36%	Tuscany
123	Sanremo	53,059	53,157	+0.18%	Liguria
124	Bagheria	53,100	53,152	+0.10%	Sicily
125	Velletri	52,877	53,048	+0.32%	Lazio
126	Gallarate	52,902	53,023	+0.23%	Lombardy
127	Manfredonia	53,391	53,015	−0.70%	Apulia
128	Bitonto	52,958	52,868	−0.17%	Apulia
129	Pordenone	52,314	52,744	+0.82%	Friuli-Venezia Giulia
130	Avellino	51,975	51,819	−0.30%	Campania
131	Teramo	51,600	51,400	−0.39%	Abruzzo
132	Ardea	50,908	51,374	+0.92%	Lazio
133	Civitavecchia	51,582	51,359	−0.43%	Lazio
134	Portici	51,429	51,213	−0.42%	Campania
135	Rho	50,879	51,000	+0.24%	Lombardy
136	Acireale	50,611	50,528	−0.16%	Sicily
137	Mantua	49,607	50,215	+1.23%	Lombardy
138	Mazara del Vallo	50,011	50,070	+0.12%	Sicily

== Gallery ==
Ten largest cities in Italy
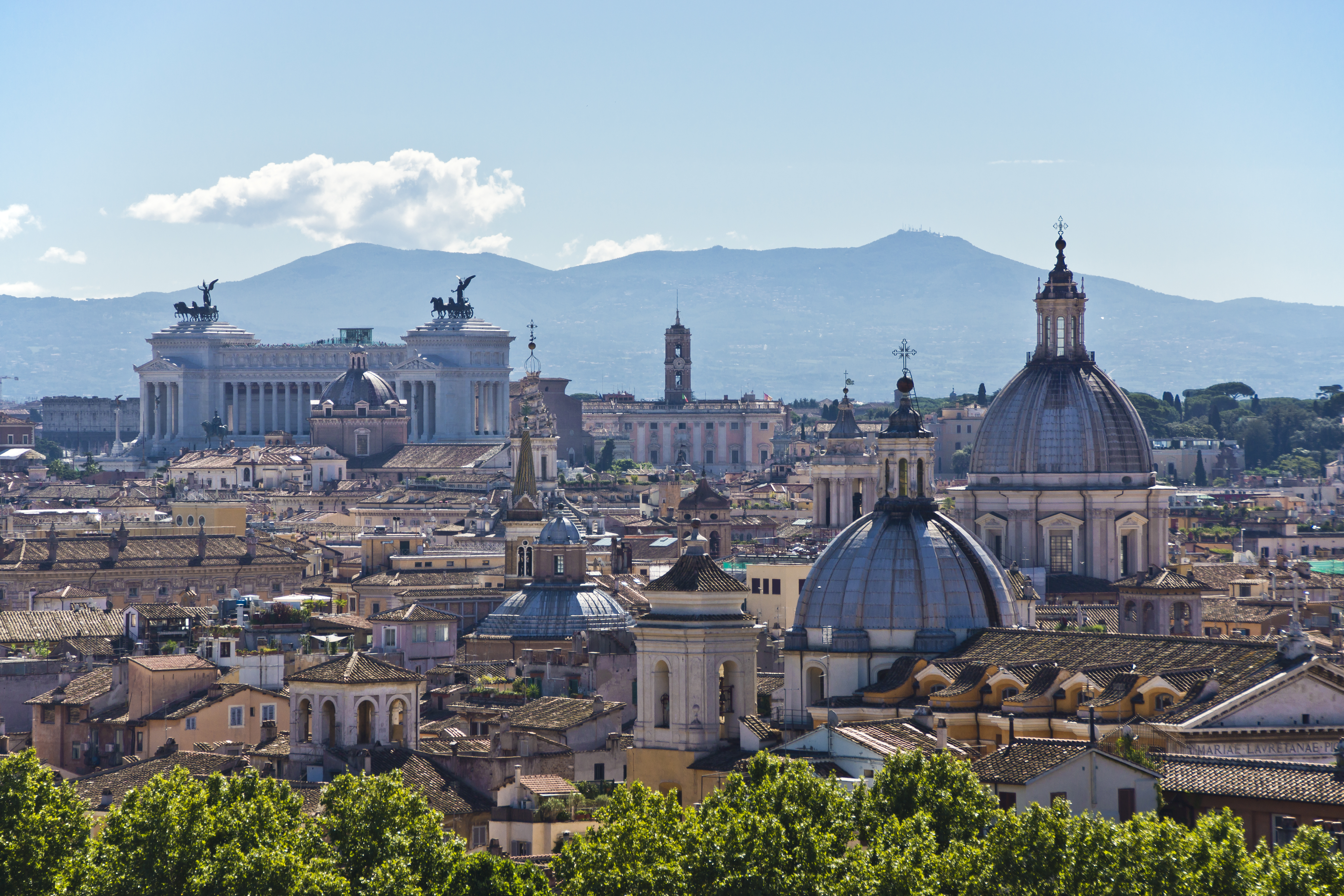
1. Rome

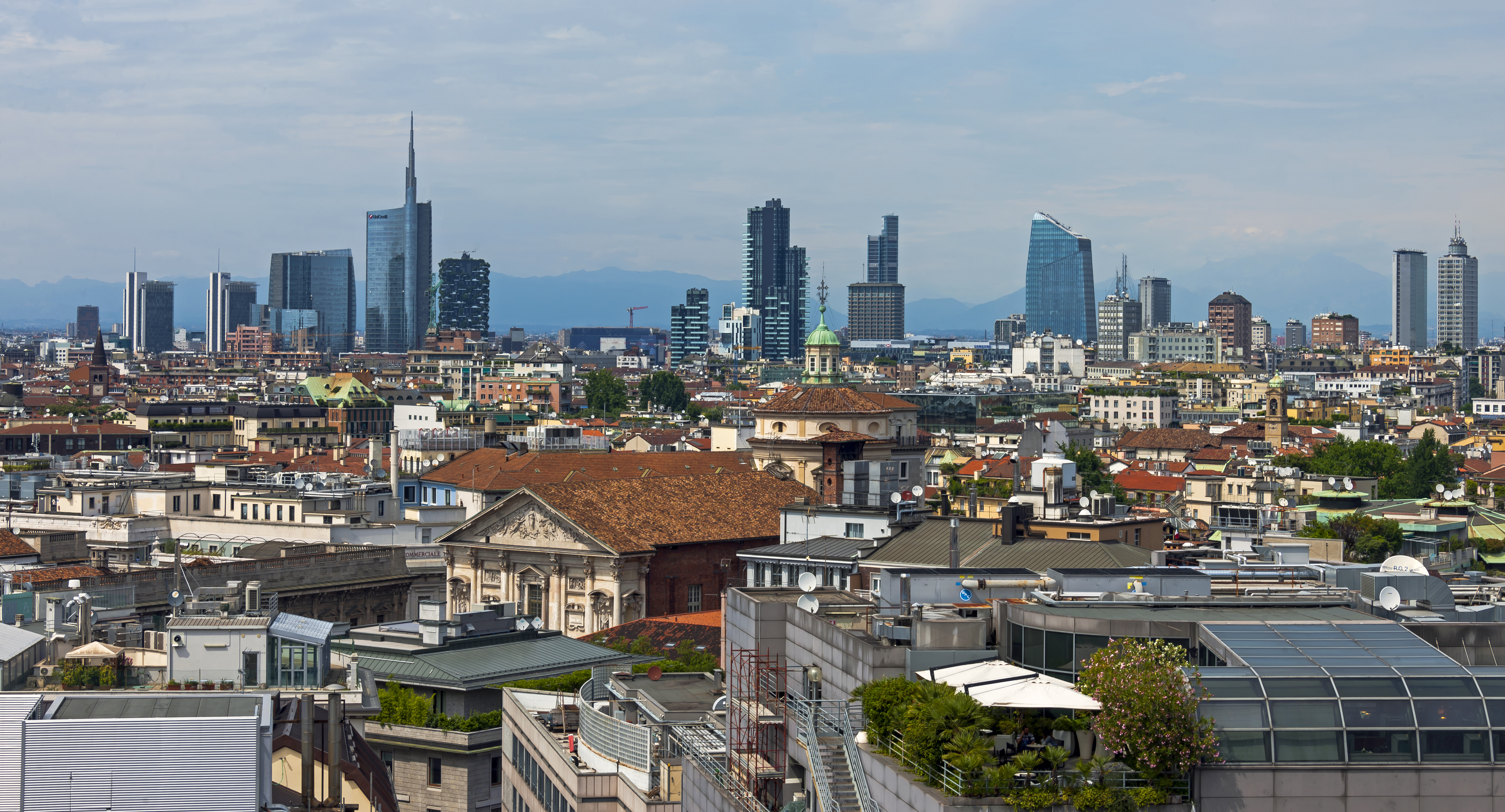
2. Milan

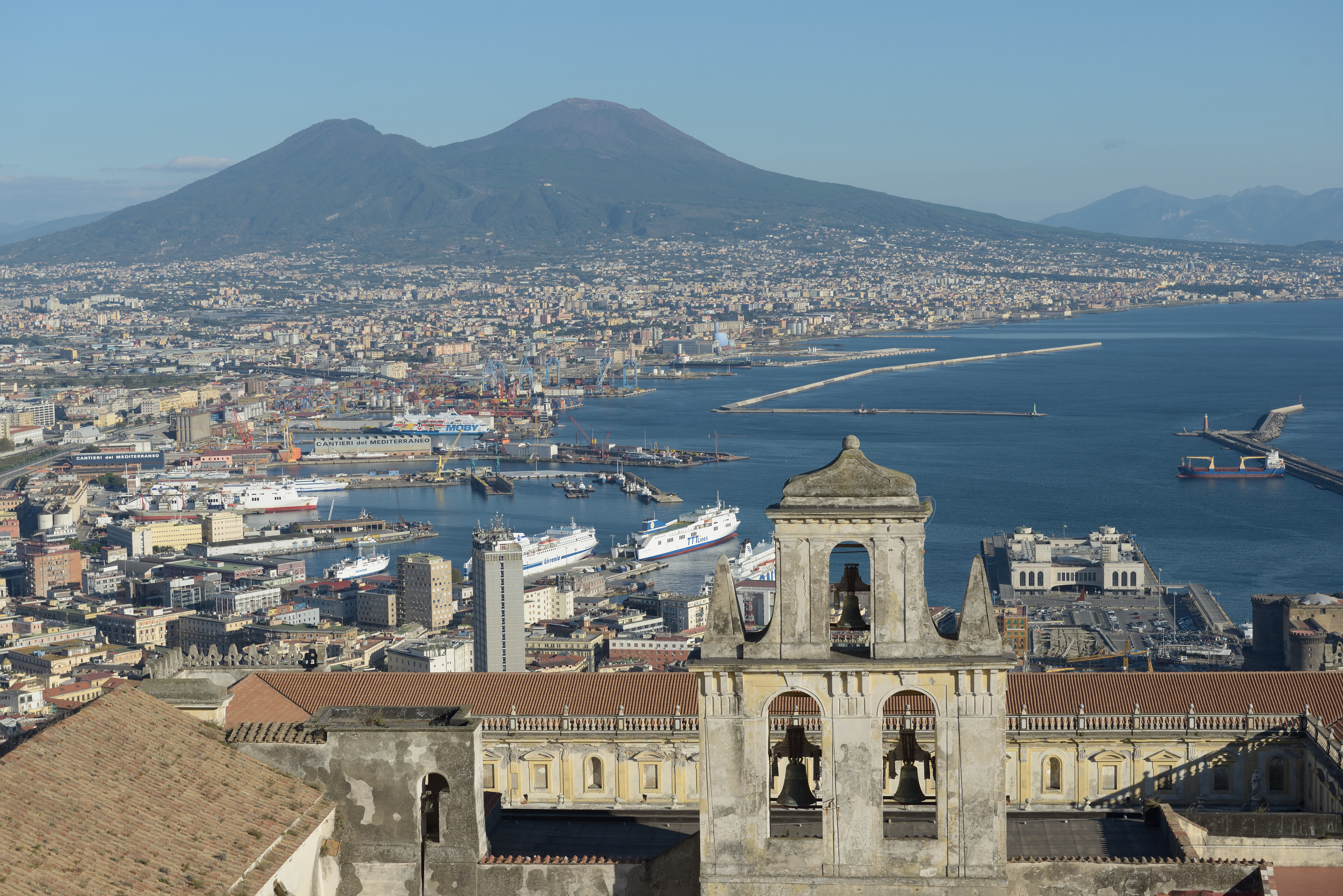
3. Naples

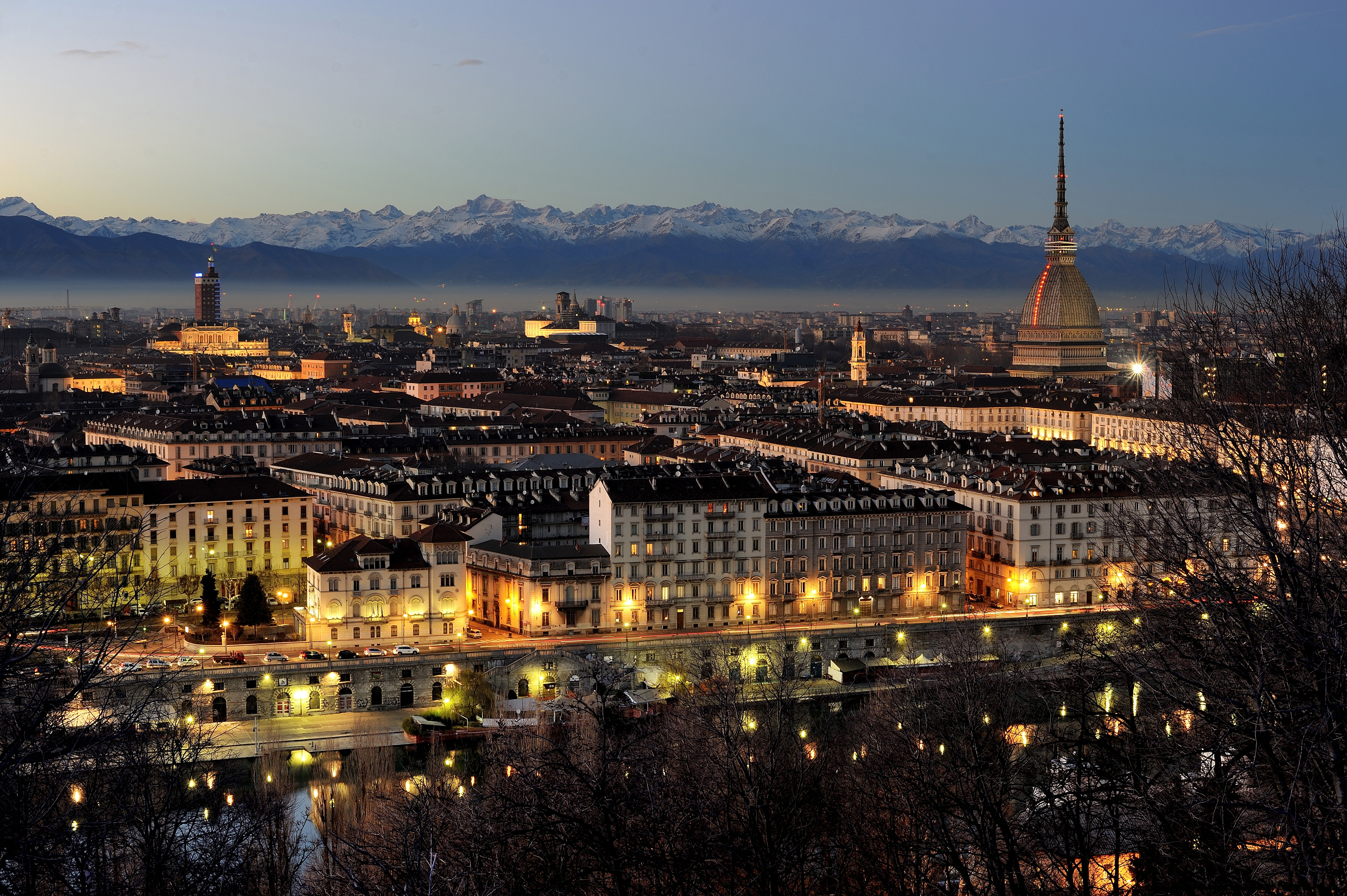
4. Turin

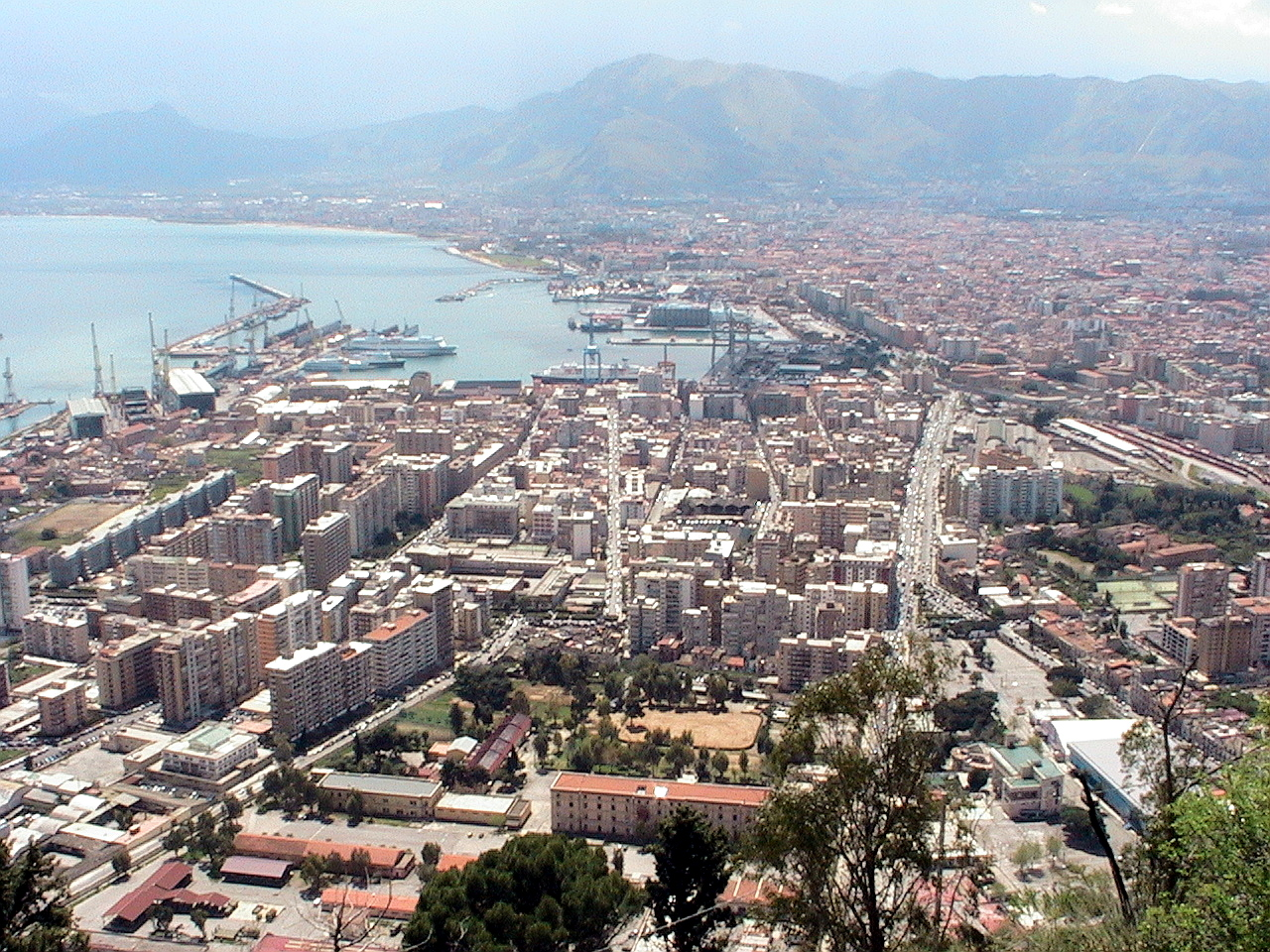
5. Palermo

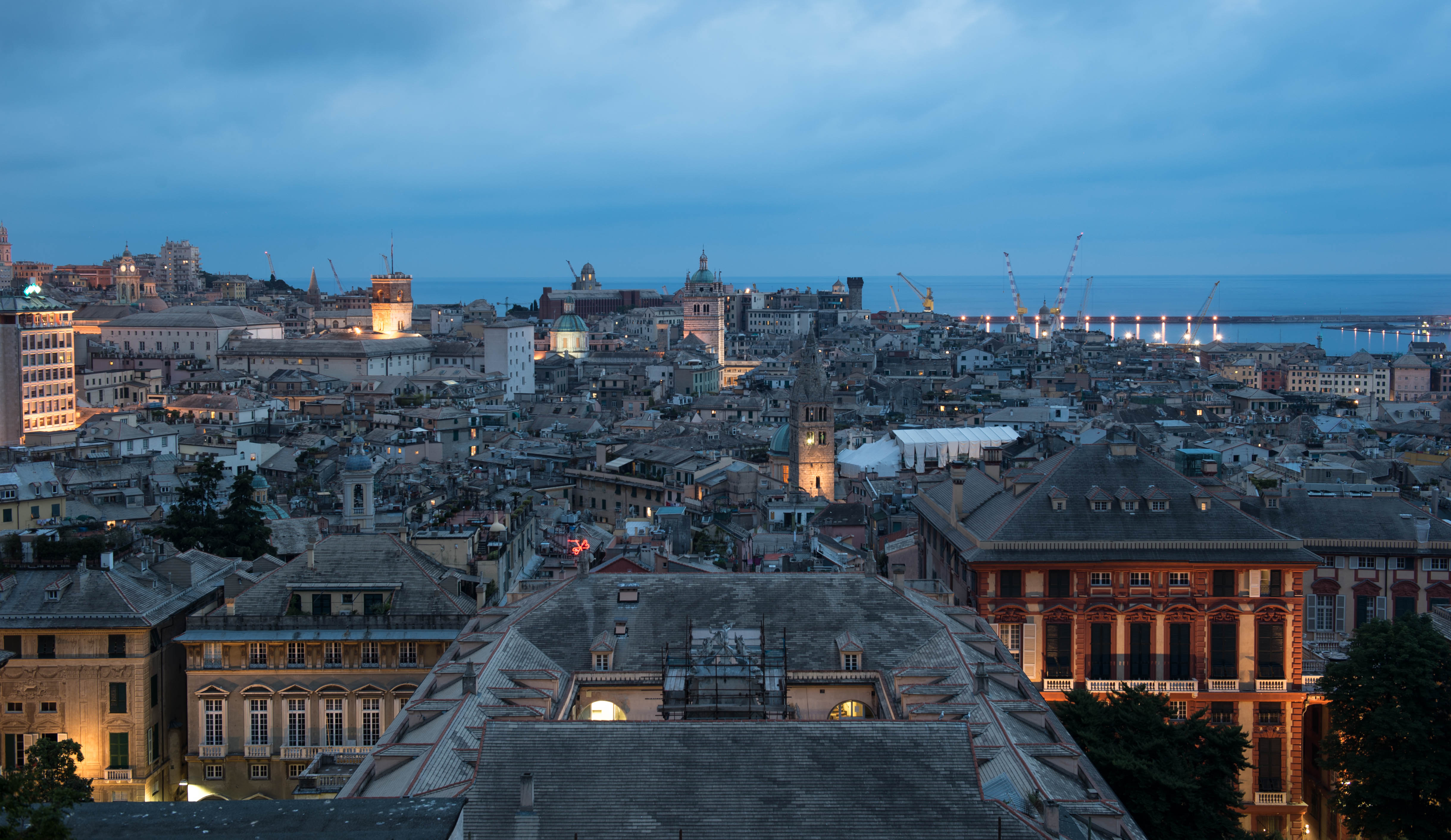
6. Genoa

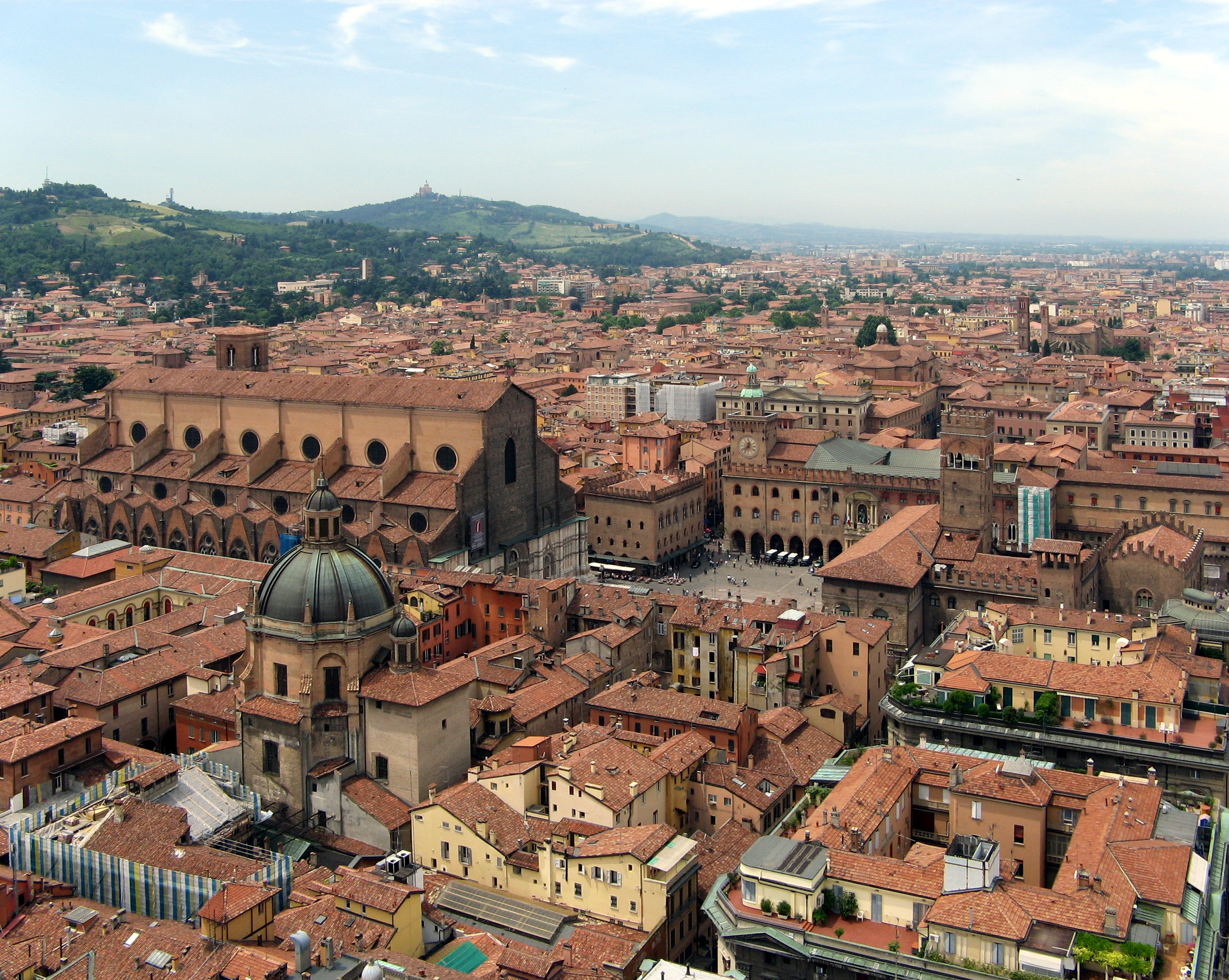
7. Bologna

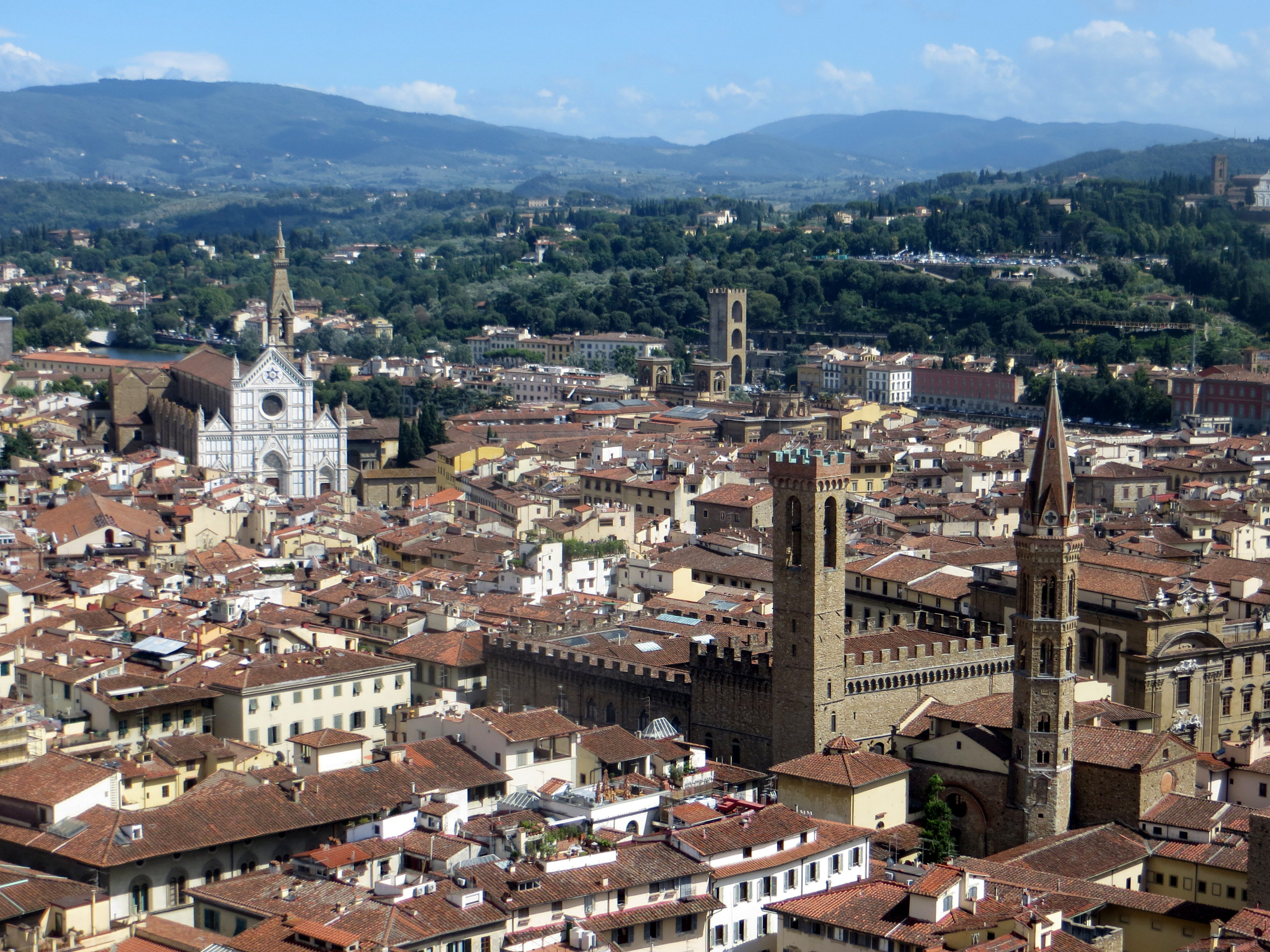
8. Florence

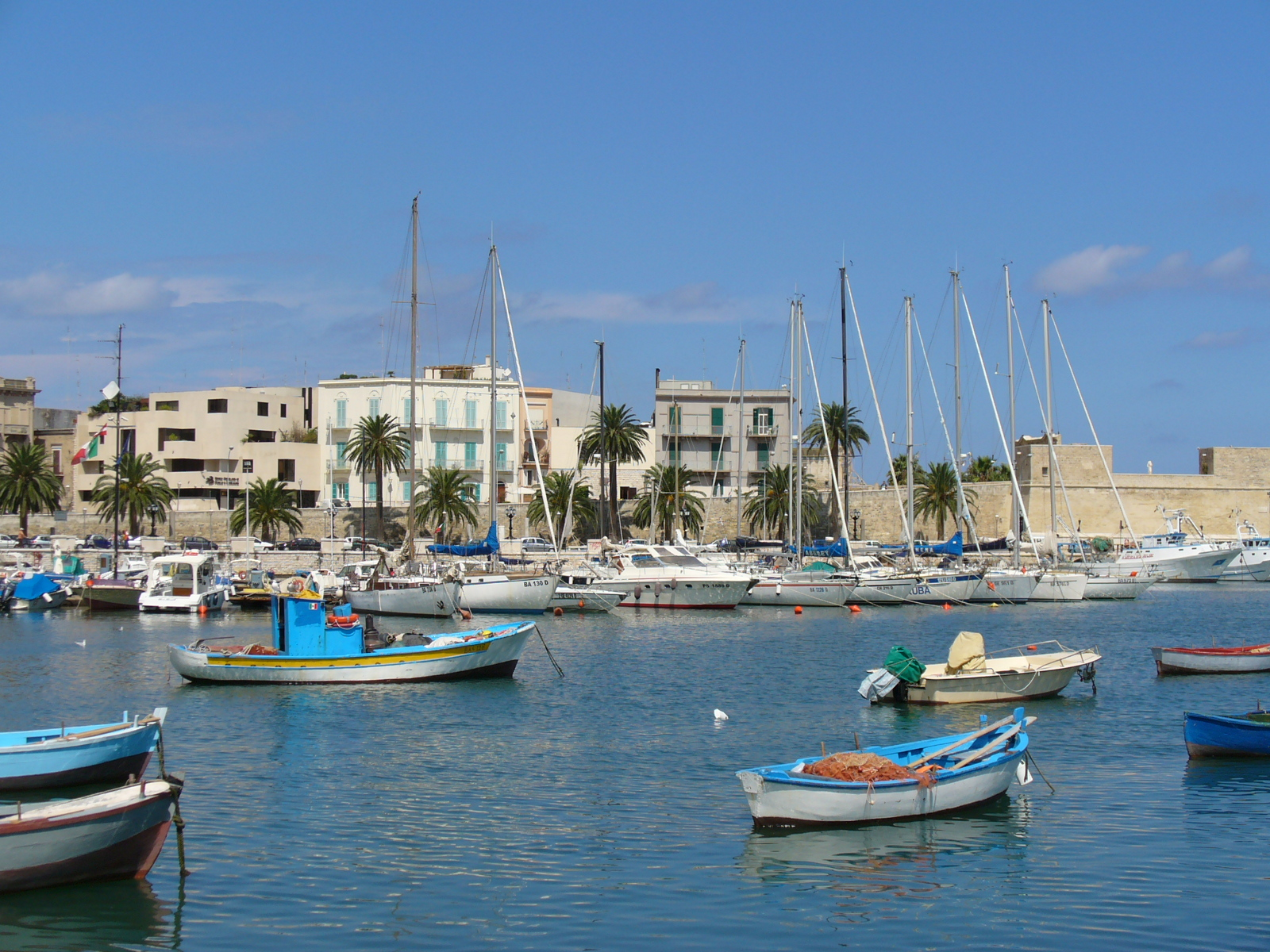
9. Bari

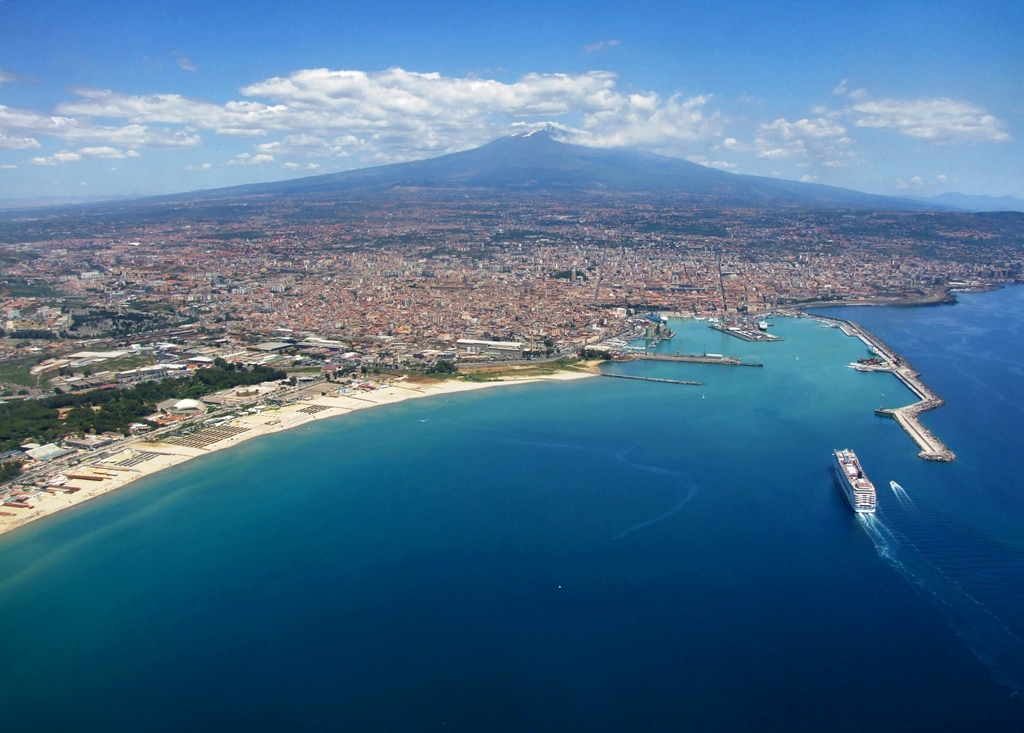
10. Catania

== See also ==
- Metropolitan cities of Italy
- Metropolitan areas of Italy
