= List of coastal settlements of the Mediterranean Sea =

== Metropolitan areas ==
Metropolitan areas with a population of 1,000,000 or higher on the Mediterranean, sorted by their population according to national sources. They can be reordered by name (alphabetically), country, or their population according to the Organisation for Economic Co-operation and Development (OECD), the United Nations Population Division or Citypopulation.de.

Metropolitan area	Country	National source	OECD (2020)	United Nations (2020)	Citypopulation.de (2025)	Area
Alexandria	Egypt	5,481,679	7,165,715	5,281,000	6,250,000	293 km^{2} (113 sq mi)
Barcelona	Spain	5,270,609	5,345,763	5,586,000	4,875,000	1,072 km^{2} (414 sq mi)
Algiers	Algeria	4,381,238	5,009,842	2,768,000	4,325,000	443 km^{2} (171 sq mi)
Tel Aviv	Israel	4,293,000	3,174,057	4,181,000	3,000,000	578 km^{2} (223 sq mi)
Rome	Italy	4,223,885	3,684,930	4,257,000	3,425,000	1,145 km^{2} (442 sq mi)
Athens	Greece	3,638,281	3,618,860	3,153,000	3,575,000	583 km^{2} (225 sq mi)
İzmir	Turkey	3,025,000	2,870,159	2,993,000	4,493,000	300 km^{2} (120 sq mi)
Naples	Italy	2,958,410	4,095,364	2,187,000	4,050,000	466 km^{2} (180 sq mi)
Tunis	Tunisia	2,906,900	2,872,207	2,365,000	2,725,000	451 km^{2} (174 sq mi)
Gaza	Palestine	2,257,051	1,772,136	714,000	2,275,000	228 km^{2} (88 sq mi)
Beirut	Lebanon	2,244,800	2,165,018	2,424,000	1,930,000	528 km^{2} (204 sq mi)
Marseille	France	1,888,788	1,322,989	1,608,000	1,710,000	689 km^{2} (266 sq mi)
Valencia	Spain	1,609,843	1,916,932	834,000	1,940,000	394 km^{2} (152 sq mi)
Tripoli	Libya	1,519,000	1,555,446	1,165,000	1,870,000	502 km^{2} (194 sq mi)
Antalya	Turkey	1,508,134	1,385,471	1,254,000	1,400,000	181 km^{2} (70 sq mi)
Oran	Algeria	1,454,078	1,330,620	899,000	1,640,000	153 km^{2} (59 sq mi)
Tangier	Morocco	1,275,428	1,232,254	1,198,000	1,410,000	96 km^{2} (37 sq mi)
Bari	Italy	1,218,191	608,350	622,000	Not listed	117 km^{2} (45 sq mi)
Palermo	Italy	1,194,439	955,720	851,000	Not listed	176 km^{2} (68 sq mi)
Mersin	Turkey	1,084,789	930,220	1,016,000	1,060,000	205 km^{2} (79 sq mi)
Catania	Italy	1,068,563	765,469	586,000	Not listed	269 km^{2} (104 sq mi)
Málaga	Spain	1,033,125	1,048,764	590,000	1,100,000	135 km^{2} (52 sq mi)
Haifa	Israel	1,030,000	831,987	1,147,000	Not listed	150 km^{2} (58 sq mi)
Nice	France	1,019,905	1,143,557	942,000	Not listed	466 km^{2} (180 sq mi)
Thessaloniki	Greece	1,006,112	1,011,795	812,000	Not listed	225 km^{2} (87 sq mi)

== Cities ==
Cities are ordered by their position on the Mediterranean Sea, following the coastline clockwise from the Strait of Gibraltar; settlements on islands are listed after the settlemtns on their country's mainland. They can be reordered by name (alphabetically), country, subdivision of the Mediterranean or population.

City	Country	Subdivision (smaller seas)	Population	OECD (2020)
Algeciras	Spain	Strait of Gibraltar	?	237,819
Gibraltar	Gibraltar	Strait of Gibraltar	32,000	Not listed
Marbella	Spain	Alboran Sea	?	239,929
Málaga	Spain	Alboran Sea	?	1,048,764
Almería	Spain	Alboran Sea	?	239,929
Cartagena	Spain	None	?	221,905
Torrevieja	Spain	None	?	239,019
Alicante	Spain	None	?	554,887
Benidorm	Spain	None	?	171,848
Gandia	Spain	Balearic Sea	?	140,312
Valencia	Spain	Balearic Sea	?	1,916,932
Castellón de la Plana	Spain	Balearic Sea	?	376,115
Tarragona	Spain	Balearic Sea	?	410,236
Vilanova i la Geltrú	Spain	Balearic Sea	?	180,303
Castelldefels	Spain	Balearic Sea	69,450	?
Barcelona	Spain	Balearic Sea	?	5,345,763
Badalona	Spain	Balearic Sea	226,219	?
Mataró	Spain	Balearic Sea	131,798	?
Blanes	Spain	Balearic Sea	42,198	?
Lloret de Mar	Spain	Balearic Sea	42,600	?
Ibiza	Spain	Balearic Sea	?	74,097
Palma de Mallorca	Spain	Balearic Sea	?	629,955
Sète	France	Gulf of Lion	45,090	?
Martigues	France	Gulf of Lion	48,818	?
Marseille	France	Gulf of Lion	?	1,322,989
Toulon	France	Gulf of Lion	?	605,875
Fréjus	France	Ligurian Sea	58,499	?
Cannes	France	Ligurian Sea	74,040	?
Antibes	France	Ligurian Sea	76,612	?
Nice	France	Ligurian Sea	?	1,143,557
Ajaccio	France	None	?	89,687
Monaco	Monaco	Ligurian Sea	38,423	Not listed
Sanremo	Italy	Ligurian Sea	?	145,677
Savona	Italy	Ligurian Sea	?	114,419
Genoa	Italy	Ligurian Sea	?	717,077
La Spezia	Italy	Ligurian Sea	?	166,312
Massa	Italy	Ligurian Sea	?	178,956
Viareggio	Italy	Ligurian Sea	?	129,122
Livorno	Italy	Ligurian Sea	?	166,651
Rome	Italy	Tyrrhenian Sea	?	3,684,930
Anzio	Italy	Tyrrhenian Sea	?	166,477
Naples	Italy	Tyrrhenian Sea	?	4,095,364
Salerno	Italy	Tyrrhenian Sea	?	383,138
Reggio Calabria	Italy	Ionian Sea	?	197,409
Taranto	Italy	Ionian Sea	?	261,786
Brindisi	Italy	Adriatic Sea	?	82,963
Bari	Italy	Adriatic Sea	?	608,350
Molfetta	Italy	Adriatic Sea	?	68,218
Bisceglie	Italy	Adriatic Sea	?	54,511
Trani	Italy	Adriatic Sea	?	55,893
Barletta	Italy	Adriatic Sea	?	95,073
Pescara	Italy	Adriatic Sea	?	409,604
Ancona	Italy	Adriatic Sea	?	123,539
Pesaro	Italy	Adriatic Sea	?	117,048
Rimini	Italy	Adriatic Sea	?	297,464
Mestre	Italy	Adriatic Sea	?	391,880
Venice	Italy	Adriatic Sea	?	78,994
Trieste	Italy	Adriatic Sea	?	220,012
Messina	Italy	Ionian Sea	?	255,141
Catania	Italy	Ionian Sea	?	765,469
Syracuse	Italy	Ionian Sea	?	109,023
Gela	Italy	None	?	67,694
Trapani	Italy	Tyrrhenian Sea	?	104,142
Palermo	Italy	Tyrrhenian Sea	?	955,720
Cagliari	Italy	Tyrrhenian Sea	?	382,558
Valletta	Malta	None	?	479,905
Koper	Slovenia	Adriatic Sea	25,753	Not listed
Pula	Croatia	Adriatic Sea	?	52,220
Rijeka	Croatia	Adriatic Sea	?	196,336
Zadar	Croatia	Adriatic Sea	?	89,670
Split	Croatia	Adriatic Sea	?	277,611
Neum	Bosnia and Herzegovina	Adriatic Sea	4,653	Not listed
Dubrovnik	Croatia	Adriatic Sea	65,808	Not listed
Budva	Montenegro	Adriatic Sea	24,667	Not listed
Durrës	Albania	Adriatic Sea	?	203,101
Sarandë	Albania	Adriatic Sea	?	22,613
Vlorë	Albania	Adriatic Sea	?	87,252
Corfu	Greece	Ionian Sea	23.541	
Preveza	Greece	Ionian Sea	30.816	
Corinth	Greece	Ionian Sea	30.841	
Patras	Greece	Ionian Sea	170.934	204,247
Kalamata	Greece	Ionian Sea	57.706	
Salamis	Greece	Aegean Sea	24.537	
Elefsina	Greece	Aegean Sea	24.971	
Athens	Greece	Aegean Sea	3.190.154	3,618,860
Artemida	Greece	Aegean Sea	21.924	
Chalcis	Greece	Aegean Sea	64.490	95,612
Volos	Greece	Aegean Sea	117.487	131,232
Thessaloniki	Greece	Aegean Sea	802.392	1,011,795
Kavala	Greece	Aegean Sea	51.947	
Alexandroupolis	Greece	Aegean Sea	59.476	
Mytilene	Greece	Aegean Sea	31.714	
Chios	Greece	Aegean Sea	27.015	
Kos	Greece	Aegean Sea	21.430	
Rhodes	Greece	Aegean Sea	54.562	
Chania	Greece	Aegean Sea	54.559	109,551
Rethymnon	Greece	Aegean Sea	34.085	
Heraklion	Greece	Aegean Sea	158.469	202,711
Ayvalik	Turkey	Aegean Sea	74,030	
İzmir	Turkey	Aegean Sea	4,493,000	3,085,000
Kusadasi	Turkey	Aegean Sea	130,835	
Didim	Turkey	Aegean Sea	97,000	
Bodrum	Turkey	None	?	175,000
Marmaris	Turkey	None	?	97,818
Fethiye	Turkey	None	?	125,887
Antalya	Turkey	None	?	1,385,471
Alanya	Turkey	None	?	364,000
Mersin	Turkey	None	?	1,030,220
İskenderun	Turkey	None	?	251,682
Famagusta	Northern Cyprus	None	?	91,307
Kyrenia	Northern Cyprus	None	?	96,663
Larnaca	Cyprus	None	?	155,753
Limassol	Cyprus	None	?	262,000
Paphos	Cyprus	None	?	100,175
Akrotiri (village)	Akrotiri and Dhekelia	None	?	Not listed
Latakia	Syria	None	?	551,140
Jableh	Syria	None	?	104,496
Baniyas	Syria	None	?	87,229
Tartus	Syria	None	?	129,710
Tripoli	Lebanon	None	?	462,519
Beirut	Lebanon	None	?	2,165,018
Sidon	Lebanon	None	?	298,405
Tyre	Lebanon	None	?	118,612
Haifa	Israel	None	?	831,987
Netanya	Israel	None	?	508,666
Tel Aviv	Israel	None	?	3,174,057
Ashdod	Israel	None	?	372,195
Ashkelon	Israel	None	?	126,699
Gaza	Palestine	None	?	1,772,136
Deir al-Balah	Palestine	None	?	310,820
Arish	Egypt	None	?	119,958
Port Said	Egypt	None	?	809,147
Damietta	Egypt	None	?	707,216
New Mansoura	Egypt	None	?	166,372
Rosetta	Egypt	None	?	263,235
Idku	Egypt	None	?	150,636
Alexandria	Egypt	None	?	7,165,715
Marsa Matruh	Egypt	None	?	186,175
New Alamein	Egypt	None	?	
Tobruk	Libya	None	?	131,128
Derna	Libya	None	?	70,021
Benghazi	Libya	None	?	754,448
Sirte	Libya	None	?	78,941
Misrata	Libya	None	?	337,670
Zliten	Libya	None	?	143,927
Al-Khums	Libya	None	?	186,234
Tripoli	Libya	None	?	1,555,446
Zawiya	Libya	None	?	311,742
Gabès	Tunisia	None	?	194,217
Sfax	Tunisia	None	?	664,478
Mahdia	Tunisia	None	?	68,952
Ksar Hellal	Tunisia	None	?	153,664
Monastir	Tunisia	None	?	98,398
Sousse	Tunisia	None	?	636,151
Hammamet	Tunisia	None	?	258,292
Tunis	Tunisia	None	?	2,872,207
Bizerte	Tunisia	None	?	216,220
Annaba	Algeria	None	?	552,037
Skikda	Algeria	None	?	303,186
Jijel	Algeria	None	?	234,962
Béjaïa	Algeria	None	?	237,533
Algiers	Algeria	None	?	5,009,842
Mostaganem	Algeria	None	?	318,244
Arzew	Algeria	None	?	120,264
Oran	Algeria	None	?	1,330,620
Aïn El Turk	Algeria	None	?	119,131
Nador	Morocco	Alboran Sea	?	283,476
Melilla	Spain	Alboran Sea	?	81,105
Al Hoceima	Morocco	Alboran Sea	?	60,735
Tétouan	Morocco	Alboran Sea	?	565,062
Ceuta	Spain	Strait of Gibraltar	?	85,053
Tangier	Morocco	Strait of Gibraltar	?	1,232,254

== See also ==
- List of Mediterranean countries
