= Palazzo Mandelli, Piacenza =

Italian Palace

Coordinates: 45.054404°N 9.69313°E

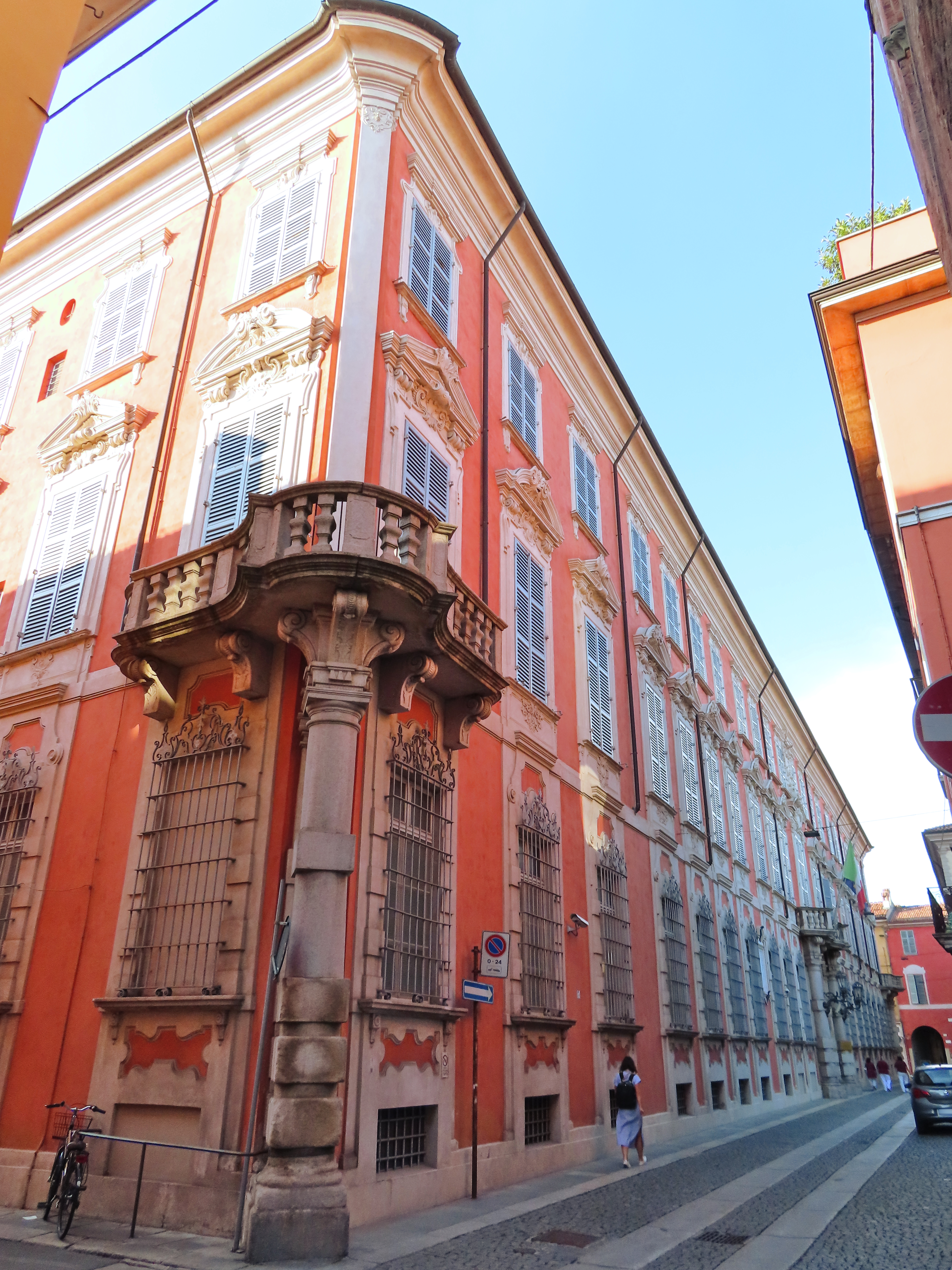
View of the Palace with corner balcony at Via San Marco, father down Via Mandelli, we can see the main portal

Palazzo Mandelli is a Baroque architecture-style palace located at the corner of Vie Bernardino Mandelli and San Marco in central Piacenza, region of Emilia-Romagna in Italy. The main portal rises in front of the church of San Dalmazio. The palace is presently home to the Banca d'Italia in Piacenza.

== History ==
The Mandelli family had roots as feudal lords in the area of Maccagno in the province of Varese, and one of the ancestors Randa had died as a captain of Milan in a battle against Federico Barbarossa. A stem of the family moved from Lombardy to Piacenza circa 1361. A captain for the Visconti Lords of Milan, Pietro Mandelli was elected podesta of the city. His descendants around the mid 18th century refurbished their property to build the present palace. The design has been attributed to Francesco Tomba, father of the better known architect Lotario.

When the family line ended in 1826, the inheritance was used to create a charitable foundation. Marchese Nicolò, who died in 1808, was a benefactor of the local Monte di Pietà and founder of the Opera Pia delle Fanciulle Povere, a form of Opera Pia Dei Poveri Mendicanti. Originally the charity was aimed to aide young women age 15–30, who were either impoverished or at risk of losing their virtue due to poverty. A charity of the same name still exists in Piacenza.

The palace was sold to various owners until acquired in 1913 by the Banca d’Italia, its present owner. The building is remarkable for its elaborate window frames and metal grills, and the corner and center balcony.
