= Annibale Ruccello =

Annibale Ruccello (7 February 1956 – 12 September 1986) was an Italian playwright, theatre director, and actor.

== Biography ==
Annibale Ruccello was born in Castellammare di Stabia, on the outskirts of Naples, Italy. His father was Ermanno Ruccello and his mother was Giuseppina de Nonno. In 1977 he graduated with a degree in philosophy from the University of Naples Federico II. As a student, he wrote a thesis on Andrea Perruci's Cantata dei Pastori (1698). His paper examined Perruci's religious piece through cultural anthropology. Ruccello was later joined a group of researchers who studied the popular traditions and language of Campania, led by Roberto De Simone, a Neapolitan composer and musicologist.

== Career ==
Ruccello began acting in Torre del Greco, Italy, when Gennaro Vitiello formed Teatro del Garage. This group included other artists like Mario Martone and Enzo Moscato. In 1978 Ruccello created his own theatre company called Il carro. With the help of Lello Guida, he began writing and staging his first plays, largely inspired by popular culture. Their repertoire included Il Rione (1973) and L'osteria del melograno. His other works include directing Rottami (Famed director Ionesco, was originally supposed to direct this work), I gioielli indiscreti (1980) by Denis Diderot, and L'asino d'oro, renamed later Ipata in 1981. (This work was based upon Asinus aureus by Lucio Apuleio.) In 1980 he debuted a solo play named Le cinque rose di Jennifer.

In 1982, his group, Il carro, merged with another theatre company named Teatro Nuovo and became Teatro Nuovo-Il Carro, based in Naples, Italy.

In 1983, Ruccello wrote Weekend (which won the Under 35 Award from the Istituto di Dramma Italiano) and Notturno di donna con ospiti. He won further awards in 1988 following the premiere of his comedy, Ferdinando, in February 1986 (San Severo, Teatro Verdi). This piece won two IDI awards: the first in 1985 as a dramatic work and the second in 1986 for the best staging. The original production had design by Franco Autiero, with Isa Danieli (who happened to inspire the character in the first place) in the leading role. Later on, Ferdinando was performed in Paris in 2000 at Théatre du Rond-Point, dubbed by Adriana Asti in French. This production continued to Liegi at the Théatre Le Moderne and, in Bruxelles at Union Dramatique in 2008.

In 1985, Ruccello also directed a theatrical adaptation of the novel La ciociara by Alberto Moravia, which was also staged in 2010 by the director and stage designer Roberta Torre. Ruccello's work as playwright ended with Anna Cappelli and Mamma: piccole tragedie minimali, in competition for the Primo Premio Gennaro Vitiello in May 1986.

On 12 September 1986, while returning from a trip to Rome, Ruccello died in a car accident on the Roma-Napoli motorway. The driver of the car, Stefano Tosi, an actor, was also killed. Ruccello is buried in Castellammare di Stabia.

During the years following his death, Ruccello's body of work has found further recognition. He is considered one of the most original voices in Italian theatre of the late twentieth century.

== Published works ==
Il sole e la maschera. Un'analisi antropologica della Cantata dei pastori, Napoli, Guida, 1978 (ed. agg. Stamperia del Valentino, Napoli, 2008).

Villa dei Misteri, in Babilonia, n. 45, April 1987.

Ferdinando, Napoli: Guida, 1988

Teatro, Napoli: Guida, 1993.

Scritti inediti: una commedia e dieci saggi, con un percorso critico di Rita Picchi, Roma, Gremese, 2004. ISBN 88-8440-307-3

Teatro, Milano, Ubulibri, 2005.

Teatro, introduzione di Enrico Fiore, Milano, Ubulibri, 2005. ISBN 978-88-7748-273-0

== Bibliography ==
=== Studies about Annibale Ruccello ===
- Aa.Vv., Dopo Eduardo. Nuova drammaturgia a Napoli, a cura di L. Libero, Napoli, Guida, 1988.
- Aa.Vv., Il segno della voce. Attori e teatro a Napoli negli anni '80, Napoli, Electa, 1989.
- Siro Ferrone, Il Ferdinando tra gravità e leggerezza, in Dossier: Eduardo De Filippo e la sua eredità, a cura di F. Taviani, in Lettera dall'Italia, n. 19, 1990.
- R. Tomasino, Il teatro di Ruccello fra tradizione ed eccesso, in Teatro italiano, a cura di P. Carriglio – G. Strehler, I, Roma-Bari, Laterza, 1993.
- T. Megale, Annibale Ruccello. Antropologia e memoria, in Drammaturgia, n. 4, 1997.
- Enrico Fiore, Ruccello, in Dizionario dello spettacolo del Novecento, a cura di F. Cappa – P. Gelli, Milano, Baldini e Castoldi, 1998.
- Aa.Vv., Ricordando Annibale Ruccello, Castellammare di Stabia, Eidos, 2000.
- Enrico Fiore, Il rito, l'esilio e la peste. Percorsi nel nuovo teatro napoletano: Manlio Santanelli, Annibale Ruccello, Enzo Moscato, Milano, Ubulibri, 2002.
- M. Palumbo, La funzione degli spazi: da Raffaele Viviani ad Annibale Ruccello, in La civile letteratura. Studi sull'Ottocento e il Novecento offerti ad Antonio Palermo, II, Napoli, Liguori, 2002.
- D. Di Bernardo, Dopo Eduardo: la lingua e la nuova drammaturgia di Annibale Ruccello, in Eduardo De Filippo scrittore, a cura di N. De Blasi – T. Fiorino, Napoli, Dante & Descartes, 2004.
- D. Di Bernardo, Il plurilinguismo dei drammi di Annibale Ruccello tra espressivismo e mimesi, in Linguistica e letteratura, nn. 1*2, 2006.
- D. Tomasello, Il fascino discreto della tradizione. Annibale Ruccello drammaturgo, Bari, Edizioni di Pagina, 2008.
- F. Cuomo, Dei volti che ha Medusa. La drammaturgia del rischio. Ermeneutica e testo nel teatro di Autiero, Moscato, Ruccello, Castellammare di Stabia, Longobardi, 2008.
- Mariano d'Amora, Se cantar mi fai d'amore.La drammaturgia di Annibale Ruccello, Roma, Bulzoni, 2011.
- Andrea Jelardi, Annibale Ruccello, una vita troppo breve, una vita per il teatro (prefazione di Isa Danieli), Kairos, Napoli 2016. ISBN 978-88-99114-55-8.

== Interviews ==
- E. De Filippo, Il peggiore dei mestieri. Intervista a Corrado Augias, in L'Espresso, 29 dicembre 1968.
- R. Di Giammarco, Non chiamatemi autore: sono un allestitore e un ex antropologo, in la Repubblica, 27 marzo 1984.
- T. Marrone, L'ultimo grido è: fuori l'autore! (intervista a Annibale Ruccello e Enzo Moscato), in Il Mattino, 21 settembre 1985.
- Annibale Ruccello, Una drammaturgia sui corpi, in Sipario, n. 466, marzo*aprile, 1987.
- I. Danieli, In scena senza Annibale, in Corriere della Sera, 22 gennaio 1987.
- E. Moscato, Babelicantes, in Aa.Vv., Teatro, a cura di G. Carillo, Napoli, Cronopio, 1997.
- R. Di Giammarco, Asti: così Ruccello diventa transalpino. L'intervista, in la Repubblica, 5 giugno 2000.
