= Museo Liverino =

Coral museum in Torre del Greco, Naples, Italy

Coral Museum - Private Collection Liverino
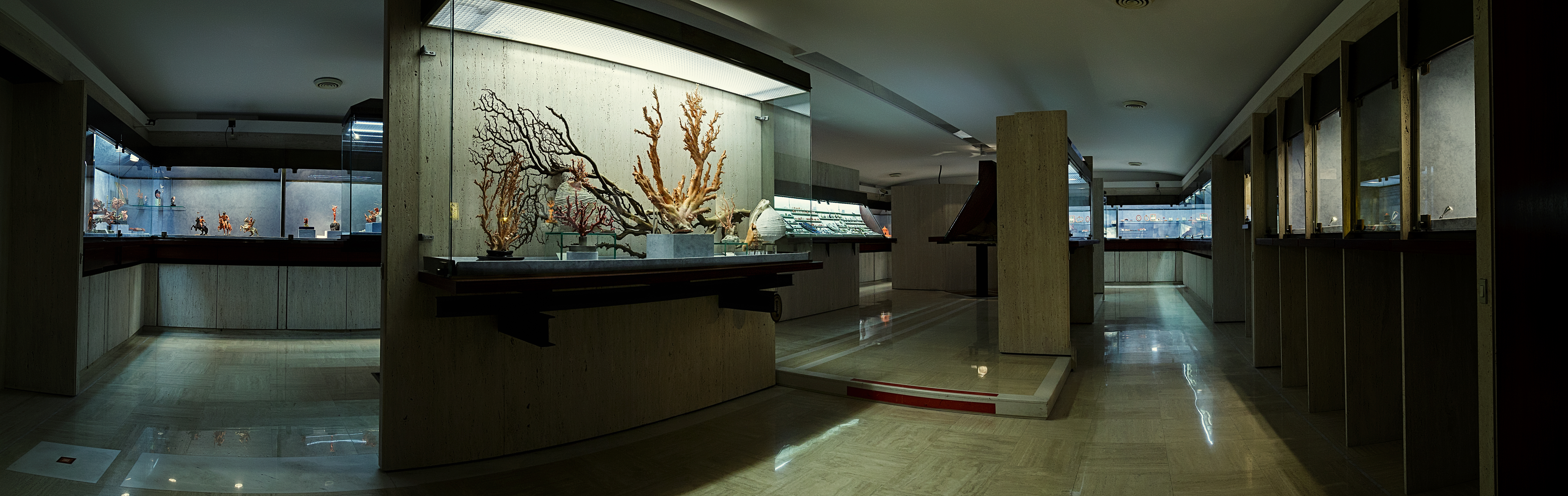
- Location: Torre del Greco

Coral Museum - Private Collection Liverino is a coral museum located in Torre del Greco, a town in the Province of Naples, in Italy.

For over five generations, the Liverino family has produced and processed coral. The strong bond that has always linked them to the Red Gold has transcended the purely business interest to give life to a unique collection, which began in 1934 with a 16-years-old Basilio Liverino. A collection of more than 1.000 items of sculptures and jewellery made of coral and precious stones, hosted today in the family museum, comes from Basilio's passion for the coral and his discoveries made during his travels in Asia.

The collection is composed by artistic creations from all over the world, dating back to the sixteenth century, artisans’ masterpieces.

It is noted in particular for its coral works, by artists such as Carlo Parlati and Romolo Grassi.
