= Nicola Lagnena =

Italian footballer

Nicola Gianluca Lagnena
Personal information
- Date of birth: 25 November 1986 (age 39)
- Place of birth: Torre del Greco, Italy
- Height: 1.85 m (6 ft 1 in)
- Position: Defender

Team information
- Current team: S.S. Cavese 1919

Senior career*
Years	Team	Apps	(Gls)
2004–2005	F.C. Savoia 1908	4	(0)
Oct.2004–2008	F.C. Turris 1944 A.S.D.	75	(1)
2008–2009	S.S. Scafatese Calcio 1922	32	(1)
2009–	S.S. Cavese 1919		
- * Club domestic league appearances and goals as of December 1, 2009

Nicola Lagnena (born 25 November 1986, in Torre del Greco) is an Italian football defender who plays for S.S. Cavese 1919.

== Caps on Italian Series ==
Serie C2: 32 Caps, 1 Goal

Serie D: 79 Caps, 1 Goal

Total: 111 Caps, 1 Goal

== See also ==
- Football in Italy
- List of football clubs in Italy
