= List of countries on the Mediterranean Sea =

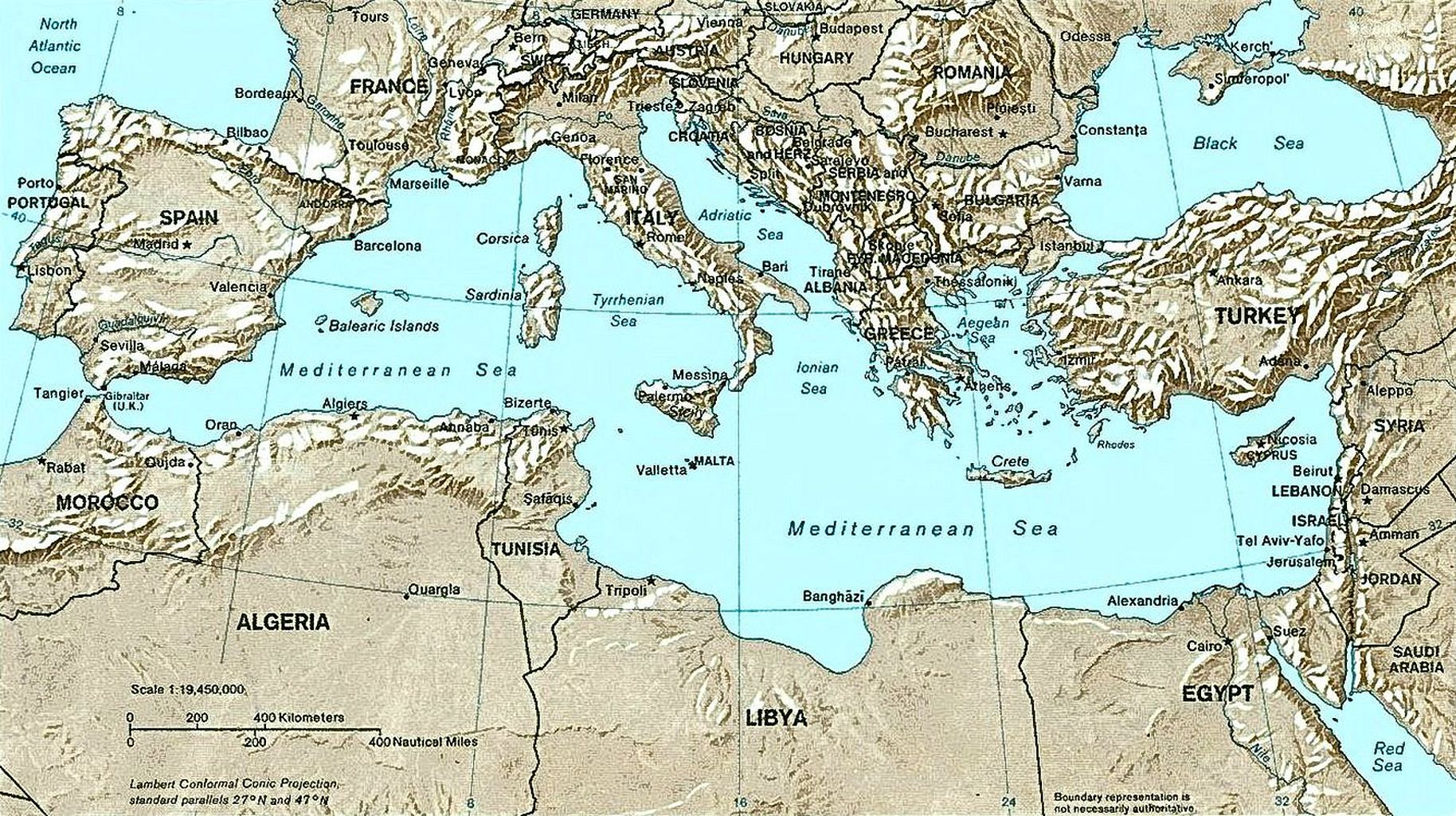
Political map of the Mediterranean Sea as of September 2004.

The Mediterranean countries are those that surround the Mediterranean Sea or are located within the Mediterranean Basin. Twenty sovereign states in Southern Europe, Western Asia and North African border the sea itself, while two island nations are completely surrounded by it (Malta and Cyprus); additionally, the United Kingdom is present through two British Overseas Territories: Gibraltar in the west and Akrotiri & Dhekelia in the east.

While not having a coastline in the Mediterranean, Portugal, Andorra, San Marino, Vatican City, Kosovo, Serbia, North Macedonia, Bulgaria, and Jordan are sometimes classified as Mediterranean countries based on their geographical, economic, geopolitical, historical, ethnic and cultural (language, art, music, cuisine) ties to the region as a whole.

== List of countries on the Mediterranean Sea ==
Below is the list of the countries and territories bordering the Mediterranean, listed clockwise from Gibraltar on the southern tip of the Iberian Peninsula:

Southern European coast, from west to east

- Spain
- Gibraltar (British Overseas Territory)
- France
- Monaco
- Italy
- Malta
- Slovenia
- Croatia
- Bosnia and Herzegovina
- Montenegro
- Albania
- Greece
- Cyprus
- Turkey (East Thrace)

Western Asian coast, from north to south

- Turkey (Anatolia)
- Cyprus
- Akrotiri and Dhekelia (British Overseas Territory)
- Syria
- Lebanon
- Israel
- Palestine (Gaza Strip)

Northern African coast, from east to west

- Egypt
- Libya
- Tunisia
- Algeria
- Morocco

== List of countries in the Mediterranean Basin ==
Below is the list of the countries and territories in the biogeographical Mediterranean Basin.

Southern Europe

- Portugal
- Spain
- Gibraltar (British Overseas Territory)
- France
- Monaco
- Italy
- Malta
- Slovenia
- Croatia
- Bosnia and Herzegovina
- Montenegro
- Albania
- Greece
- Cyprus
- Akrotiri and Dhekelia (British Overseas Territory)
- Turkey

Western Asia

- Akrotiri and Dhekelia (British Overseas Territory)
- Cyprus
- Israel
- Jordan
- Lebanon
- Palestine
- Syria
- Turkey

Northern Africa

- Algeria
- Egypt
- Libya
- Morocco
- Tunisia

== Other countries ==
- List of countries in the Mediterranean Basin by ecoregion
- List of countries in the drainage basin of the Mediterranean Sea

== See also ==
- List of coastal settlements of the Mediterranean Sea
- Eastern Mediterranean
