= Carlo Parlati =

Italian sculptor

Carlo Parlati (1934–2003?) was an Italian sculptor. He was born in Torre del Greco in the Province of Naples. Some of his works are on display in the Museo Liverino in Torre del Greco including his innovative coral sculptures.
