= Mimmo Liguoro =

Italian journalist (1941–2026)

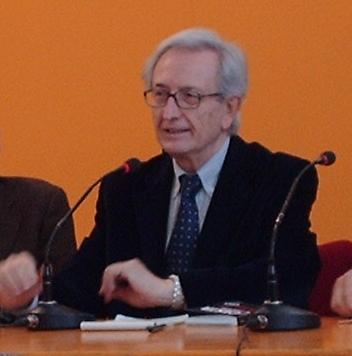
Liguoro in 2008

Domenico "Mimmo" Liguoro (16 July 1941 – 18 February 2026) was an Italian journalist. He was chief editor and host of TG2 from 1982 to 1995 and TG3 from 1995 to 2006.

Liguoro was born in Torre del Greco on 16 July 1941. He died on 18 February 2026, at the age of 84.

== Sources ==
- www.telegiornaliste.com (in Italian)
