= Gioacchino Vitelli =

Italian painter

Gioacchino Vitelli, (Torre del Greco, born circa 1785) was an Italian painter of portraits and sacred subjects. In 1814, he painted a copy of Andrea Sabbatini's Adoration of Magi for the Duomo di Salerno.
