= Tobia Polese =

Italian painter (1865–1905)

Tobia Polese or Tobias Polese (January 19, 1865 – 1905) was an Italian painter.

He was born in Torre del Greco, in the province of Naples, and studied in the Institute of Fine Arts of Naples. He graduated in 1882, and the next two years was able to win bronze and silver medals for his vedute. Among his works: Giovedì santo; Bimbo adorato; Come bolle!, and Gioie materne. This last painting was exhibited at Bologna in 1890. By 1898, he had settled in Buenos Aires, Argentina where he had established a studio.
