= Vincent Romano =

Italian Roman Catholic priest (1751–1831)

Saint Vincenzo Romano
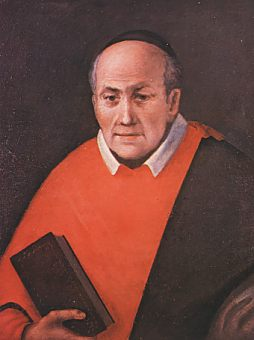
- Portrait c. 1800.

Priest
- Born: 3 June 1751; Torre del Greco, Naples, Kingdom of Naples
- Died: 20 December 1831 (aged 80); Torre del Greco, Naples, Kingdom of the Two Sicilies
- Venerated in: Roman Catholic Church
- Beatified: 17 November 1963, Saint Peter's Basilica, Vatican City by Pope Paul VI
- Canonized: 14 October 2018, Saint Peter's Square, Vatican City by Pope Francis
- Major shrine: Basilica di Santa Croce, Italy
- Feast: 20 December; 29 November (Naples & Torre del Greco)
- Attributes: Priest's attire; Crucifix; Book of Hours
- Patronage: Torre del Greco; Orphans; Sailors; Against throat tumors; Neapolitan priests

Vincenzo Romano (3 June 1751 – 20 December 1831) – born Vincenzo Domenico Romano – was an Italian Roman Catholic priest born in Torre del Greco in Naples. Romano was a parish priest of the village of Herculano who was noted for his simplistic and frugal manner of living and for his great care of orphans. But the French invaders in his area in addition to some of the Italian political groups oppressed him and his work. The people of Torre del Greco granted him the nickname "The Worker Priest" due to Romano's tireless work with the poor and for his commitment to the social needs of all people in the Neapolitan region. He was also noted for his efforts in rebuilding much of Naples following the 1794 eruption of Mount Vesuvius in which he himself cleared rubble and organized rebuilding efforts.

Pope Paul VI beatified him in late 1963 after the recognition of his holiness as well as the confirmation of two miracles attributed to his intercession. The cause for his canonization had been opened on 22 September 1843 and Pope Leo XIII had named him as Venerable in 1895. Pope Francis confirmed his canonization which was celebrated in Saint Peter's Square on 14 October 2018.

== Life ==
Vincenzo Romano was born on 3 June 1751 to poor parents Nicola Luca and Maria Grazia Rivieccio in Via Piscopia in the town of Torre del Greco in metropolitan Naples. Romano was baptized on 4 June in the Santa Croce church as "Domenico Vincenzo Michele Romano" and was named Vincenzo in honor of the Romano's favorite saint Vincent Ferrer (the Romano's fostered a longtime devotion to him). Two brothers included Pietro (b. 1739) and Giuseppe.

He studied the writings of Alphonsus Maria de' Liguori and he developed a strong devotion to the Blessed Sacrament as a child. His vocation for becoming part of the religious life matured at the time he was fourteen due to the education on the part of Father Agostino Scognamiglio. His father had wanted him to become a goldsmith but could see his son's ecclesial inclinations from his childhood and relented to his son's wishes. His older brother Pietro – himself a priest – supported him in his desire. But going to commence such studies proved difficult since Cardinal Antonino Sersale imposed new admission rules that made it harder to enter. But a patron helped him gain admittance so he could commence his religious education and formation.

He commenced his studies for the priesthood in Naples at the age of fourteen and was ordained as a priest on 10 June 1775 in the Basilica di Santa Restituta. Romano celebrated his first Mass on 11 June in Santa Croce. During his studies for becoming a priest he had as his spiritual guide Mariano Arciero and also studied the life and teachings of Alphonsus Maria de' Liguori. He was assigned to Torre del Greco and was noted for his simple and austere life as well as his devotion to the care of orphans and work with seminarians.

Romano worked to rebuild what was damaged after the eruption of Mount Vesuvius on 15 June 1794 and this included re-building his church – that of Santa Croce – on his own. He devoted hours to organizing rebuilding efforts following the disaster and even cleared a great deal of rubble himself with his own hands. It was at the time of the disaster that he served as Santa Croce's treasurer and assistant pastor. He dealt with the rebuilding in 1795 and the church was re-consecrated in 1827. After the death of the parish priest in 1799 he became the provost of the parish and devoted himself to the re-building of the church. He paid careful attention to the formation of children as part of their education as well as the proclamation of the Gospel in the name of evangelization. His promotion of education was also motivated due to his care for orphans who often had a poor education themselves; Romano dedicated himself to promoting a sold Christian formation for all children. French invaders of the area oppressed him in addition to the various Italian political groups.

He preached to all people and five times at the end of the week. His priest nephew – Felice Romano (b. 1793) – stated that his uncle's preaching was simple and was aimed to educate the faithful. He was often distinguished with the Crucifix he had in his hand. On 1 January 1825 he fell and fractured his left femur which began a slow decline in his health.

Romano died on 20 December 1831 after battling a long illness and his remains are interred in his Santa Croce church. Pope John Paul II visited Naples and visited Romano's tomb on 11 November 1990. Cardinal Sisto Riario Sforza approved his exhumation for canonical assessment on 24 November 1856 while Cardinal Alessio Ascalesi approved a second exhumation on 13 October 1927 when Romano's remains were moved closer to his nephew Felice's remains. Cardinal Alfonso Castaldo approved a third exhumation on 7 September 1963 in which Romano's remains were placed in a bronze and glass urn. But on 4 March 1982 an application was made for another exhumation due to conservation complications which Cardinal Corrado Ursi oversaw from 1–4 July 1982. His remains were then reinterred on 22 November 1982 after inspection and exposure for veneration.

== Canonization ==
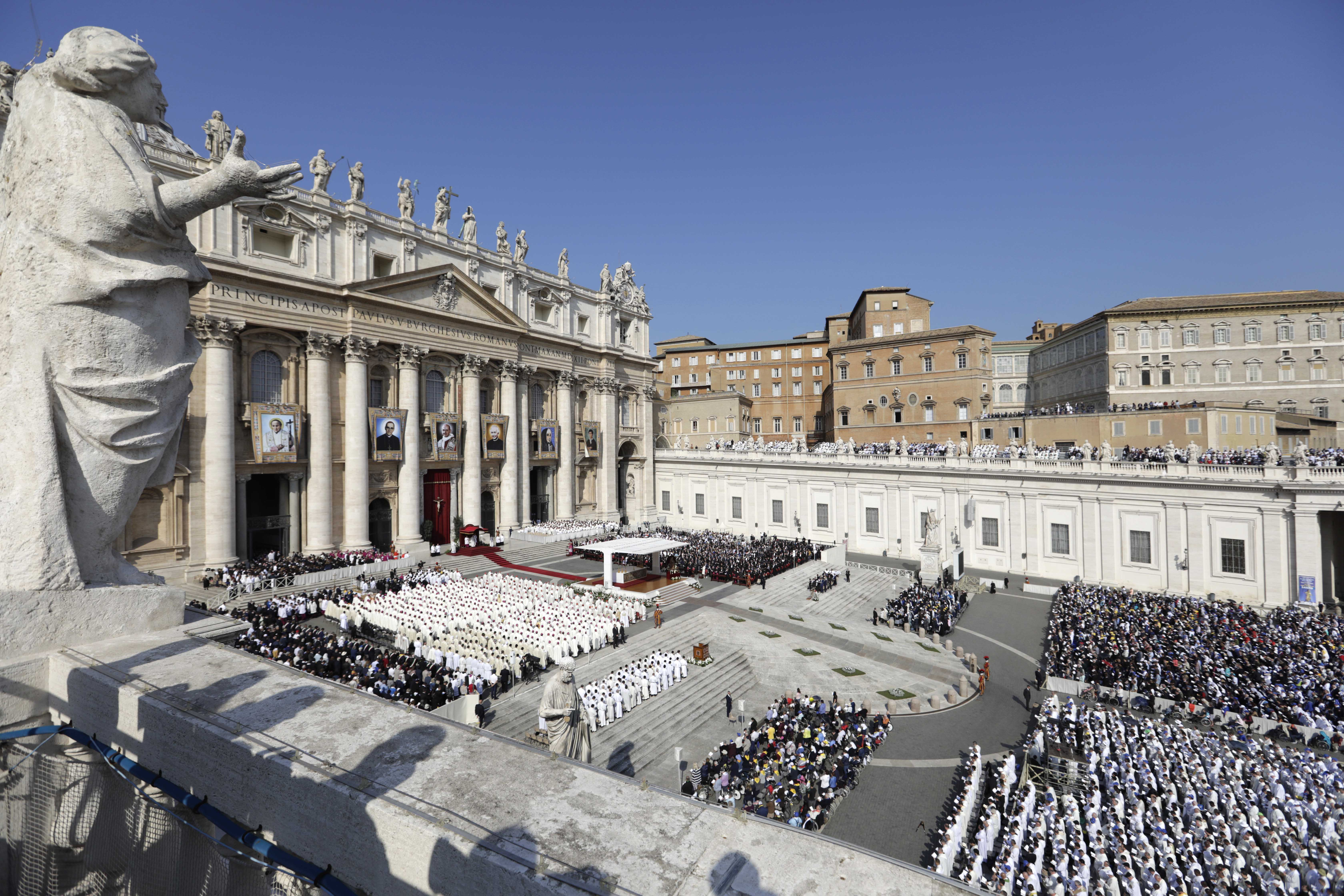
Romano's canonization in October 2018.

The beatification process commenced under Pope Gregory XVI on 22 September 1843 and this start to the cause enabled Romano to be titled as a Servant of God. The opening of the cause saw two local diocesan processes open in Naples to gather documents for the cause and the testimonies of individuals with the first being from 1846 to 1850 and another from 1853 to 1858. His two brothers Giuseppe and Pietro as well as his nephew Felice and niece Maria Grazia testified in the beatification proceedings. Theologians approved Romano's spiritual writings on 28 September 1886. The processes were both ratified and sent to Rome for evaluation. The first meeting held in Rome to discuss the cause confirmed approval on 13 August 1890 as did two further board meetings conducted on 11 July 1893 and on 4 December 1894 which would then enable papal approval.

On 25 March 1895 he was declared to be Venerable after Pope Leo XIII recognized that Romano had lived a model Christian life of heroic virtue. Two miracles were placed under the investigation of a diocesan tribunal for evaluation and both soon received papal approval which allowed for Pope Paul VI to preside over Romano's beatification on 17 November 1963. The first miracle – concerning an 1891 healing – was investigated from 1894 to 1895 while the second miracle was investigated from 1941 to 1942. One committee in Rome confirmed the miraculous nature of this healing as did a second on 28 April 1963 and a third on 24 September 1963. This allowed Paul VI to confirm his beatification in a decree promulgated on 5 October 1963.

The third miracle required for his canonization was subjected to a diocesan tribunal in Naples and concluded its business on 14 September 2015 in a Mass that Cardinal Crescenzio Sepe presided over to seal the boxes of documentation prior to sending them to the Congregation for the Causes of Saints for additional evaluation. The C.C.S. received the boxes of documentation from the process on 1 February 2016 which allowed for the so-called "Roman Phase" of the process to commence. This phase is the one in which the miracle is placed under intensive medical and theological investigation to determine if the healing in question is indeed a miracle through Romano's intercession. The C.C.S. validated the diocesan process for the alleged miracle on 21 June 2016 with a team of medical experts approving the miraculous nature of the healing on 6 July 2017. Theologians later approved the miracle as being through Romano's intercession in a session held on 26 October 2017. The C.C.S. cardinal and bishop members approved the findings of the two previous boards and confirmed this miracle on 6 February 2018. Pope Francis confirmed this miracle on 6 March 2018 which allows for Romano's canonization; the canonization was celebrated in Saint Peter's Square on 14 October 2018.

The current postulator for this cause is the Franciscan priest Giovangiuseppe Califano.

=== Beatification miracles ===
The first miracle recognized was the healing of Maria Carmela Restucci in December 1891 from an aggressive tumor in the left breast that later developed into ulcers and lesions that were malignant. She invoked the patronage of Romano and during the evening discovered her tumors and lesions had all but disappeared. Her doctor – Giuseppe Dolce – confirmed the healing to be something science and medicine could not explain.

The second miracle that was recognized was the healing of Maria Carmela Cozzolino who was a professed religious but contracted – on 10 July 1940 – a serious throat ailment that worsened at a rapid pace that made both swallowing and breathing quite difficult for her. Doctor Francesco Brancaccio diagnosed it as throat cancer and refrained from prescribing treatment. Cozzolino invoked the intercession of Romano and began a novena to him. On the following 26 October the specialist Doctor Giovanni Spinetti asserted the potential for her death in a matter weeks. Cozzolino's condition worsened on 27 and 28 October but seemed to disappear in full on 29 October. Doctors evaluating this cure could not explain how such an instance occurred.

=== Canonization miracle ===
The miracle under assessment that led to his canonization is the cure of an Italian cancer patient.

=== Patronage ===
On 2 September 1964 in a press conference he was proclaimed as the patron for the Neapolitan priesthood. He is also the patron for Torre del Greco as well as orphans and sailors. He is also a patron against throat tumors.
