= Opera Pia Dei Poveri Mendicanti =

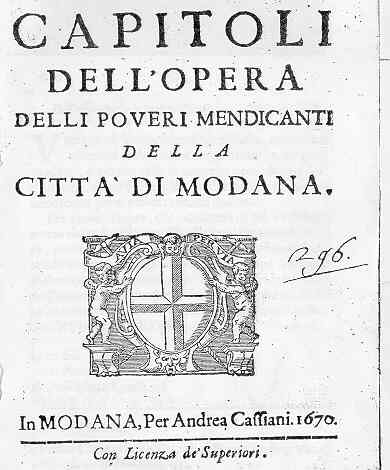

The Opera Pia dei Poveri Mendicanti was a civic welfare institutional service created in Bologna, Italy, in the 16th century by a group of ruling patricians to care for sick and poor people. The service included taking control of hostels, infirmaries, and foundling homes, as well as orphanages, which were initially controlled by confraternities. It represented the government taking control of these privately funded institutions. The reason the ruling elites decided to do this is because they believed they could provide more help than the confraternities. The plan was to ameliorate the poor through discipline, education, and by finding them sufficient work; thus, helping the people escape their perpetual poverty in a modern sense.

== Creation ==
The Opera Pia dei Poveri Mendicanti replaced an earlier plan: the Compagnia dei Poveri Mendicanti. The Opera was a Catholic based service consolidated by Pope Pius IV. Wealthy patricians worked from inside confraternities to achieve public policy in helping the poor; later, these elites became part of the Opera. In addition, some members were derived from the Senate of Bologna. The Opera amalgamated many confraternities’ charities such as Ospedale (hostels) into larger ones.

== Membership ==
Ruling elite in Bologna controlled this organization. Membership was predominantly male; however, some women also participated within it. These people, in theory, used their power and money to create public institutions to help desperate people in Bologna. It was not supposed to be as restrictive as confraternities, which tended to focus on helping particular groups of people such as: fallen nobles, women, or orphans. Instead the Opera Pia dei Poveri Mendicanti gave money and aid to all these organization types.

== Objective of the organization ==
The objective of this organization was to help the poor through reform and provide opportunities for work within the society. They also provided the necessities of life such as: food, shelter, and clothing, to those who could not afford it themselves.

== Significance ==
The Opera Pia dei Poveri Mendicanti replaced confraternities’ charities. This is because the ruling elites thought that confraternities were unable to fully provide enough support for the poor in Bologna; thus, charity became a government policy implemented by the ruling elite. Charity was a primary concern of confraternities as giving help to the poor such as feeding or clothing them was a Catholic sacrament and these organizations were Catholic- based institutions. Confraternities made it their goal to aid the unfortunate because Jesus Christ would save the souls of those who were charitable because they would be following his teachings. Charities included clothing and feeding the poor, housing orphans, as well as visiting sick people.

== Types of organizations created ==
The Opera created orphanages for young boys and girls. The girls were placed outside the city, while the boys resided in orphanages inside the city near to places where they apprenticed. In addition, a hostel called Ospedale dei Poveri Mendicanti was created in Bologna, in which people who were poor would stay. Thus, they instituted public housing of a sort. The Opera offered dowries for women that could not afford to wed such as those that resided in orphanages.

== Problems and controversy ==
Some male members accused female ones of wasting money on lavish festivals and dinners, which projected a frivolous and ostentatious image of the Opera. Thus, this occurrence portrayed the service as wasting money. As a result of the concern with the misuse of money, the Opera discouraged its members, in particular the women, from hosting events such as these and restrictions were placed on spending. The people who held the power were the male ruling elite and through the Opera, their objective was to fulfill the basic needs of the sick and poor, rather than throwing lavish parties for them.

== See also ==
- Bologna
- Greater Bologna
- Confraternities
- Sacraments of the Catholic Church

== Notes ==
=== Bibliography ===
- Donnelly, John Patrick; Maher, Michael W., eds. (1999). Confraternities and Catholic Reform in Italy, France, and Spain. Sixteenth-century essays and studies. Vol. 44. Kirksville, MO: Truman State University Press. ISBN 9781935503170.
- Eisenbichler, Konrad (1991). Crossing the Boundaries: Christian Piety and the Arts in Italian Medieval and Renaissance Confraternities. Kalamazoo, MI: Medieval Institute Publications, Western Michigan University. ISBN 9780918720450.
- Pullan, Brian S. (2005). "Catholics, Protestants, and the poor in Early Modern Europe". Journal of Interdisciplinary History. 35 (3): 441–456. doi:10.1162/0022195052564315. S2CID 143777306.
- Terpstra, Nicholas (1994). "Apprenticeship in social welfare: from confraternal charity to municipal poor relief in Early Modern Italy". Sixteenth Century Journal. 25 (1): 101–120. doi:10.2307/2542555. JSTOR 2542555.
- Terpstra, Nicholas (2004). "Showing the poor a good time: caring for body and spirit in Bologna's civic charities". Journal of Religious History. 28 (1): 19–34. doi:10.1111/j.1467-9809.2004.00203.x.
