= San Dalmazio, Piacenza =

Oratory or small chapel-church in Piacenza, Italy

Coordinates: 45.05436°N 9.69322°E

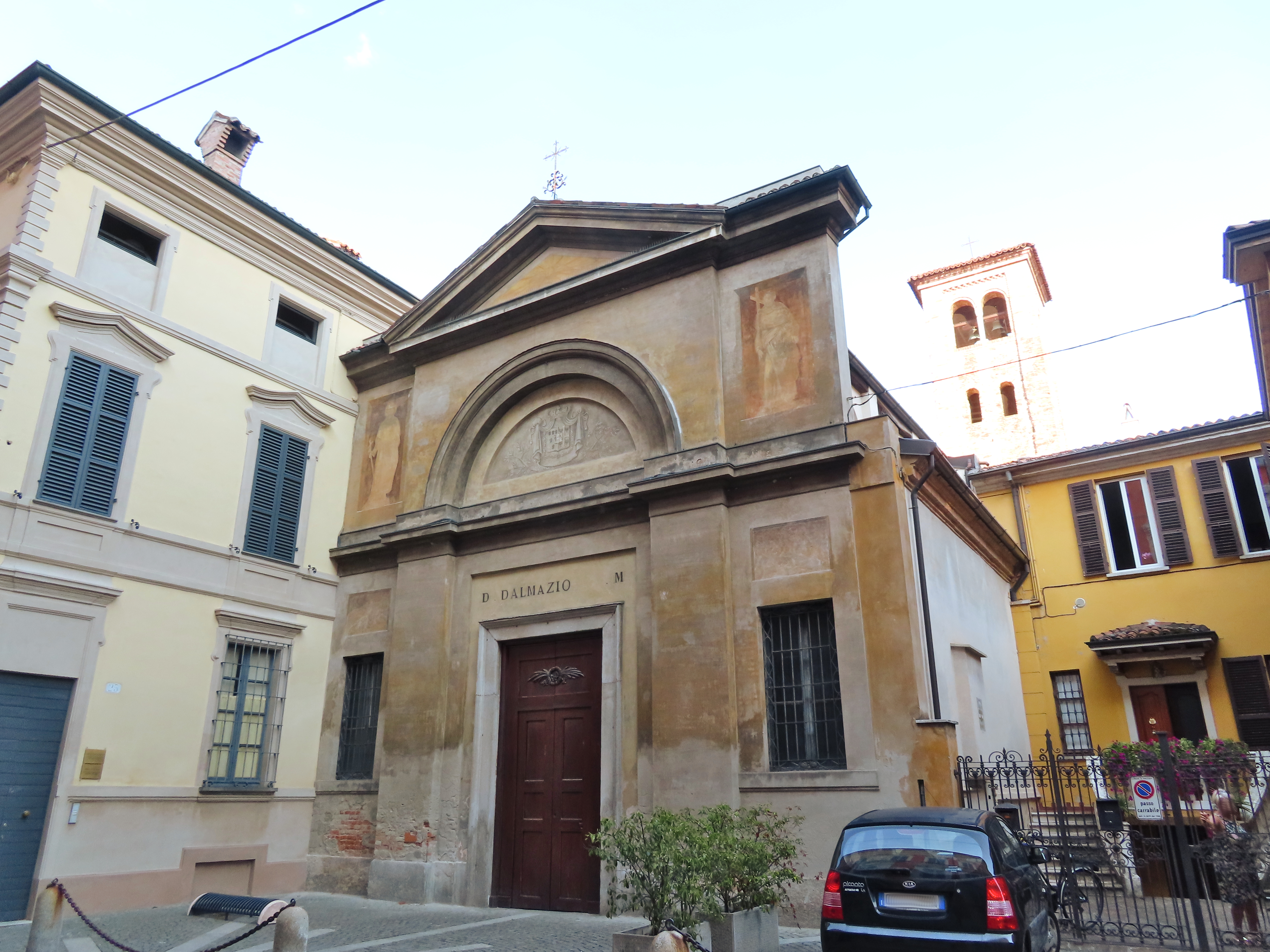
Facade of San Dalmazio

San Dalmazio is a Baroque style, Roman Catholic oratory or small chapel-church, located at via Mandelli #23, in front of the Palazzo Mandelli, in Piacenza, Region of Emilia Romagna, Italy.

== History ==
A church and a monastery at the site dates from 1040, dedicated to the 3rd century saint (San Dalmazio). The monastery was affiliated with the benedictine Abbey of Val di Tolla, that was located near Morfasso. The monastery was suppressed in the 19th century by the Bishop Scalabrini, and the church was converted in 1826 to the Oratorio ducale for Marie Louise of Austria, Duchess of Parma. In 1850, under the rule of the Bourbon Duke of Parma, Charles III, it was renamed Oratorio reale. The oratory has and still is associated with the Confraternity of the Holy Spirit (Confraternity dello Spirito Santo).

The church was originally a Romanesque structure with a nave and two aisles and now with a sober classical facade. The interior is sparsely decorated. The crypt still holds some of the Romanesque features and may date to 6th or 7th centuries.
