= Giovanni Di Cristo =

Italian judoka

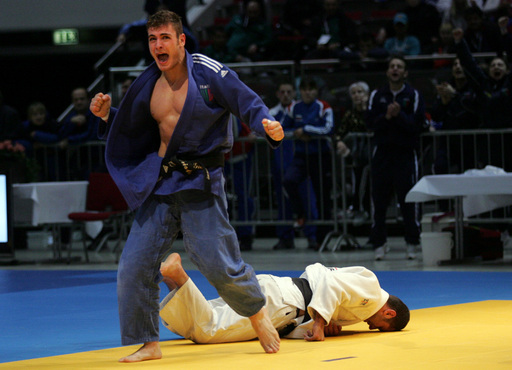

Personal information
- Born: 1 August 1986 (age 39)
- Occupation: Judoka

Sport
- Sport: Judo
- Weight class: –73 kg
Medal record
Men's judo
Representing Italy
European U23 Championships
Gold medal – first place	2007 Salzburg	–73 kg
Silver medal – second place	2008 Zagreb	–73 kg
Mediterranean Games
Gold medal – first place	2009 Pescara	–73 kg
Italy Cup Ju/Se
Gold medal – first place	2005 Rome (Ostia)	–73 kg
Italian Championships Juniores
Bronze medal – third place	2004 Genoa	–73 kg
Bronze medal – third place	2005 Castellanza (Va)	–73 kg
Italian Championships U23
Bronze medal – third place	2007 Lecce	–73 kg
Italian Championships
Gold medal – first place	2007 Monza (MI)	–73 kg
Gold medal – first place	2008 Genoa	–73 kg
Super World Cup
Silver medal – second place	2008 Rotterdam (NL)	–73 kg

Profile at external databases
- IJF: 659
- JudoInside.com: 18331
- Updated on 2 February 2022

Giovanni Di Cristo (born 1 August 1986 in Torre del Greco) is an Italian judoka.

At just six years old he started to practice judo at his local gym, in Torre del Greco near Naples. His first important successes came in the Minors category in 2001 and Cadets, when he won the Italian title in the 66 kg in 2002. He became known in the juvenile nationals and showed he was a leading athlete on the Italian judo scene, gaining two bronze medals in the junior championships of 2004 and 2005. In the same year he won the Italian junior/senior cup in Ostia. The year 2007 is the year that saw his definitive consecration in the international judo scene, winning the bronze medal in the Italian Under-23 championships, and then going on to become the Italian national champion in Monza and finally winning the gold medal in the European Under-23 Championships on 24 November 2007, in Salzburg (Aut), after crushing the competition of the other European competitors. The athlete, a new acquisition of the Guardia di Finanza, reconfirmed his high-level status in the Italian Championships in Genoa on 26 April 2008, winning 7 encounters and beating Marco Maddaloni in the final match, who had been absent in 2007.

== Achievements ==
Year	Tournament	Place	Light class
2004	Italian Judo Championships Juniores	3rd	Lightweight (73 kg)
2005	Italian Judo Championships Juniores	3rd	Lightweight (73 kg)
2005	Italy Judo Cup Ju/Se	1st	Lightweight (73 kg)
2007	Italian Judo Championships U23	3rd	Lightweight (73 kg)
2007	Italian Judo Championships	1st	Lightweight (73 kg)
2007	European Judo Championships U23	1st	Lightweight (73 kg)
2008	Italian Judo Championships	1st	Lightweight (73 kg)
2008	Super World Cup Rotterdam	2nd	Lightweight (73 kg)
2009	Game of Mediterraneo Pescara	1st	Lightweight (73 kg)
