= Nicolas De Corsi =

Italian painter (1882–1956)

Nicolas De Corsi (1882–1956) was an Italian painter. He was born in Odessa but lived in Torre del Greco for many years.
