= Ermanno Corsi =

Italian journalist and writer (1939–2025)

Ermanno Corsi (8 August 1939 – 21 June 2025) was an Italian journalist and writer.

Corsi worked for the newspapers Il Tempo and Il Mattino and was a correspondent for Il Giorno, La Repubblica, Roma, Il Mondo and L'Europeo, amongst others.

In 1994, he won the Amantea prize for historiography and was rewarded with merit by the then President Carlo Azeglio Ciampi.

He was President of Association of Neapolitan Printing from 1989 to 2007, and an adviser to the Regional Council' s Association of Journalists of Campania.

== Life and career ==
Corsi was born in Carrara, Tuscany on 8 August 1939. He moved at a very young age to Torre del Greco, and finally to Naples in 1970.

After graduating from classical high school, he earned a degree in modern literature from the University of Naples Federico II. A professional journalist since 1960, he began his career in the Naples and Rome editorial offices of Il Tempo; he then moved on to Il Mattino, becoming a special correspondent, deputy correspondent and editor of the third page. He also collaborated in various capacities with Il Giorno, la Repubblica, Roma and Il Denaro, as well as with the periodicals Il Mondo, L'Europeo, Nord and Sud. He then directed Civiltà del Mediterraneo, a consortium press organ of 11 Italian universities.

In 1978 he joined RAI, being assigned to the RAI Production Center, Naples office, where he remained until 2004: editor-in-chief of the Campania TGR, he regularly anchored it, as well as some political tribunes.

He was president of the Campania Order of Journalists from 1989 to 2007 and had leadership roles in the National Federation of the Italian Press and the Neapolitan Press Association. An honorary citizen of six municipalities in Campania, he was named commendatore al merito of the Italian Republic. He is a cousin of the famous violinist Salvatore Accardo.

Corsi died on 21 June 2025, at the age of 85.

== Works ==
- L'ultima Napoli – vicende, personaggi, inquietudini (preface by Francesco De Martino)
- Napoli Contemporanea
- La Città ogni giorno
- Mezzogiorno dimezzato
- Aspettando Capri (preface by Francesco Paolo Casavola)
- Terra di Lavoro e di progresso
- Aspetti della Campania del terzo millennio
