= Gennaro Vitiello =

Italian stage actor and director

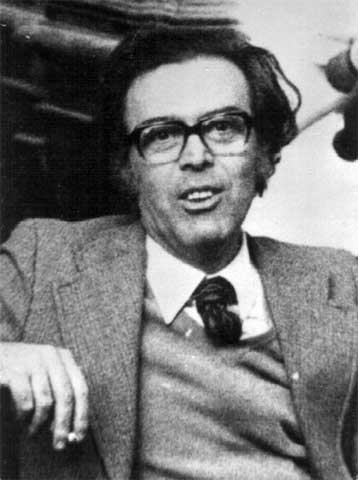

Gennaro Vitiello (15 October 1929 – 8 August 1985) was an Italian stage actor and director. He was born in Torre del Greco, in the Metropolitan City of Naples.

== Filmography ==
=== Teatro ESSE ===
- Moscheta di Ruzante, 1965
- La magia della farfalla di F. Garcia Lorca, 1966
- Sei atti unici di J. Tardieu da J. Tardieu, 1967
- Spasamiolipi di Spatola, Edoardo Sanguineti, Miccini, Achille Bonito Oliva, Pienotti
- I cenci di A. Artaud, 1967
- Massa-Uomo di E. Toller, 1968
- Il folle, la morte e i pupi da Il folle e la morte di Hugo von Hofmannsthal e Los Titeres de cachiporra di F. G. Lorca, 1968
- I negri di J. Genet, 1969
- Medea da L. Anneo Seneca, 1970
- K di Edoardo Sanguineti, 1971
- Il re nudo di E. Schwarz, 1971
- Prometeo legato di Eschilo, 1971
- Il funerale del padre di G. Manganelli, 1972

=== Libera Scena Ensemble ===
- Urfaust di J. W. Goethe, 1973
- La morte di Empedocle da J. C. F. Hölderlin, 1973
- Un matrimonio d’interesse da Los Titeres de cachiporra di F. G. Lorca, 1974
- I nuovi dolori del giovane Werther di U. Plenzdorf, 1975
- K – Il funerale del padre di E. Sanguineti e G. Manganelli, 1975
- Padrone e sotto da Il signor Puntila e il suo servo Matti di B. Brecht, 1975
- Il cacatoa verde da Arthur Schnitzler, 1977
- Mammà chi è? da Il cerchio di gesso del Caucaso di B. Brecht, 1978
- La storia di Cenerentola à la manière de... da Dodici Cenerentole in cerca d’autore di Rita Cirio, 1979
- Woyzech di Georg Büchner, 1980
- Assolo per orologio di O. Zahradnìk, 1982
- Operetta per una bambola da Los Titeres de cachiporra di F. G. Lorca, 1982
- Hinkemann di E. Toller, 1983
- Edippo di U. Foscolo, 1983
- Cabaret e forse... di G. Ranieri, 1984

== Bibliography ==
- Giulio Baffi, Nuovo teatro a Napoli, ETI S. Ferdinando, 1976.
- Franco Quadri, L'avanguardia teatrale in Italia, Einaudi Torino, 1977.
- Vanda Monaco, La contaminazione teatrale, Pàtron Bologna, 1981.
- Antonio Borriello, Samuel Beckett Krapp's Last Tape, Esi Napoli, 1992.
- Leopoldo Mastelloni, The Queen of the Sea (La regina del mare), Mario Guida Editore, Napoli, 1994.
- Gennaro Vitiello (a cura di Luigi e Raffaele Capano), Taccuino - Ricordi e note di regia, Torre del Greco, 2003.
- Eduardo Sant'Elia (a cura di), Il teatro a Napoli negli anni Novanta, Tullio Pironti Editore, Napoli, 2004.
- Annibale Ruccello, Una commedia e dieci saggi - Scritti inediti, Gremese Editore, 2004.
