= Ruggero Cappuccio =

Italian playwright

Ruggero Cappuccio (born 19 January 1964) is an Italian playwright. He was born in Torre del Greco.

== Opera ==
- Delirio marginale, 1994 (Premio IDI Autori Nuovi, 1993)
- Shakespea Re di Napoli, 1994, Rome, 1997 (Premio Speciale Drammaturgia Europea, 1994)
- Mai più amore per sempre, 1995
- Desideri mortali, un oratorio profano per Tomasi di Lampedusa, Rome, 1998
- Tieste e Bacchidi, Roma, 1998
- Il sorriso di San Giovanni, Rome, 1998 (Premio Ubu Migliore Novità Italiana, 1998, Premio Candoni)
- Edipo a Colono, Trieste, 1996 and Turin, 2001
- Paolo Borsellino essendo stato, 2006
- La notte dei due silenzi, Palermo, 2007
