= Padua–Treviso–Venice metropolitan area =

The Padua–Treviso–Venice metropolitan area (PaTreVe) or Venice city–region is the urban agglomeration centred on the cities of Padua, Treviso, and Venice in the Veneto region of northeast Italy. It is defined statistically and does not correspond to a single area of local government. Administratively it comprises the communes (municipalities) of the three cities plus another 240 communes (104 in the province of Padua, 95 in the province of Treviso and 44 in the province of Venice).

The metropolitan area has a total population of 2,600,000.
