= Palermo metropolitan area =

Metropolitan area in Italy

The Palermo metropolitan area is the urban agglomeration centred on the city of Palermo in the island of Sicily, Italy. It is defined statistically and does not correspond to a single area of local government. Administratively it comprises the comune (municipality) of Palermo plus 26 further communes, all of which fall within the Metropolitan City of Palermo.

The metropolitan area has a total population of 1.069.754 and an area of 1.391,4 km², giving a density of 750,63 people per square kilometre. It is one of the most populous metropolitan areas in Italy and the first in Sicily. 60% of the population lives within the city of Palermo.

== Composition ==
The Palermo metropolitan area includes the city of Palermo and 26 municipalities, the most important of these by population are Bagheria, Monreale, Termini Imerese, Carini and Partinico.
