= Bologna metropolitan area =

Metropolitan area in Italy

Bologna metropolitan area (Italian: Area metropolitana di Bologna) is a term for the urbanized area around the city of Bologna, Italy. The metropolitan area is composed of the cities of Anzola dell'Emilia, Calderara di Reno, Casalecchio di Reno, Castel Maggiore, Castenaso, Granarolo dell'Emilia, Pianoro, San Lazzaro di Savena, Sasso Marconi and Zola Predosa. It covers 579 km^{2} (202 sq. mi) and had a 2016 mid-year estimated population of 845,000.

== Geography ==
The Metropolitan City of Bologna, for comparison, has an area of 3,703 km^{2} and a total population of 1,017,806 (2019).

The metropolitan area is strictly statistical and does not imply any kind of administrative unity or function.
