= Torre del Greco =

Torre del Greco Torre d' 'o Grieco (Neapolitan)
- Comune
- Comune di Torre del Greco
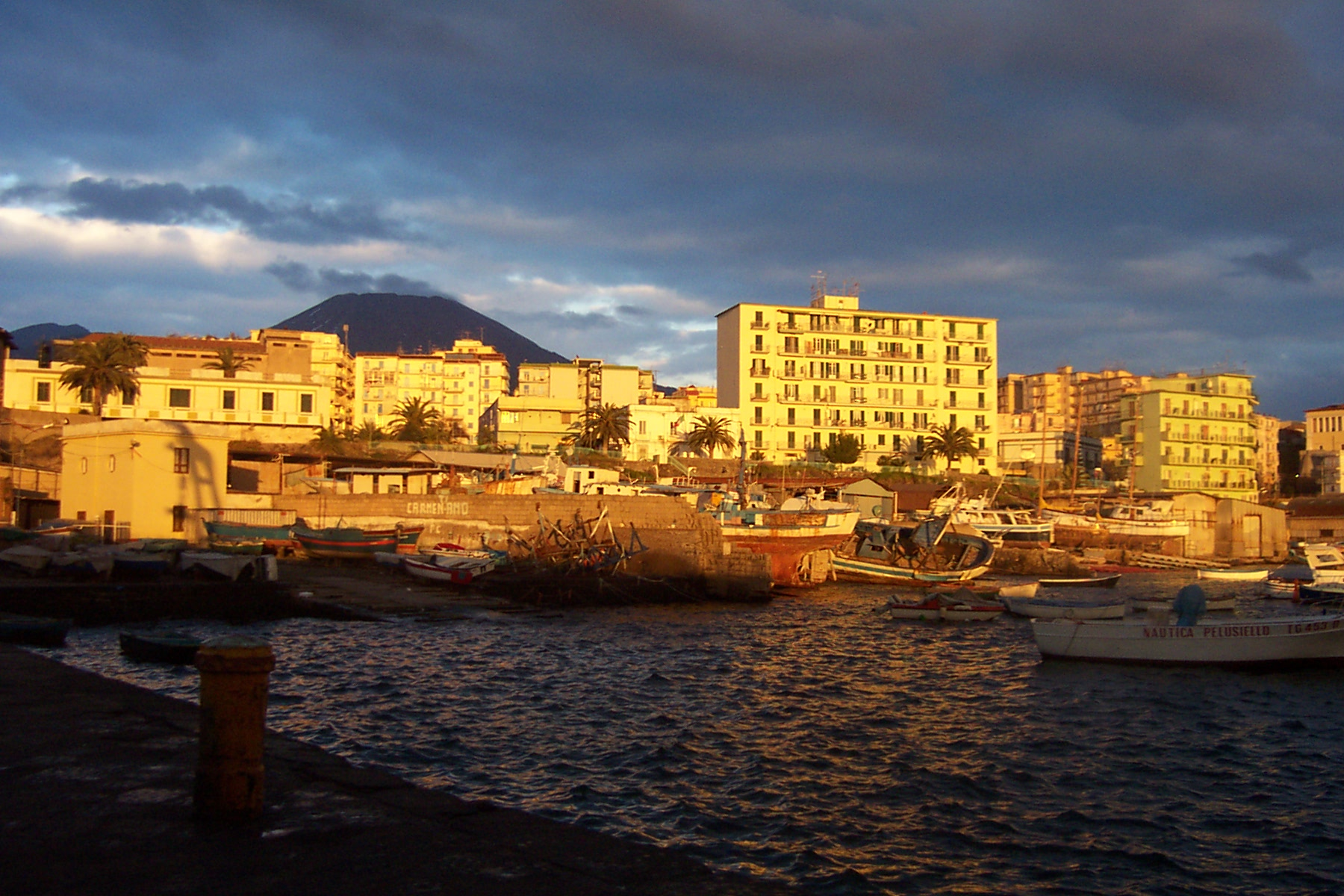
- Port of Torre del Greco

- Coat of arms
- Motto: Post fata resurgo
- Location within Italy Location within Campania
- Coordinates: 40°47′N 14°22′E
- Country: Italy
- Region: Campania
- Metropolitan city: Naples (NA)

Government
  - Mayor: Luigi Mennella

Area
  - Total: 30.63 km^{2} (11.83 sq mi)

Population (2026)
  - Total: 78,839
  - Density: 2,574/km^{2} (6,666/sq mi)
- Demonym(s): Torrese; Corallino
- Time zone: UTC+1 (CET)
  - Summer (DST): UTC+2 (CEST)
- Postal code: 80059, 80040
- Patron saint: Saint Januarius, Our Lady of the Immaculate Conception, Vincent Romano
- Saint day: September 19 (Saint Januarius), December 8 (Immaculate Conception) December 20 (Saint Vincent Romano)
- Website: Official website

Torre del Greco (Italian: [ˈtorre del ˈɡrɛːko]; Neapolitan: Torre d' 'o Grieco; "Greek man's Tower") is a comune (municipality) in the Metropolitan City of Naples in the region of Campania in southern Italy. It has 78,839 inhabitants.

The locals are sometimes called Corallini because of the once plentiful coral in the nearby sea, and because the city has been a major producer of coral jewellery and cameo brooches since the seventeenth century.

== History ==
=== Ancient period ===
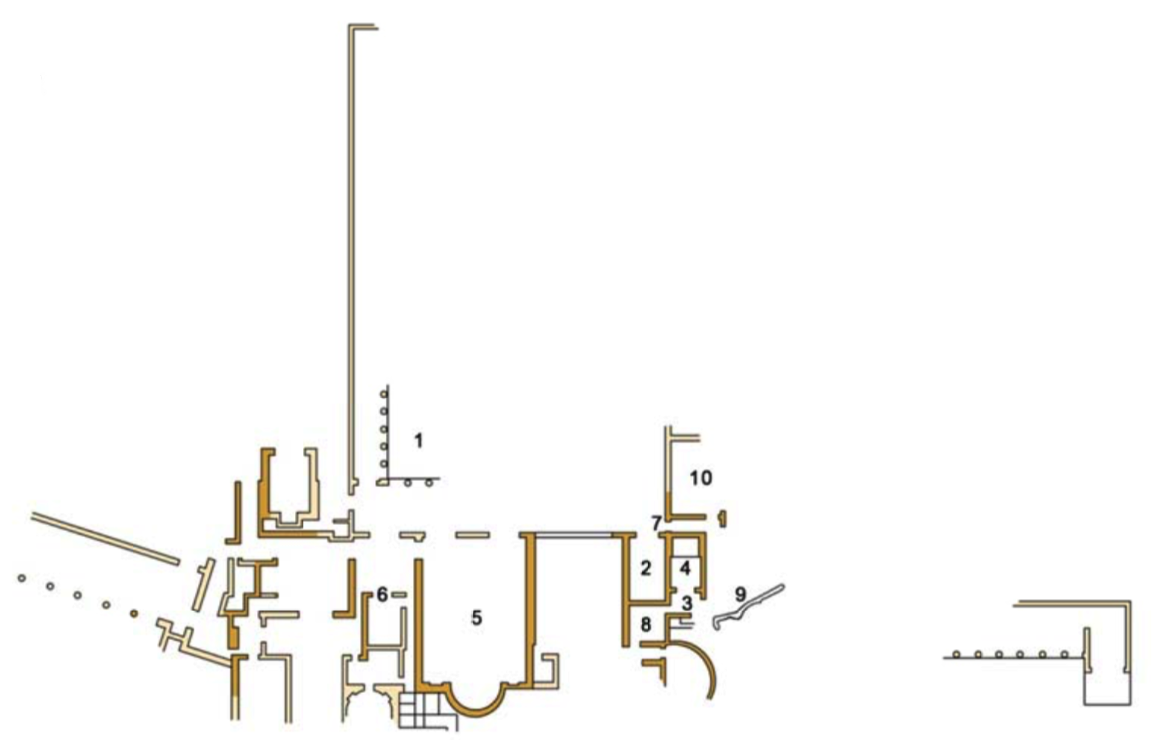
Villa Sora plan: in yellow, layout excavated in the 17th c.

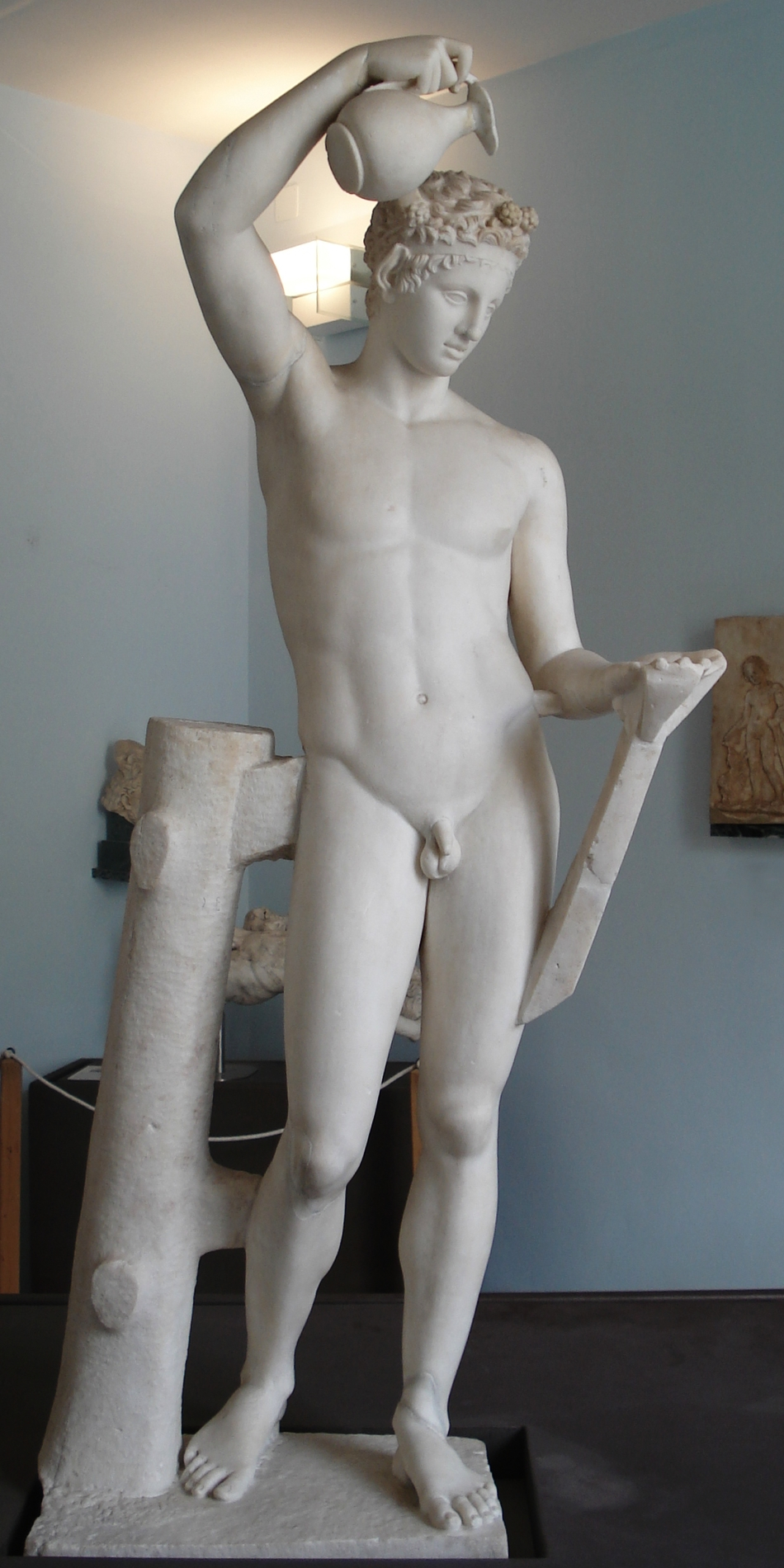
Satyr of Praxiteles (370–360 BC), Roman copy from the Villa Sora, Palermo museum

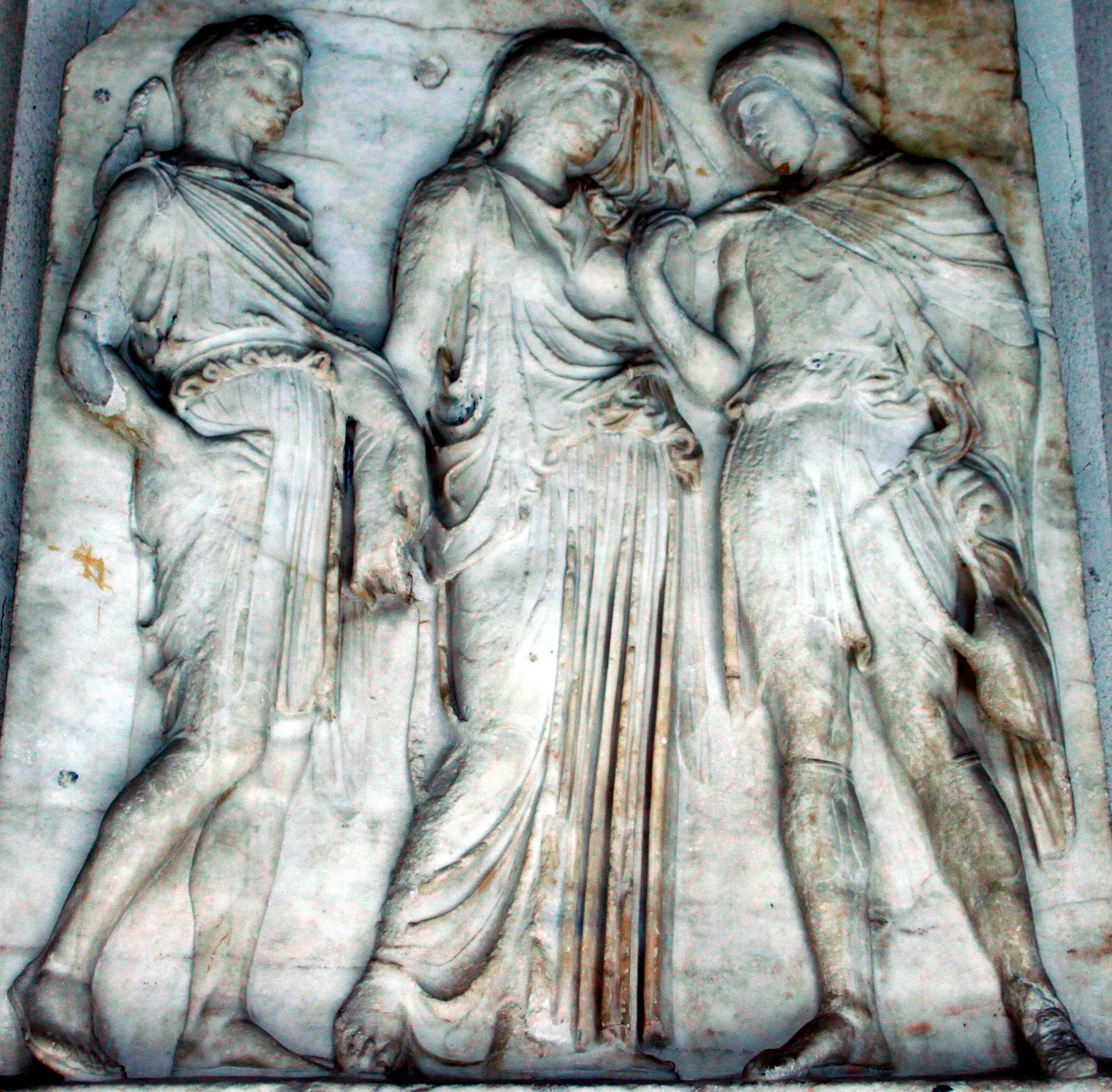
Hermes, Euridice, Orpheus; 40 BC Roman copy of the Greek original of 5th c. BC (Naples museum). Sculptor from the school of Phidias, perhaps Alkamenes

Tracing the history of Torre del Greco is difficult given the almost complete lack of historical documentary sources. Based on archaeological evidence, in Roman times Torre del Greco was probably a suburb of Herculaneum and, like elsewhere on the Bay of Naples such as at Oplontis and Stabiae, many patricians' villas would have lined the coast. In 79 AD the eruption of Vesuvius buried the area under volcanic ash.

The nearby Roman Villa Sora was a large and sumptuous residence with terraces down to the beach and overlooking the sea from its 150m-long frontage, dating from the 1st c. BC, whose excavated remains can be seen today. It was built on multiple levels like the Villa of the Papyri and on the beach below are the remains of a Roman bath complex (Terme Ginnasi) and quays would have been on the shore. It was embellished in the early imperial period and was being renovated in 79 AD, probably after the 62 AD earthquake as shown by the piles of lime in some rooms, unfinished precious opus sectile floors made of imported marble and a famous graffito which recorded the cost of the work.

Many exquisite statues and frescos were found here firstly in the Bourbon excavations of the 1700s which are now in the museums such as Naples and the Palermo. Its size and quality imply it belonged to an important figure, possibly of the Imperial family judging by the spectacular frescoes which during the excavations of 1989 the area inspector considered closer to the Neronian Domus Aurea than to Pompeian houses.

It was rediscovered in 1974 by the GAV Archaeological Group. Further excavations in 1989–92 exposed the areas east and west of the apsidal hall, including service corridors, reception rooms, finely decorated bedrooms and the remains visible today. It was found that the top floor collapsed following the eruption while the bottom floor was buried by the ash. The middle floor can be visited today.

Recent excavations uncovered a room with walls of black and red backgrounds with paintings of herons and candelabra. The ceiling was painted with mythological figures including griffins and a centaur.

The remains of another maritime villa nearby at Terma-Ginnasio have been found which was terraced down to the shore and also had panoramic views of the Bay, similar to Villa A at Oplontis.

The so-called Villa Breglia was another maritime villa lying under the railway station and was partially excavated in 1934.

=== Post-Roman period ===
Later two villages are known to have been established in the area, Sora and Calastro. The Byzantine general Belisarius moved their inhabitants to Naples in 535. Around 700, it was also known as Turris Octava, the Latin for The Tower of Eight [sides] or The Eighth Tower, probably referring to a coastal watch tower. The current name appears for the first time in 1015; according to tradition, it stems from a Greek hermit who took up residence in the tower, or from the cultivation of a particular vine from Greece.

=== Middle Ages ===
Torre del Greco was part of the royal estates of the Kingdom of Naples, until King Alfonso V of Aragon ceded it to the Carafa family.

In 1631 Torre del Greco was again damaged by an eruption of Vesuvius. Its citizens bought back their rights in 1699, after paying 106,000 ducats to their landlord, the Marquis of Monforte, and thenceforth the city flourished as a maritime trading and fishing port. The tradition of coral crafting dates from this time.

The historical centre of Torre del Greco was buried under a 10-metre-deep (33-foot) layer of lava in 1794.

=== 19th and early 20th century ===
At the time of the French rule of Joachim Murat, Torre del Greco, with 18,000 inhabitants, was the third largest mainland city in the Kingdom of Naples after Naples and Foggia.

Starting in the 16th century, wealthy families and even Italian nobility built elaborate summer palaces on the outskirts of the town. Among the most notable of these is the Palazzo Materazzo, renovated in the 1970s as a dance school, but later taken over by squatters after the 1980 Irpinia earthquake destroyed the homes of many of the poorer residents. In the 19th century, and continuing into the early 20th century, Torre del Greco was a popular summer resort for wealthy Italians.

In its heyday Torre del Greco was renowned for its cafés and eateries, particularly the "Gran Caffè Palumbo", a large Art Nouveau café with an extensive outdoor pavilion known for its gelato, pastries, food and coffee. The comedian Totò was among those who made Torre del Greco their annual summer retreat. The reason for Torre del Greco's popularity as a resort town was its fine beaches and the rural setting of lush farmlands and vineyards, as well as its close proximity to Vesuvius. As the town nearest to the volcano, Torre del Greco was the main starting point for tourists wishing to scale the mountain. This was facilitated by the Vesuvius Funicular, which took tourists to the crater from the town.

During World War II, the city was used as an ammunition depot by the German army, and consequently suffered heavy bombing by Allied forces.

== Geography ==
=== Climate ===
Torre del Greco experiences a Mediterranean climate (Köppen climate classification Csa).

Climate data for Torre del Greco
Month	Jan	Feb	Mar	Apr	May	Jun	Jul	Aug	Sep	Oct	Nov	Dec	Year
Mean daily maximum °C (°F)	12.5 (54.5)	13.2 (55.8)	15.2 (59.4)	18.2 (64.8)	22.6 (72.7)	26.2 (79.2)	29.3 (84.7)	29.5 (85.1)	26.3 (79.3)	21.8 (71.2)	17.0 (62.6)	13.6 (56.5)	20.4 (68.8)
Mean daily minimum °C (°F)	3.8 (38.8)	4.3 (39.7)	5.9 (42.6)	8.3 (46.9)	12.1 (53.8)	15.6 (60.1)	18.0 (64.4)	17.9 (64.2)	15.3 (59.5)	11.6 (52.9)	7.7 (45.9)	5.1 (41.2)	10.4 (50.8)
Average precipitation mm (inches)	100 (4.1)	99 (3.9)	86 (3.4)	76 (3.0)	51 (2.0)	33 (1.3)	25 (1.0)	41 (1.6)	81 (3.2)	130 (5.1)	160 (6.4)	120 (4.8)	1,010 (39.8)

== Demographics ==
Historical population
Year	Pop.	±%
1861	9,324	—
1871	24,338	+161.0%
1881	28,201	+15.9%
1901	35,328	+25.3%
1911	39,523	+11.9%
1921	45,693	+15.6%
1931	50,118	+9.7%
1936	51,401	+2.6%
1951	64,395	+25.3%
1961	77,576	+20.5%
1971	91,676	+18.2%
1981	103,605	+13.0%
1991	101,361	−2.2%
2001	90,607	−10.6%
2011	85,922	−5.2%
2021	81,289	−5.4%
Source: ISTAT

As of 2026, the population is 78,839, of which 48.2% are male, and 51.8% are female. Minors make up 16.7% of the population, and seniors make up 23.2%.

=== Immigration ===
As of 2025, immigrants make up 1.8% of the population, the lowest percentage among all municipalities of Italy with a population over 50,000. The 5 largest foreign countries of birth are Ukraine, Germany, Brazil, Bulgaria, and Romania.

== Economy ==
The city is the headquarters of Banca di Credito Popolare di Torre del Greco.

== Main sights ==
- Roman archaeological remains, including the so-called Villa Sora (1st century AD), probably a property of the Flavians.
- The monastery of the Zoccolanti, with a cloister housing 28 frescoed panels depicting the life of Saint Francis of Assisi.
- The parish church of Santa Croce, whose baroque belltower was buried by lava in 1794.
- The 17th-century church of San Michele.
- Villa delle Ginestre, where the poet Giacomo Leopardi sojourned.
- The Museum of Coral.
- Chiarina al Mare historic restaurant, now San Pietro Bistrot and MM Lounge

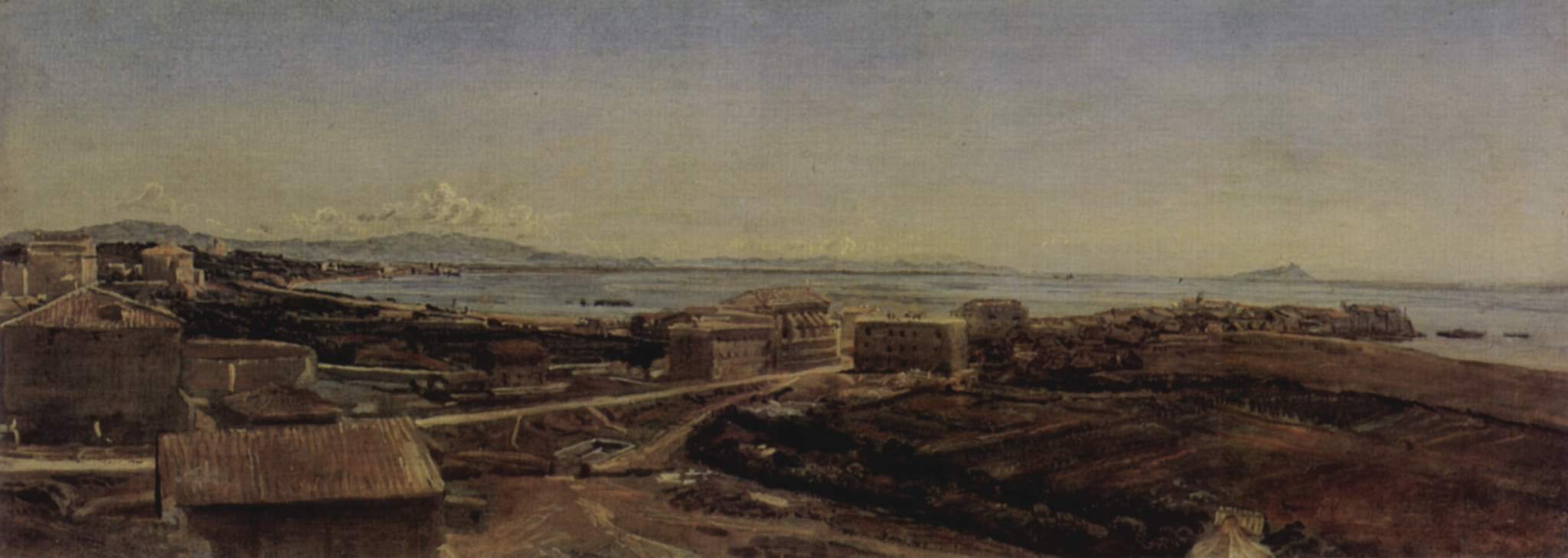
Torre del Greco near Pompeii, Alexander Andreyevich Ivanov, 1846.

== Cameos and coral jewellery ==
Diving for coral has taken place in the Mediterranean Sea ever since Roman times, and in the 15th century Torre del Greco became known for its coral diving and harvesting of red coral. However, it was not until the 17th century that the first cameos were produced, and not until 1815 that a unique manufacturing contract was granted to the town by the King of Naples for a period of ten years.

At present there are several hundred companies and several thousands of people employed in the manufacture of coral and shell cameos. Coral is now mainly imported from Asia, since areas in the Mediterranean are increasingly becoming protected. The total industry is estimated to have a turnover of around US$225 million.

== Notable people ==
- Salvatore Accardo, violinist and conductor
- Vincenzo Romano, Catholic priest and canonized Saint
- Francesco Albanese, tenor
- Ruggero Bonghi, philologist and politician
- Rita Bottiglieri, ex pentathlete
- Ruggero Cappuccio, author and director
- Vincenzo Ciaravolo, sailor, recipient of the Gold Medal of Military Valor
- Salvatore Commesso, cyclist
- Ermanno Corsi, journalist and writer
- Ettore Capriolo, Italian translator of Salman Rushdie's The Satanic Verses
- Gino D'Acampo, chef
- Nicolas De Corsi, painter
- Giovanni Di Cristo, Italy national team judoka
- Enrico de Nicola, first President of Italy
- Maria Di Donna, singer of the 99 Posse
- Mauro Esposito, footballer for A.S. Roma and the Italy national football team
- Aniello Formisano, Italian senator
- Nicola Lagnena, footballer
- Mimmo Liguoro, journalist
- Ernesto Mahieux, actor
- Adolfo Margiotta, comedian
- Carlo Parlati, sculptor
- Valeria Parrella, writer
- Tobia Polese, painter
- Massimo Rastelli, footballer
- Arturo Scotto, member of the Italian Parliament
- Gioacchino Vitelli, painter
- Francesco Vitiello, actor
- Gennaro Vitiello, director and stage actor
- Nicola Antonio Zingarelli, composer
- Dario Nardella, mayor of Florence

== Twin towns - sister cities ==
Torre del Greco is twinned with:

- Montesarchio (Italy)
