= Timeline of Bologna =

Coordinates: 44.5075°N 11.351389°E

The following is a timeline of the history of the city of Bologna, Emilia-Romagna region, Italy.

== Prior to 18th century ==
- at least 1000 BCE – First settlement.
- 9th C. BCE – Etruscan settlement.
- end of the 5th century BCE – Celtic settlement.
- 189 BCE – Town becomes a Roman colony.
- 3rd C. CE – Catholic diocese of Bologna established.
- 6th C. CE – Byzantines in power.
- 9th C. CE – Benedictine monastery active in Santo Stefano.
- 902 – Town sacked by Hungarian forces.
- 1088 – University established.
- 1109 – Torre Asinelli (tower) built.
- 1110 – Torre Garisenda (tower) built.
- 1112 – Bologna becomes a free town.
- 1167 – City joins Lombard League.
- 1184 – Bologna Cathedral consecrated by Pope Lucius III.
- 1200 – Palazzo del Podestà built (approximate date).
- 1206 – Inner city fortifications.
- 1245 – Palatium Novum & Palazzo d'Accursio built.
- 1249 – Enzio of Sardinia imprisoned in the Palatium Novum.
- 1252 – Basilica of San Domenico dedicated.
- 1263 – Church of San Francesco built.
- 1293 – Paper mill established.
- 1337 – Taddeo de Pepoli in power.
- 1348 – Black Death epidemic.
- 1351 – Giovanni Visconti of Milan in power.
- 1356 – Public clock installed.
- 1364 – Collegio di Spagna founded.
- 1390 – San Petronio Basilica construction begins.
- 1401 – Giovanni Bentivoglio in power.
- 1436 – Cappella musicale di San Petronio founded.
- 1438 – Bentivoglio family in power again.
- 1444 – Clock tower built in the Palazzo Comunale.
- 1471 – Printing press in operation.
- 1477 – Ptolemy's illustrated Geography published.
- 1506 – Bologna annexed to the Papal States from the Bentivoglio family.
- 1511 – French in power.
- 1530 – Coronation of Charles V, Holy Roman Emperor.
- 1563 – Archiginnasio built.
- 1567 – Fountain of Neptune installed.
- 1568 – Orto Botanico (garden) established.
- 1582
  - Roman Catholic Archdiocese of Bologna established.
  - Accademia dei Carracci (art school) founded.
- 1603 – Palazzo Caprara built.
- 1615 – Accademia dei Floridi founded.
- 1642 – The gazette named Bologna was published for the first time
- 1651 – Teatro Malvezzi built.
- 1653 – Marcello Malpighi, biologist and physician, granted doctorates at University of Bologna.
- 1666 – Accademia Filarmonica di Bologna founded.
- 1675 – Birth of Prospero Lambertini, later Pope Benedict XIV.

== 18th–19th centuries ==
- 1712 – Painting academy founded.
- 1714
  - Academy of Sciences of the Institute of Bologna established.
  - Observatory built.
- 1737 – Birth of Luigi Galvani a pioneer of bioelectromagnetics.
- 1763 – Teatro Comunale built.
- 1789 – Galvani conducts bioelectricity experiments.
- 1796 – City becomes part of the French Cisalpine Republic.
- 1797 – 3rd Battalion of the Polish Legions founded in Bologna.
- 1801 – Biblioteca Comunale (library) opens.
- 1805 – Teatro del Corso opens.
- 1814
  - City occupied by Austrians.
  - Teatro Contavalli established.
- 1831 – 4 February: "Insurrection."
- 1833 – Young Italy Party unrest.
- 1859 – June: "Insurrection."
- 1860
  - Bologna becomes part of the Kingdom of Italy.
  - Gazzetta dell'Emilia newspaper begins publication.
- 1871 – Population: 115,957.
- 1874 – Archivio di Stato di Bologna (state archives) established.
- 1897 – Population: 153,206.
- 1899 – Avanti savoia! newspaper begins publication.

== 20th century ==
- 1901 – Population: 102,122 town; 153,501 commune.
- 1909
  - 5 February: Marinetti's Manifesto of Futurism published in Gazzetta dell'Emilia.
  - Bologna F. C. 1909 football club founded.
- 1914 – Maserati automaker in business.
- 1926 – Cinema Teatro Medica Palace opens.
- 1933 – 19 January: Honorary Consulate of Poland opened (see Italy–Poland relations).
- 1944 – Aerial bombing.
- 1945 – April: Battle of Bologna; Allied forces take city.
- 1950 – Population: 226,771.
- 1963 – Cineteca di Bologna founded.
- 1974 – Istituto per i beni artistici, culturali e naturali della Regione Emilia-Romagna headquartered in Bologna.
- 1977 – 1977 Bologna events (student protest).
- 1980 – 2 August: Train station bombing.
- 1985 – Museo civico medievale opens.
- 1990 – Part of 1990 FIFA World Cup football contest held in Bologna.

== 21st century ==
- 2002 – Associazione Home Movies film archive founded.
- 2003 – Sister city relationship established with Portland, Oregon, USA.
- 2011 – Virginio Merola becomes mayor.
- 2013 – Population: 380,635.
- 2016 – May: Bologna municipal election, 2016 held.
- 2020 – Marconi Express opens.
- 2022 – July: City hosts the final round of the 2022 FIVB Volleyball Men's Nations League.

== See also ==
- Bologna history
- History of Bologna with timeline (in Italian)
- List of mayors of Bologna

Timelines of other cities in the macroregion of Northeast Italy:^{(it)}

- Emilia-Romagna region: Timeline of Ferrara; Forlì; Modena; Parma; Piacenza; Ravenna; Reggio Emilia; Rimini
- Friuli-Venezia Giulia region: Timeline of Trieste
- Trentino-South Tyrol region: Timeline of Bolzano; Trento
- Veneto region: Timeline of Padua; Treviso; Venice; Verona; Vicenza

== Bibliography ==
=== in English ===
- Frederic Leopold Stolberg (1796), "(Bologna)", Travels through Germany, Switzerland, Italy, and Sicily, translated by Thomas Holcroft, London: G.G. and J. Robinson
- Abraham Rees (1819), "Bologna", The Cyclopaedia, London: Longman, Hurst, Rees, Orme & Brown
- Josiah Conder (1834), "Bologna", Italy, The Modern Traveller, vol. 32, London: J.Duncan
- J. Willoughby Rosse (1858). "Bologna". Index of Dates ... Facts in the Chronology and History of the World. London: H.G. Bohn. hdl:2027/uva.x030807786 – via HathiTrust.
- George Henry Townsend (1867), "Bologna", A Manual of Dates (2nd ed.), London: Frederick Warne & Co.
- William Smith, ed. (1872) [1854]. "Bononia". Dictionary of Greek and Roman Geography. London: John Murray. hdl:2027/hvd.ah5cuq.
- "Bologna", Hand-book for Travellers in Northern Italy (16th ed.), London: John Murray, 1897, OCLC 2231483
- T. Francis Bumpus (1900), "Ferrara and Bologna", Cathedrals and Churches of Northern Italy, London: Laurie
- Ashby, Thomas (1910). "Bologna" . Encyclopædia Britannica. Vol. 4 (11th ed.). pp. 178–179.
- "Bologna", Northern Italy (14th ed.), Leipzig: Karl Baedeker, 1913
- Umberto Benigni (1913). "Bologna". Catholic Encyclopedia. New York.
- Grieco, Romy. Bologna: a city to discover(1976).
- Trudy Ring, ed. (1996). "Bologna". Southern Europe. International Dictionary of Historic Places. Vol. 3. Fitzroy Dearborn. p. 96+. ISBN 9781134259656. OCLC 31045650.
- Victor Crowther (1999). The Oratorio in Bologna 1650-1730. Clarendon Press. ISBN 978-0-19-158441-1.
- Shona Kelly Wray (2009). Communities and Crisis: Bologna During the Black Death. Brill. ISBN 978-90-04-17634-8.
- Colum Hourihane, ed. (2012). "Bologna". Grove Encyclopedia of Medieval Art and Architecture. Oxford University Press. ISBN 978-0-19-539536-5.

=== in other languages ===
- Guida per la città di Bologna (in Italian). Bologna: Tipografia de S. Tommaso d' Aquino. 1844.
- Giuseppe Ottino (1875), "Elenco dei periodici italiani per ordine di provincie: Bologna", La stampa periodica, il commercio dei libri e la tipografia in Italia (in Italian), Milan: G. Brigola, hdl:2027/umn.31951001486193y. (List of newspapers in Bologna)
- Nicola Bernardini, ed. (1890). "Provincia di Bologna". Guida della stampa periodica italiana (in Italian). Lecce: R. Tipografia editrice salentina dei fratelli Spacciante. hdl:2027/njp.32101074983378.
- "Bologna", Ober-Italien [Northern Italy], Meyers Reisebücher (in German), Leipzig: Bibliographisches Institut, 1892, hdl:2027/njp.32101063572216
- Nuova guida di Bologna (in Italian). 1921.
- Brunella Dalla Casa and Alberto Preti, eds. Bologna in guerra, 1940-1945 (Milan: Angeli, 1995)
- Gastone Mazzanti. Obiettivo Bologna (Bologna: Costa, 2006 – 1st ed. 2001). (About World War II)
- G. Sassatelli, A. Donati, Storia di Bologna, Vol. 1 - Bologna nell'antichità, Bologna, Bononia University Press, 2005, ISBN 978-88-7395-109-4.
- O. Capitani, Storia di Bologna, Vol. 2 - Bologna nel Medioevo, Bologna, Bononia University Press, 2007, ISBN 978-88-7395-208-4.
- A. Prosperi, Storia di Bologna, Vol. 3 - Bologna nell'età moderna. Cultura, istituzioni culturali, Chiesa e vita religiosa, Bologna, Bononia University Press, 2009, ISBN 978-88-7395-394-4.
- A. Berselli, A. Varni, Storia di Bologna, Vol. 4 - Bologna in età contemporanea. 1796–1914, Bologna, Bononia University Press, 2010, ISBN 978-88-7395-571-9.
