= San Giuseppe Sposo, Bologna =

Roman Catholic church in Bologna, Italy

Coordinates: 44°29′21.8″N 11°19′32.9″E

San Giuseppe Sposo is a medieval Roman Catholic church and convent, now respectively parish church and museum, near Porta Saragozza in Bologna, Italy.

== History ==
Originally the site was part of an Augustinian order Cluniac monastery originating in 1254; the church was then dedicated to Santa Maria Maddalena in Valdipietra. The monastery later passed on to nuns, and later the Dominican order. In 1566, it housed the Servi di Maria, who named the church San Giuseppe. In 1810, the convent was suppressed. However, after Napoleon's defeat, in 1818, the Capuchin order, with 11 priests and 16 lay brothers, were granted the church and monastery. In 1865–1866, the Kingdom of Italy expropriated the site for military uses. In 1873, the church was reconsecrated, and the monastery reused in 1892. In 1926, in celebration of the 700th anniversary of St Francis, the field adjacent to the Piazza of the church was converted into a public garden, and a bronze statue of the Saint by Mario Sarto was erected. The convent suffered grievously during the Second World War, including the destruction of its once large library. In 1943, the church was named a sanctuary, and in 1959, made a parish church.

== Museum ==
A museum, founded in 1928 by father Leonardo Montalti of Mercato Saraceno, is now hosted in the convent of the Frati Minori Cappuccini just outside Porta Saragozza. It collects works of art from various Capuchin order convents of the Emilia-Romagna region, including Ferrara, Porretta, Castel San Pietro, Imola, and Lugo. In the 1970s, the architect Leone Pancaldi rearranged the exhibition space, giving special prominence to the Crucifix by Marco Zoppo, by creating an apse for exhibition. Other major works are a Madonna of the Rose by Pietro Lianori; a Coronation of the Virgin by Jacopo di Paolo; an Adoration by the Magi by Flaminio Torri; a Crucifixion by the Passerotti brothers; a St Francis in Ecstasy by Bartolomeo Cesi; a Deposition of Christ by Gaetano Gandolfi; and two ovals with St Peter and Paul by Giuseppe Maria Crespi. The museum also has works of ivory and a large terracotta Madonna and child (1523), called Sedes Sapientiae by Zaccaria Zacchi; two wooden tabernacles from Lugo, one of them signed by Cesare Fabbri (1706); and some terracota nativity scenes, one by Rossetti.

Other artists in the museum are Innocenzo da Imola, Lavinia Fontana, Dionigi Calvaert, Ubaldo Gandolfi, Luigi Crespi, Ercole Graziani the Younger, Piancastelli and Majani.
