= Palazzo dei Banchi =

Building in Bologna, Italy

Coordinates: 44°29′37″N 11°20′38″E

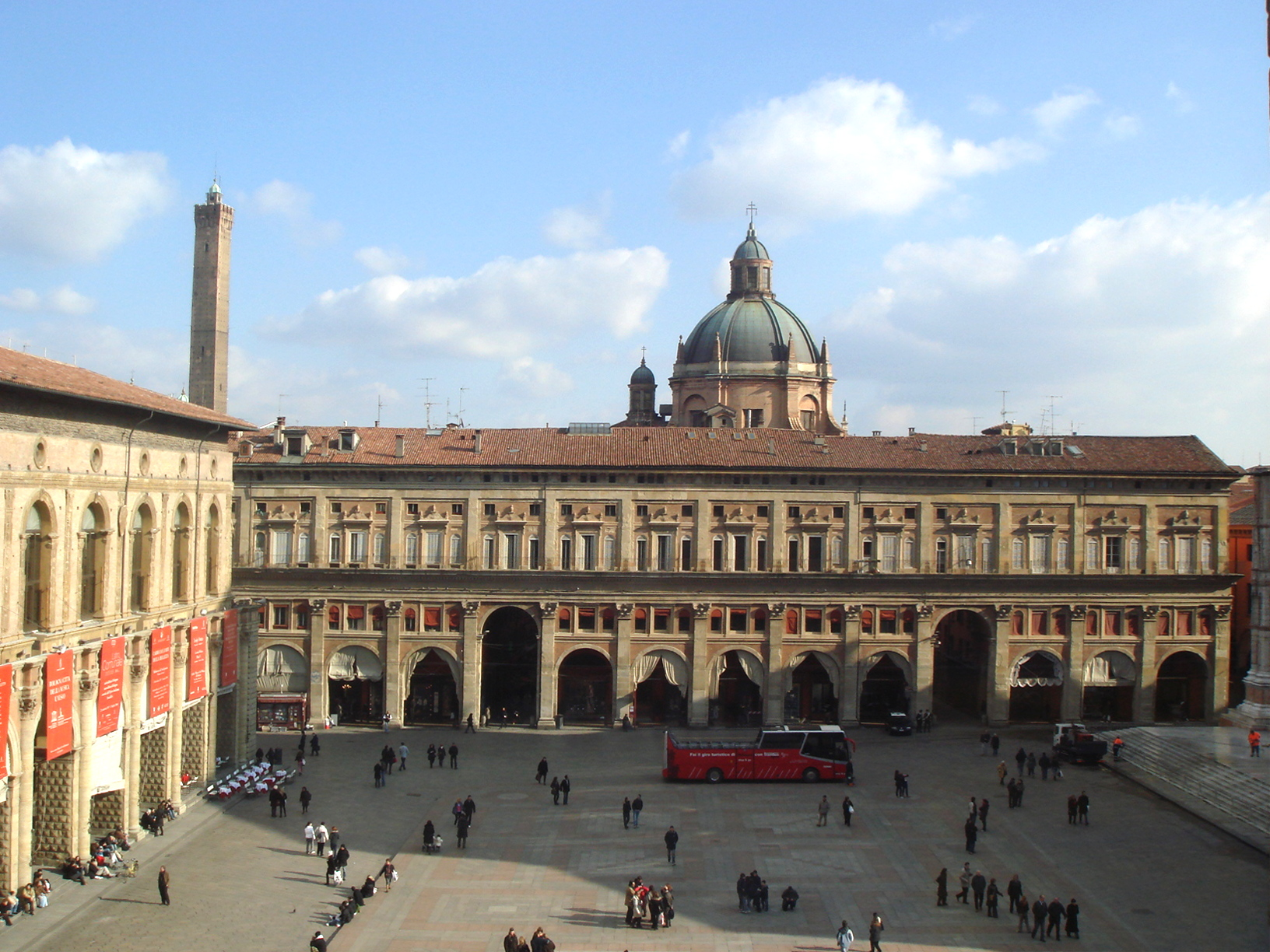
Palazzo dei Banchi

Palazzo dei Banchi is a Renaissance-style palace façade located on the eastern flank of the Piazza Maggiore in the center of Bologna, region of Emilia-Romagna, Italy.

In the 16th century when the present façade was constructed, and still, the Piazza Maggiore was the main public plaza of Bologna, surrounded by the centers of religious and political governance, represented by the cathedral (Basilica of San Petronio) and the palaces of Re Enzo (Pretorian palace) and D'Accursio (city hall). Prior to the 16th century, this end of the Piazza was represented by a jumble of house and store-fronts. In 1412, the Piazza front was roofed with a portico. Amid the houses emerged small alleys: Via Pescherie Vecchie, Via Clavature, and Via degli Orefici, each with their own concentration of businesses. Underneath the porticos adjacent to the Piazza, bankers set up banchi (money changers/loans) to conduct their business. In the 15th and 16th centuries, among the families owning botteghe were the aristocratic and senatorial Malvasia, Duglioli, and Amorini families.

In 1565–1568, the commune and merchants wishing to create a pleasing architectural component to this site, commissioned from the architect Vignola, the present design. The asymmetric façade has 15 rounded arches, two of which are larger and lead to the alleys mentioned above, while the others are lower. All are flanked by monumental Composite pilasters. Each floor has its own Mannerist rhythm of window placement, unifying the complex into what appears to be a single gallery of one palace.

The palace is connected by a portico, known as a Pavaglione, to the Archiginnasio of Bologna, one of the main buildings of the University of Bologna. The term derives from the local dialect "Pavajån", meaning "pavilion", in reference to a fair of silkworms held here in 1449.

To this day, behind the palace on some days there’s an open-air market of local products. The palace itself is occupied by a combination of businesses and apartments. Also located behind the palace structure is the city's archeology museum and the church of Santa Maria della Vita.
