= Palazzo del Podestà, Bologna =

Civic building in Bologna, Italy

Coordinates: 44°29′38.93″N 11°20′34.73″E

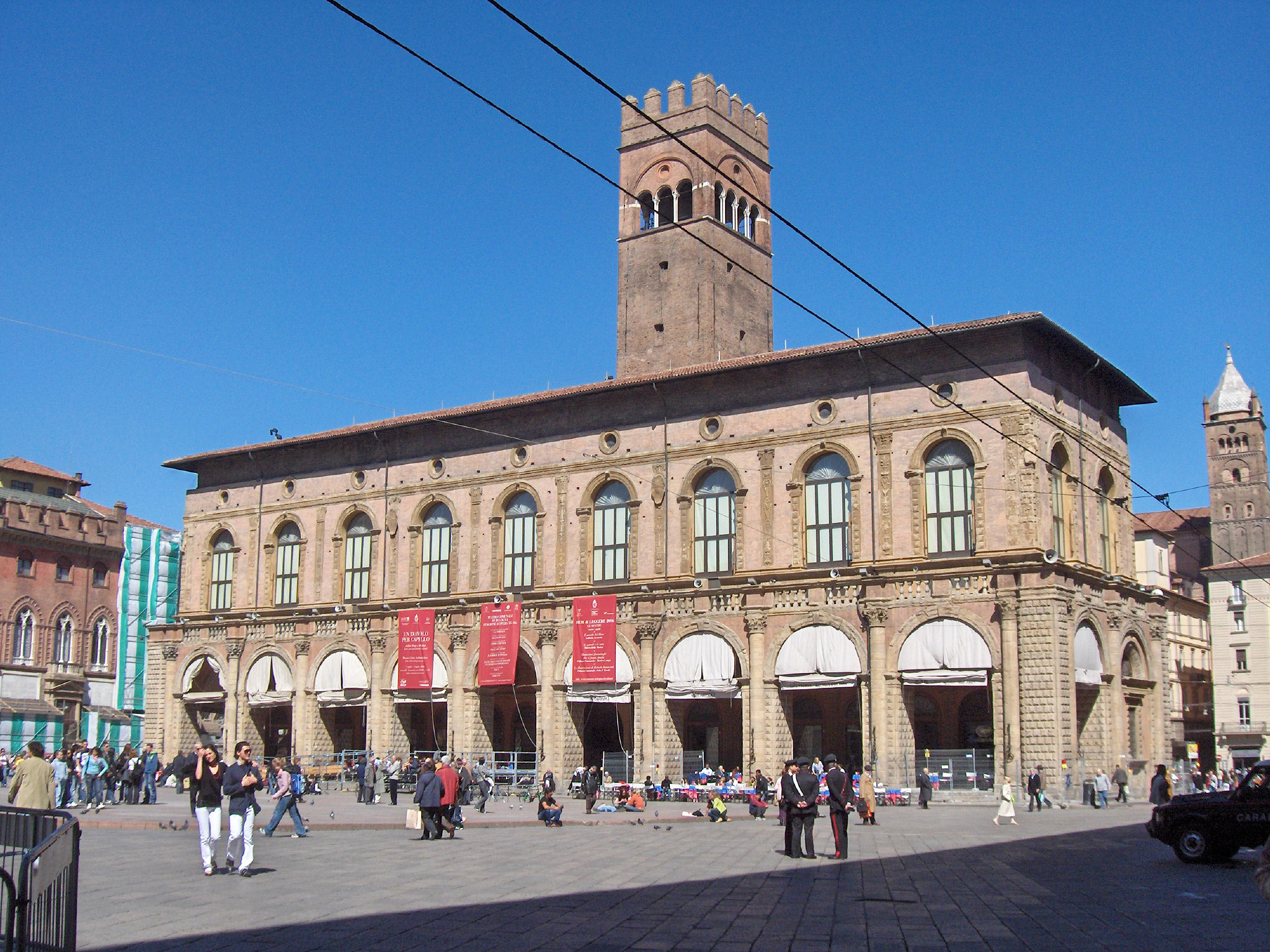
Palazzo del Podestà.

The Palazzo del Podestà is a civic building in Bologna, northern Italy.

The edifice was built around 1200 as the seat of the local podestà, the various functionaries of the commune. It stands on the Piazza Maggiore, near the Palazzo Comunale and facing the Basilica of San Petronio. Proving insufficient for the massive participation of the people in the city's government, it was in 1245 flanked by the Palazzo Re Enzo, over which stands the Torre dell'Arengo, whose bell was used to call the people during emergencies.

The Palazzo del Podestà is a long building, with a large hall on the upper floor. The lower floor is a double open arcade, the so-called Voltone del Podestà, through which pass two lanes of shops.

In 1453, Aristotile Fioravanti replaced the bell and reconstructed the original Gothic façade in the Renaissance style by order of Giovanni II Bentivoglio. In the Voltone, in 1525, were placed the terracotta statues of the city's protectors, Sts. Petronius, Proculus, Dominic and Francis, all by Alfonso Lombardi.

In the 16th–18th centuries, the Palazzo was used as a theatre. In the 20th century, it was frescoed by Adolfo de Carolis.
