= Palazzo della Compagnia dell'Arte dei Brentatori, Bologna =

Medieval palace and hotel in Bologna, Italy

Coordinates: 44.4926°N 11.3425°E

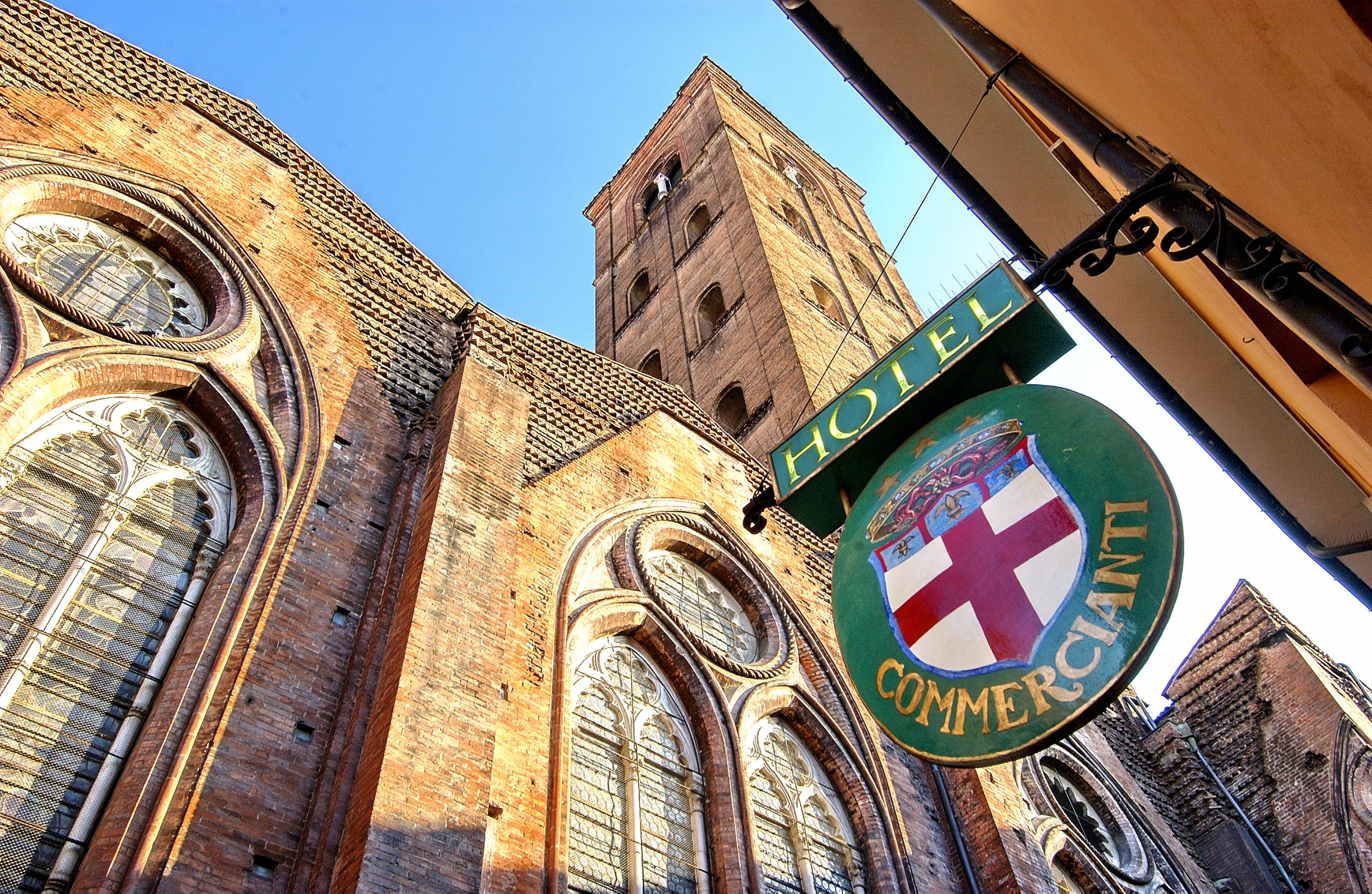
Hotel Commercianti in Bologna

The Palazzo della Compagnia dell'Arte dei Brentatori is a medieval palace located on Via de' Pignattari #11, starting at the Piazza Maggiore and running alongside the basilica church of San Petronio. It presently functions as the Hotel Commercianti, and a hotel at the site has existed for over a century.

== History ==
The first references to the building at the site date from 1116, when they were chosen as the first offices of the city. The citizens chose the ancient Roman structure of the Curia of Sancti Ambrosii, together with this palace. The town assemblies often took place at the corner of Vicolo Colombina.

In the mid 12th century, the city offices moved at first near the Archiginnasio and, later in the 13th century, they occupied the Palazzo Civico, built for this purpose in Piazza Maggiore.

No longer seat of the Comune, the building was acquired by two of Bologna's most celebrated Glossatori or legal scholars of Bologna: Alberico di Porta Ravegnana, who made it the seat of his Society of the Arts, and Odofredo, who used the place for housing and teaching.

The end of the 14th century, construction of the Basilica di San Petronio, began. To make room, the Curia of Sancti Ambrosii was demolished. Destruction of this structure was blocked when the size of the San Petronio church was scaled down.

Traces of the medieval structure remain, including a well. The interiors contain frescoes made with the “pounce” technique, depicting the heraldic achievements of ancient families from Bologna.

Inns were found in this section, as touted in a 1712 etching titled “Giuoco nuovo di tutte l'osterie che sono in Bologna" (“Novel game of all the inns in Bologna”) by Giuseppe Maria Mitelli. The twelfth box depicts the banner of the Garden of via De' Pignattari, then called “della Pellegrina”. This name was recently found in a lease drawn up in 1760 by the lay abbot of the Magione di Santa Maria del Tempio.

== Brentatori ==
From about 1250, this building was the home of the Compagnia dell'Arte dei Brentatori, the medieval craft-guild of wine barrel merchants. The company was also employed as fire-fighters. They were recruited because of the “brenta”, the barrels that could be filled with water to extinguish fires.
