= Michele di Matteo da Bologna =

Italian painter

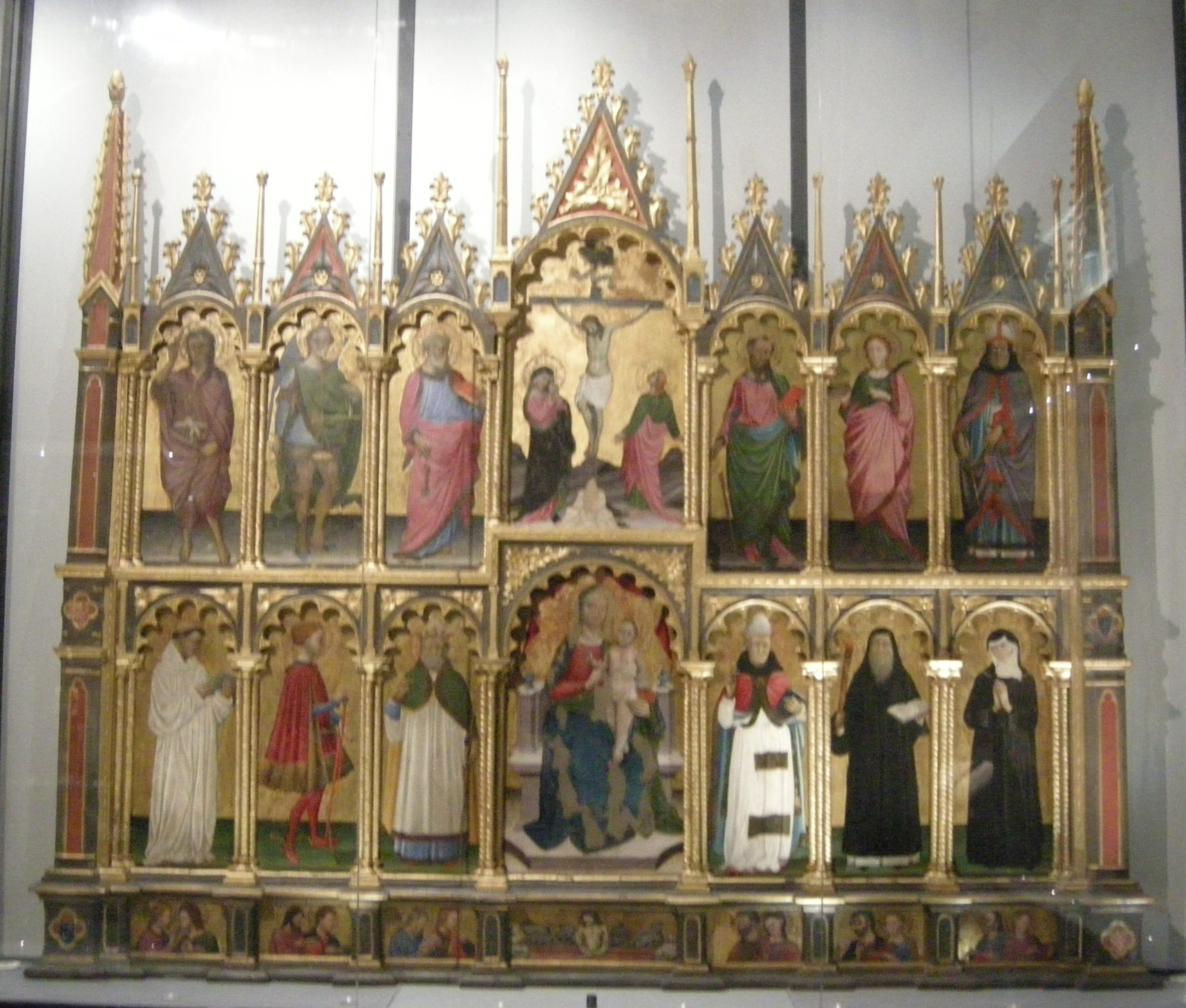
Michele di Matteo Lambertini, Altarpiece, (early fifteenth century). Diocesan Museum Nonantola

Michele di Matteo, also sometimes used with further qualifications of da Bologna or Lambertini (active 1410- 1448 or 1469) was an Italian painter of the late Gothic period in Bologna.

== Biography ==
In 1410, he labored with Francesco Lola in painting processional standards for the city's reception of the Antipope Alexander V. He painted frescoes and designed windows for the Basilica San Petronio and the church of San Giacomo of Bologna.

In 1447, he painted in the church of San Giovanni at Siena the twelve articles of the Apostles Creed. He also painted a Pietà between Saints John, Mark, Roch, and Anthony Abbot (1462) and a Virgin and Child, (1469) found in the Academy of Bologna. The Gallerie dell'Accademia of Venice has an altar-piece of the Virgin and Child with Saints and scenes from the life of St Helena.

In 1428, he worked in Bologna with Giovanni da Modena. A polyptych depicting the Virgin Mary and St John the Evangelist and other Saints (1430-1437) by Michele is present at the Museum of Art of the University of Missouri in Columbia. It was painted for the church of Sant'Elena, Venice. He is also attributed a painted crucifix at the Pinacoteca Nazionale of Bologna. It is not clear how this painting relates to the painting Bryan talks about at the Accademia.

The early 20th century art historians Crowe and Cavalcaselle generally dismiss the power of Michele, describing his works in the galleries of Bologna and Venice as ugly, injured and defective. Some assert he differs from Michele di Matteo da Bergamo.
