= Palazzo dei Notai =

Historic building in Bologna, Italy

Coordinates: 44°29′36.5″N 11°20′33″E

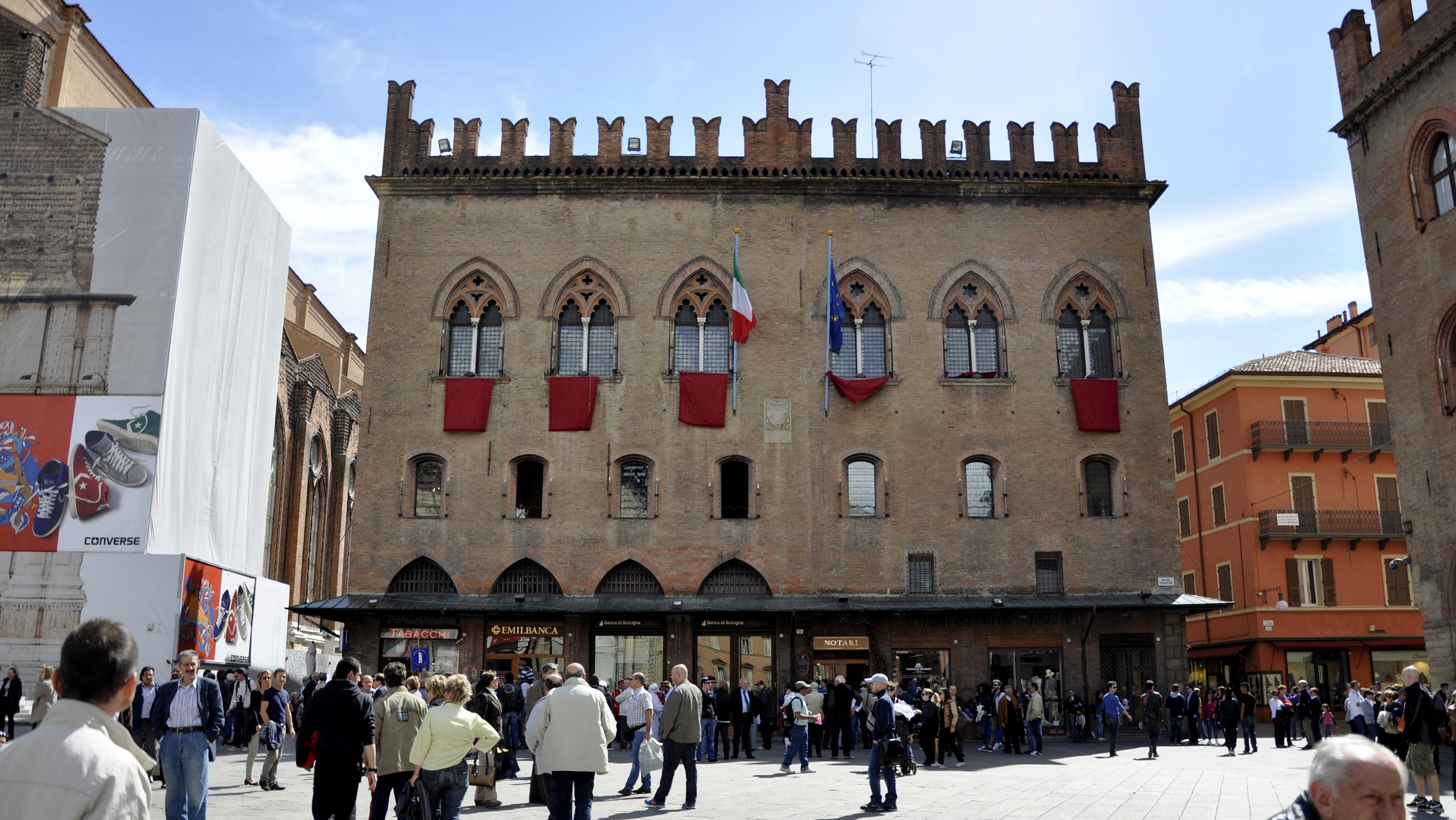
Palazzo dei Notai facing piazza Maggiore

Palazzo dei Notai is a historic building in Bologna, Italy. It faces Piazza Maggiore, between the basilica di San Petronio and palazzo d'Accursio. It was built in 1381 by the city's notaries guild as their seat, under design by Berto Cavalletto and Lorenzo da Bagnomarino.

Another section facing Palazzo d'Accursio was remade by Bartolomeo Fioravanti around 1437. It was again restored in 1908 by Alfonso Rubbiani.

It consists of a brick rectangular building, crenellated on the top, with ground story awnings.

The interior has 15th-century frescoes.
