= Illustratore =

Italian painter

The Illustratore was an Italian illuminator active between 1330 and 1347. Almost nothing is known about him. Due to similarities between the two, his output was first designated as separate from that of Niccolò da Bologna; indeed, Erbach von Fürstenau at first called him the Pseudo-Niccolò, so close was the resemblance between their works. The name "Illustratore" has since been accepted instead; his identity, however, remains unknown, although various hypotheses (including Andrea da Bologna) have been put forth, with varying degrees of success.

He is known to have worked on at least one manuscript with the Master of 1328.

The Grove Encyclopedia of Medieval Art and Architecture observed that no work by the Illustratore is known after the Black Death of 1348.
