= Piazza Maggiore =

Square in Bologna, Emilia-Romagna, Italy

Coordinates: 44°29′37.77″N 11°20′33.83″E

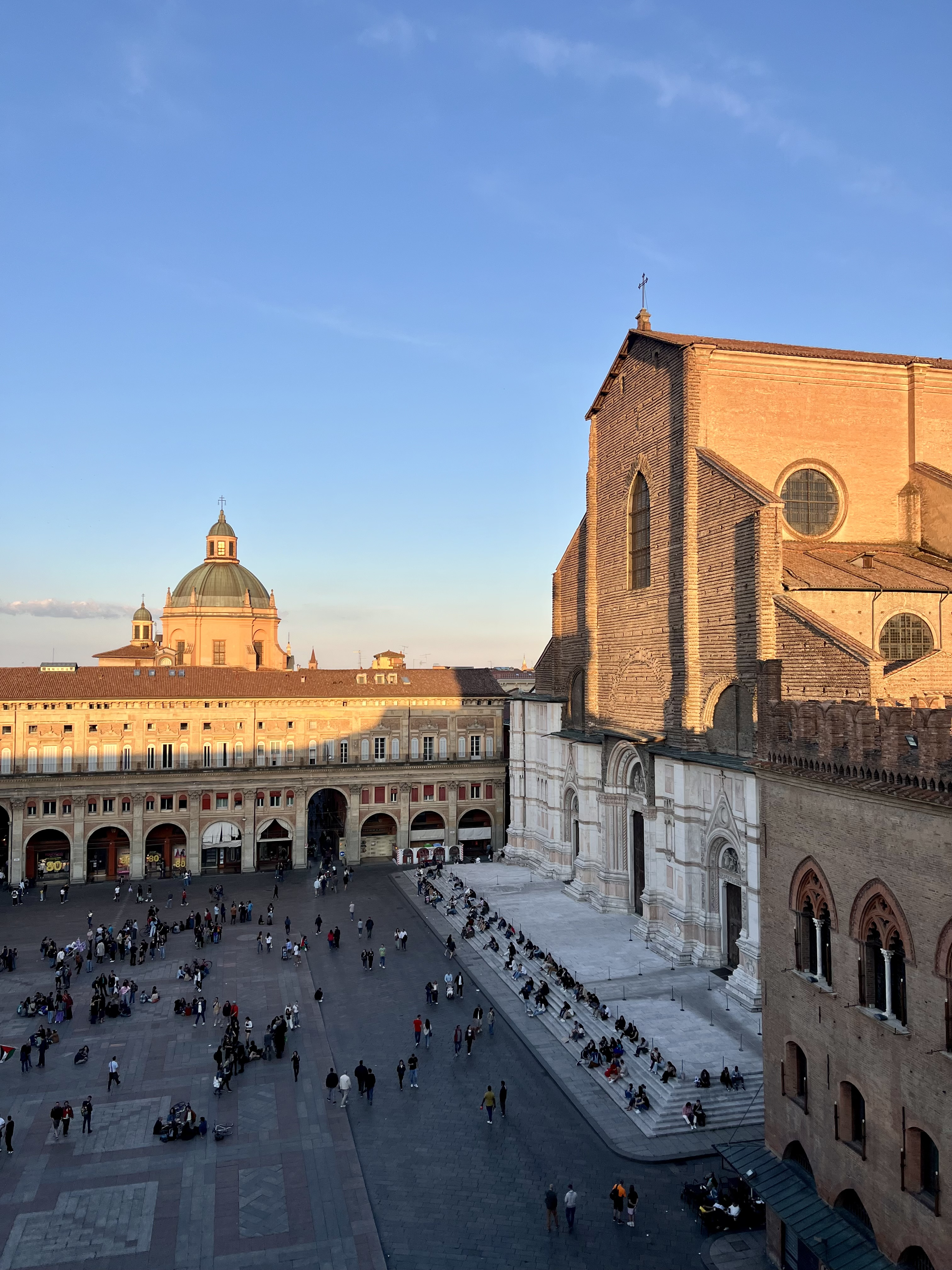
- Interactive map of Piazza Maggiore
- Periods: Middle Age
- Location: Bologna, Italy

History
- Built: 12–15th century

Piazza Maggiore (Piâza Mażåur in the Bolognese language) is a central square in Bologna, region of Emilia-Romagna, Italy, a hub within the city since medieval times. The Northwest corner opens into Piazza del Nettuno with its Fontana del Nettuno, while the Northeast corner opens into the narrower Piazza Re Enzo, running along the flanks of the Palazzo Re Enzo that merges with the Palazzo del Podestà. Flanking the Piazza del Nettuno is the Biblioteca Salaborsa.

== Layout ==
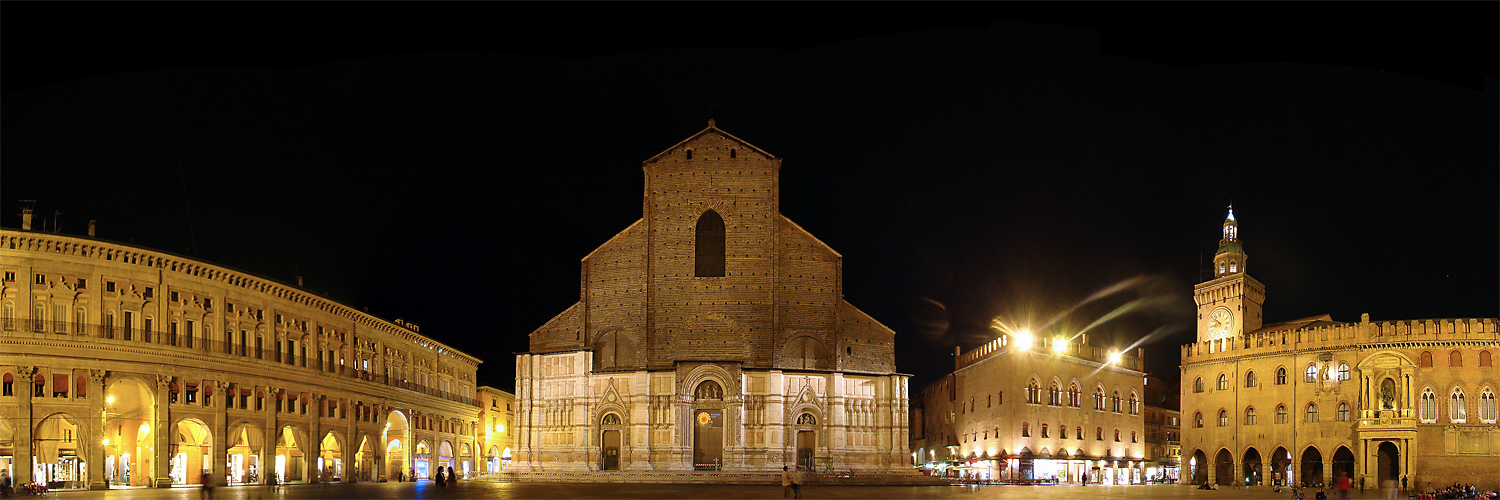
Piazza Maggiore; from left to right: Palazzo dei Banchi, Basilica di San Petronio, Palazzo dei Notai, Palazzo d'Accursio.

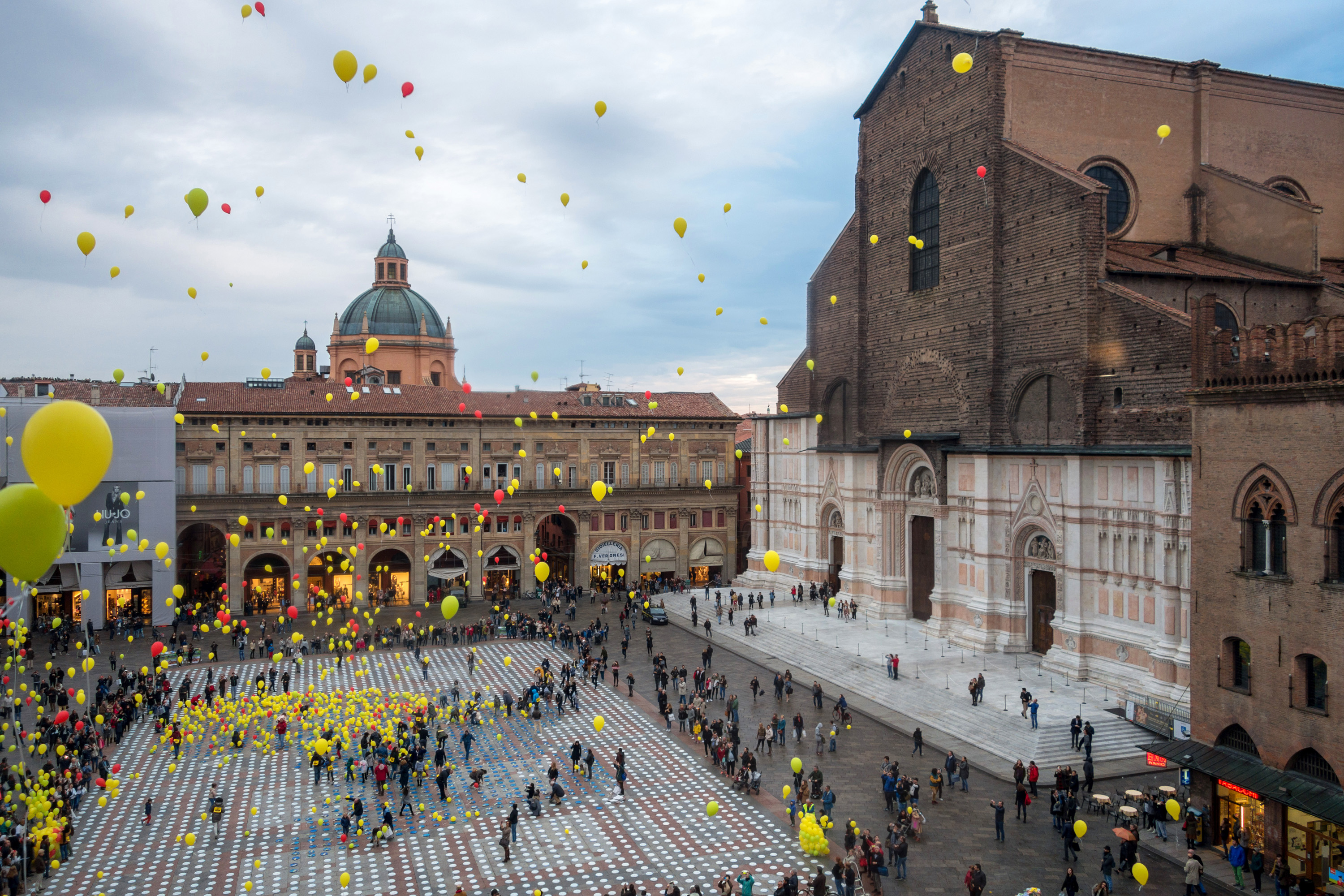
Piazza Maggiore

The square is surrounded by major administrative and religious buildings in the history of Bologna, including:

- Palazzo d'Accursio (W) – city hall and museum
- Palazzo dei Notai (SW) – former notaries' guild
- Basilica of San Petronio (SE) – Duomo of Bologna
- Palazzo dei Banchi (E) – former banking center
- Palazzo del Podestà, Bologna (N) – former police and justice offices
