= Antonio di Vincenzo =

Italian architect

Antoni di Vincenzo (1350 − 1401/1402) was an Italian architect, active mainly in his native Bologna in a Gothic style.

In 1384, he designed the Palazzo della Mercanzia (Loggia of Merchants) in Bologna, which is built in brick and terracotta. The shrine crowns a pair of arches. The loggia partially collapsed under the bombing of 1943, but was faithfully rebuilt after the War. Its wooden porches of the thirteenth century Seracchioli House, within walking distance of two major towers are commonly photographed.

In 1390, Antonio began the construction of the Basilica di San Petronio.

In 1397, Antonio built the second bell tower of the church of San Francesco in a Lombard-style.
