= Niccolò da Bologna =

Italian painter

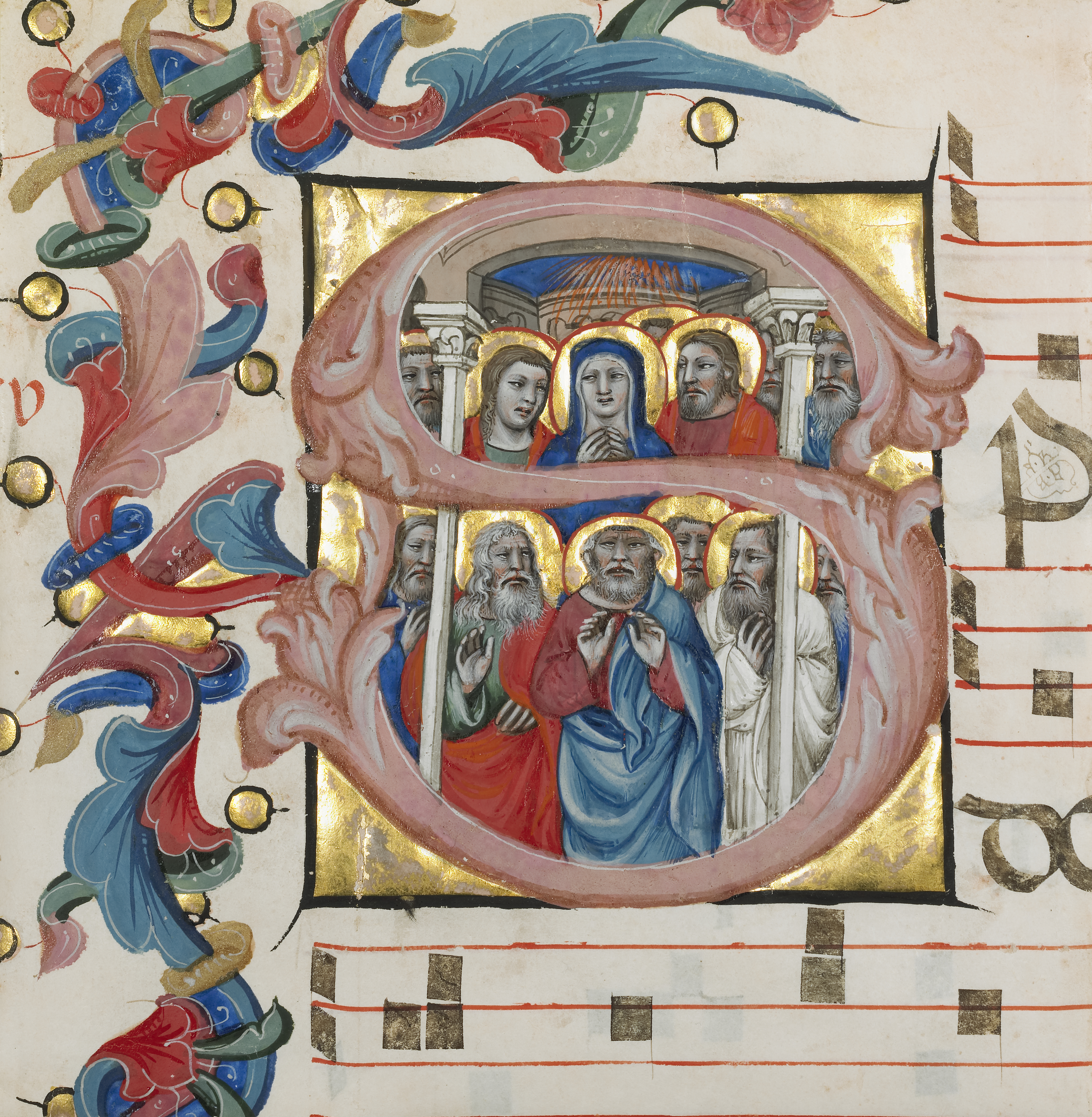
Niccolò da Bologna's tempera and gold on parchment, 1394-1402, J. Paul Getty Trust

Niccolò di Giacomo da Bologna (c. 1325 – c. 1403), usually known as Niccolò da Bologna, was one of the most important and prolific manuscript illuminators in 14th-century Bologna. He was active from about 1349 to 1403. He is known for his expressive figures and crowded, action-filled narrative scenes. The first signed works by Niccolò are all copies of Gratian's ‘Decretals’, one of the standard works of canon law.

He and his workshop later illuminated a variety of other manuscripts, including university texts, choir books and other liturgical texts, private devotional books, and even works of secular poetry and drama. Niccolò also illuminated a number of specialty books made for various corporate groups in the city, such as statute books and guild registers. He was a financially successful artist who was appointed illuminator to the city of Bologna in the 1380s and was an active member of city government. He was the uncle of the artist Jacopo di Paolo (active 1371-1426).

== Gallery ==
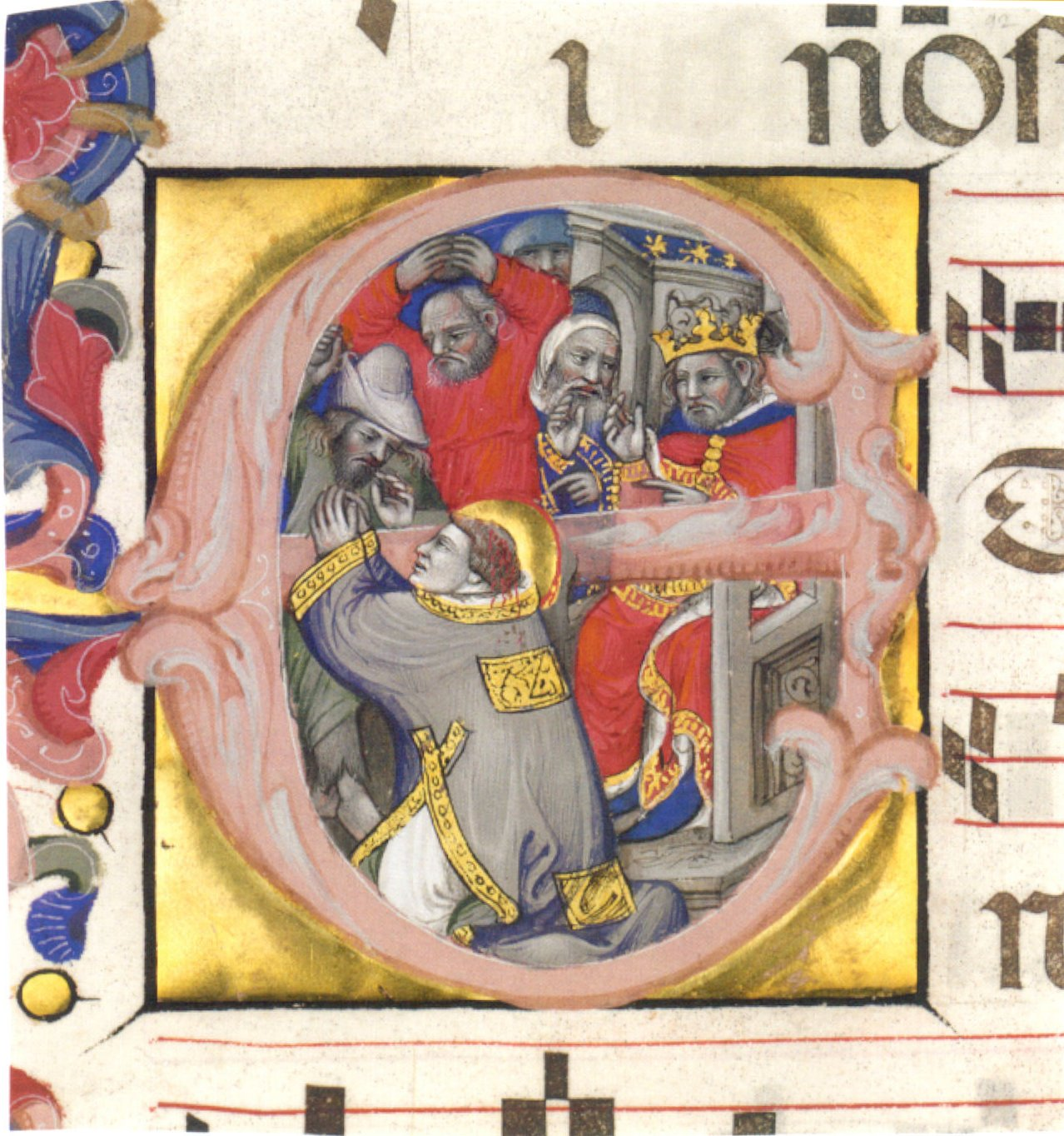
Niccolò da Bologna's tempera, gold and ink on parchment, 1494-1502, Metropolitan Museum of Art

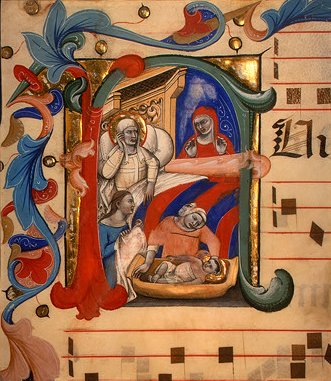
The Birth of John the Baptist, miniature on vellum by Niccolò da Bologna, National Gallery of Art, Washington DC, late 14th century

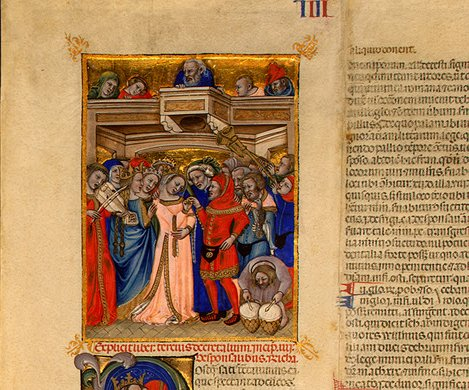
The Marriage, 1350s, miniature on vellum by Niccolò da Bologna, 1350s, National Gallery of Art, Washington DC
