= Pietro di Giovanni Lianori =

Italian painter

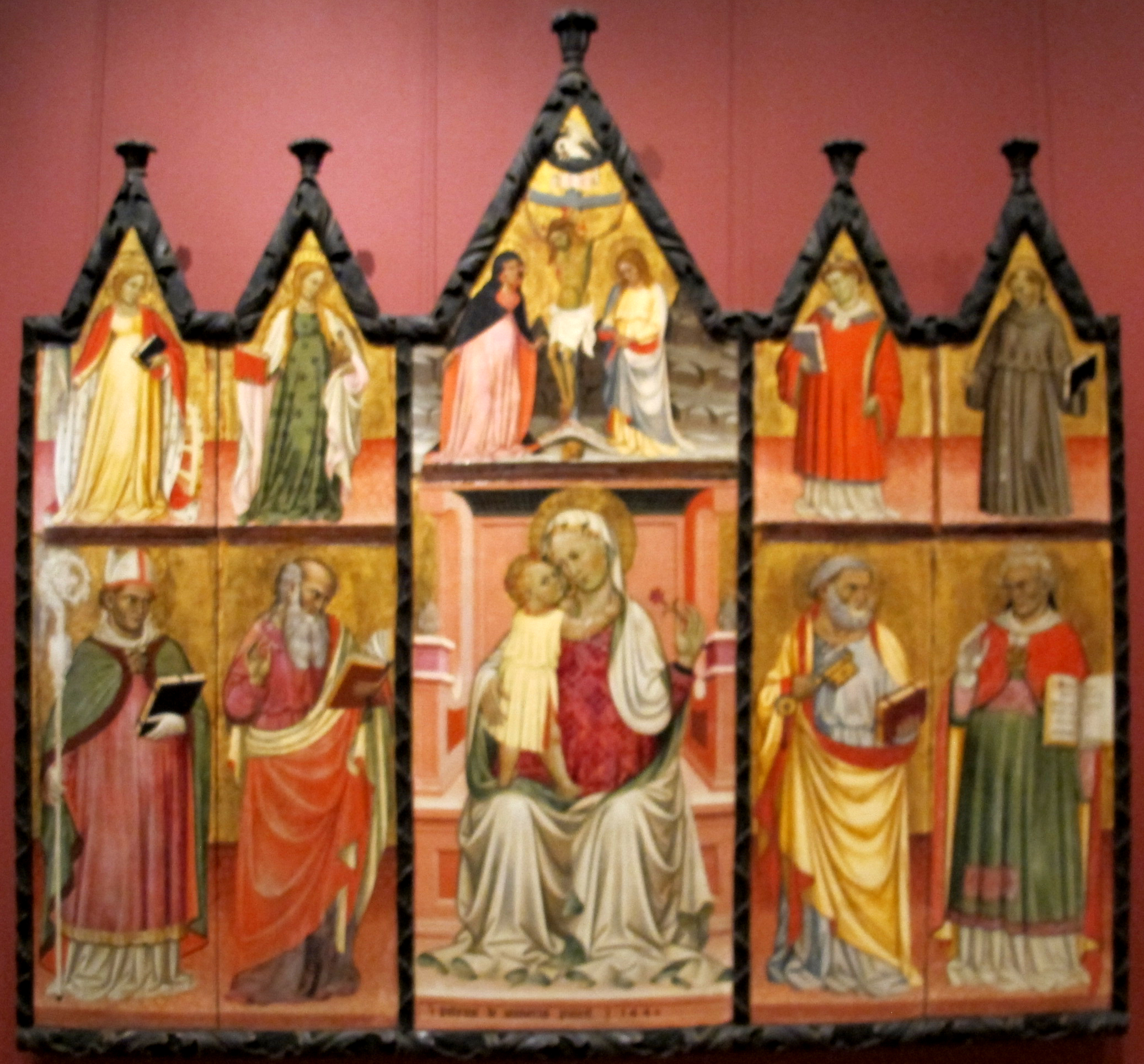
Madonna with Child and Saints, 1440

Pietro di Giovanni Lianori (active 1412–1453) was an Italian painter, active in Bologna.

== Biography ==
Little is known of his biography. He signed one of his works Petrus Joanis.

Among his works is the canvas with an Enthroned Madonna and Saints Catherine and John the Evangelist (1412) for the church of San Pietro in Fiesso, in the town of Castenaso. His style is allied to the Gothic style demonstrated by Lippo di Dalmasio and Jacopo di Paolo.

Another attributed work is a fresco of the Madonna in Glory with Four Saints for the bell-tower of the church of San Francesco; a Madonna with Angels for the Certosa of Bologna; and a Madonna and Child for the Foscarari chapel in the church of San Petronio.

Pietro Lianori also painted a polyptych depicting an Enthroned Madonna and Child hild, crowned by angels and accompanied by Saints Jerome and Petronio with a superior frieze depicting Annunciation to the Virgin with Saints Stephen, Dominic, Francis, and Augustine (1453), now in the Pinacoteca Nazionale di Bologna. The painting was once the main altarpiece in the Sacristy of the church of San Girolamo di Miramonte.
