= Giuseppe Marsigli (tenor) =

Italian tenor

Giuseppe Marsigli (fl. 1677 – c. 1727) was an Italian tenor. He studied singing in his native city of Bologna. He was a tenor in the choir of the San Petronio, Bologna from 1677 through 1727. Simultaneously he was in service to Ferdinando Carlo Gonzaga, Duke of Mantua and Montferrat as a virtuoso singer in his court from 1686 through 1700. He also was a leading tenor in opera houses in many Italian cities, making his debut in 1677 as Floro in Giovanni Legrenzi's Germanico sul Reno in Modena. In Bologna he created roles in the premieres of Luca Antonio Predieri's Partenope (1710) and Antonio Giannettini's Artaserse (1711). He also performed in operas in Milan, Turin, and Genoa. It is unknown where and when he died.
