= Biblioteca Salaborsa =

Main public library in Bologna, Italy

Coordinates: 44.4947°N 11.3422°E

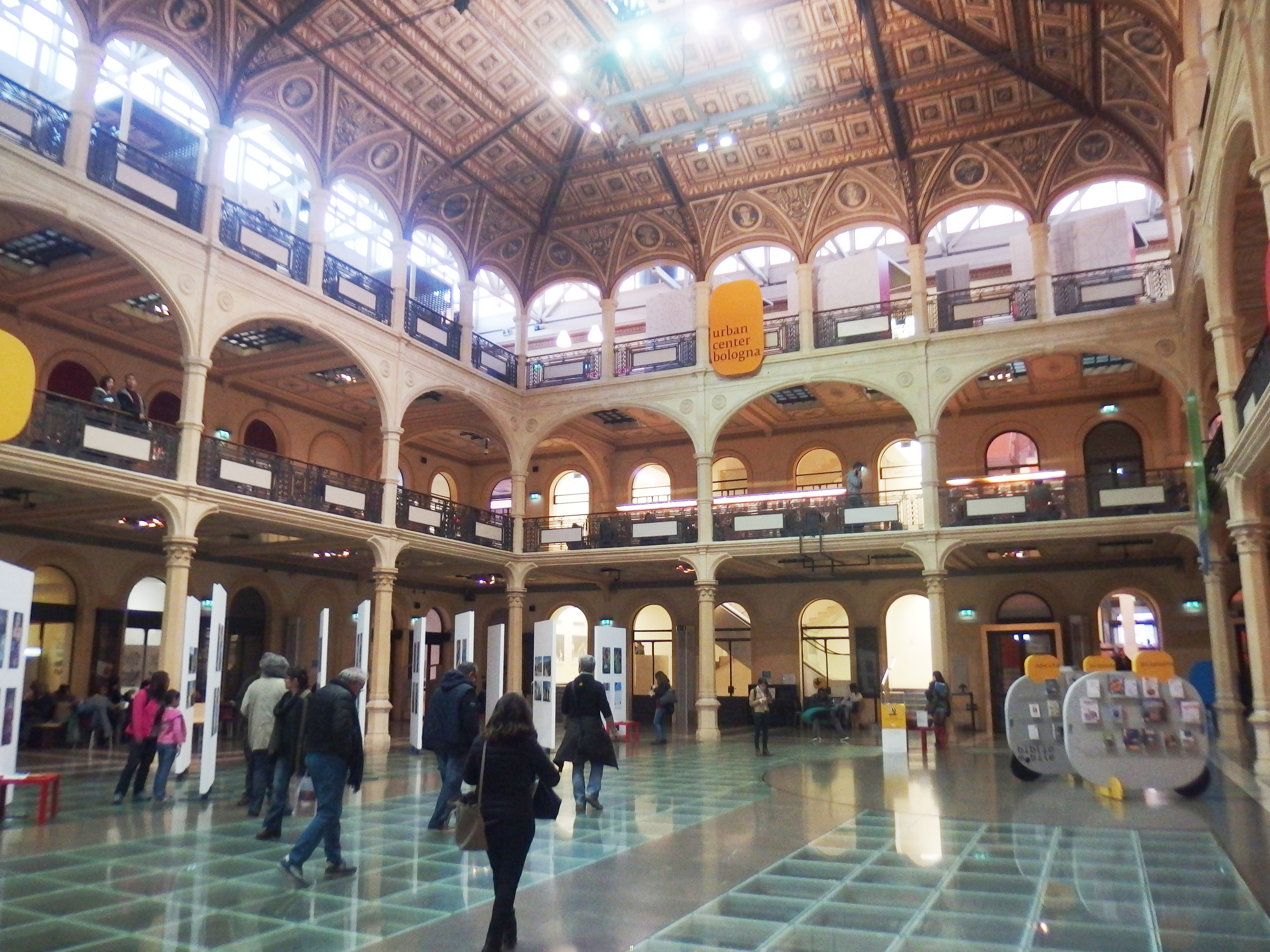
Urban Center Bologna, Italy.

Salaborsa is the main public library in Bologna, region of Emilia-Romagna, Italy.

In 2001, the central offices of the public library were moved into the northern portions of the Palazzo d'Accursio, flanking the Piazza del Nettuno, which is just north of the Piazza Maggiore. Visitors to the library are able to see an archaeological site through the crystal floor in the centre of the library. The ancient ruins are also accessible from the basement floor, where there is information about them.

== History ==
The library was opened in 2001, although the building it resides in, Palazzo d'Accursio, is far older. The ruins, on which the site was built, include remains from the ancient city of Bononia, which dates back to 189 BC. There are also Etruscan ruins on site that predate the Roman ones.

== Bibliography ==
- Francisco Giordano, La Residenza delle Regie Poste nel Palazzo Comunale di Bologna, Il Carrobbio: rivista di studi bolognesi, 1988, XIV, 185-195.
- Francisco Giordano, Un posto al sole. Poste a Bologna, Bologna ieri, oggi, domani, 1995, IV, 40, 21-24.
- Francisco Giordano, Le Regie Poste di Bologna, il gabbiano: notiziario delle Poste Italiane, Roma, 1998, 8, 42, 72-73.
- Anna Maria Brandinelli. La Biblioteca Sala Borsa di Bologna: storia del progetto e dei luoghi, Biblioteche oggi, 2002, 4, 6-18.
- Elena Boretti. Passeggiando tra gli scaffali, Biblioteche oggi, 2002, 4, 20-22.
- Fabrizia Benedetti. Non solo reference, Biblioteche oggi, 2002, 4, 23-25.
- Rino Pensato. La raccolta di Sala Borsa e la biblioteca di Nero Wolfe, Biblioteche oggi, 2002, 4, 28-25.
- Valeria Patregnani. Dai bebè agli adolescenti, Biblioteche oggi, 2002, 4, 36-38.
- Elena Boretti e Maria Luisa Rinaldi. Sala Borsa un anno dopo, Biblioteche oggi, 2003, 10, 25-28.
- Laura Collodel. La misura delle raccolte, Biblioteche oggi, 2003, 10, 28-32.
- La Sala Borsa di Bologna. Il Palazzo e la Biblioteca, a cura di Paola Foschi e Marco Poli (text by Jacopo Ortalli, Cecilia Ugolini, Francisco Giordano, Marco Poli, Roberto Scannavini, Giordano Gasparini, Anna Maria Brandinelli, Tiziana Nanni, Fabrizia Benedetti, Elena Boretti e Paola Furlan), Bologna, Editrice Compositori, 2003. ISBN 88-7794-414-5.
- La Sala Borsa di Bologna. Il palazzo e la biblioteca. The Sala Borsa of Bologna. The building and the library, by Paola Foschi e/and Marco Poli (text by Jacopo Ortalli, Cecilia Ugolini, Francisco Giordano, Marco Poli, Roberto Scannavini, Giordano Gasparini, Anna Maria Brandinelli, Tiziana Nanni, Fabrizia Benedetti, Elena Boretti e Paola Furlan), Bologna, Editrice Compositori, 2004. ISBN 88-7794-435-8.
- Virginia Gentilini. Il wiki di Sala Borsa. Una piattaforma per la comunicazione interna e i servizi al pubblico, Biblioteche oggi, 2009, 2, 35-38.
- Simona Brighetti e Virginia Gentilini. Biblioteca Salaborsa su Facebook. Una storia, AIB Notizie, 2010, 4, 4-5.
