= Master of 1328 =

Italian painter

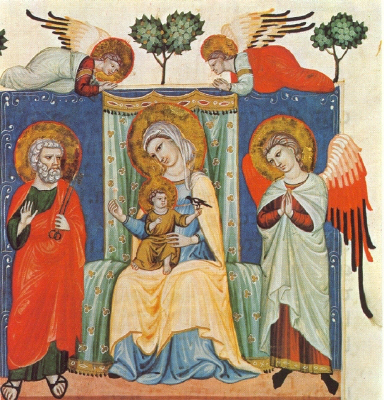
Madonna Enthroned, manuscript illumination from the Matricola dei Merciai of 1328. Tempera on vellum. In the collection of the Civic Museum, Bologna

The Master of 1328 (Italian: Maestro del 1328) was an Italian illuminator active in the area around Bologna from about 1320 until 1340. His name is derived from the date on a tradesman's register, the Matricola dei merciai, now in the Civic Museum in Bologna; his hand may also be discerned in a set of choir books which were painted for the Dominican convent in that city; this group of works is earlier, and can be dated to the first half of the 1320s, as can a copy of Gratian's Decretals now in Madrid. At the same time the Master participated in the creation of the Rhetorica ad Erennium now held at Holkham Hall in Norfolk. Stylistically, while he bears the influence of his local contemporaries, he was evidently also aware of the later paintings of Giotto; he was also the first to apply Giotto's new rules of painting to Bolognese manuscript illumination in anything approaching a regular pattern. Like the Illustratore, with whom he worked on occasion he reached the height of his career in the 1330s, concentrating on the decoration of legal texts.
