= Edifice (disambiguation) =

An edifice is most commonly a building or structure. It can even be an abstract structure such as a theory.

Edifice may also refer to:

- Edifice (volcanic), the erupted volcanic material (lava and tephra) that is deposited around the vent
- Casio Edifice, a brand of watches by Casio
