= Francesco Lola =

Italian painter

Francesco Lola (active 1393–1419) was an Italian painter, active in Bologna.

== Biography ==
Little is known of his biography. Some refer to him as Francesco di Andrea or the name is associated with Francesco de Andreolo Lola. He is known to have collaborated in 1410 with Michele di Matteo in painting processional standards to celebrate the arrival in Bologna of the antipope Alexander V. He also painted frescoes depicting the Enthroned Madonna and Child with Saints and St Agatha Crowned by Angels in the Capella del Crocifisso (Pepoli Chapel) in San Petronio, Bologna.
