= San Petronio, Bologna =

Catholic basilica in Bologna, Emilia-Romagna, Italy

Basilica of Saint Petronius
- Italian: Basilica di San Petronio
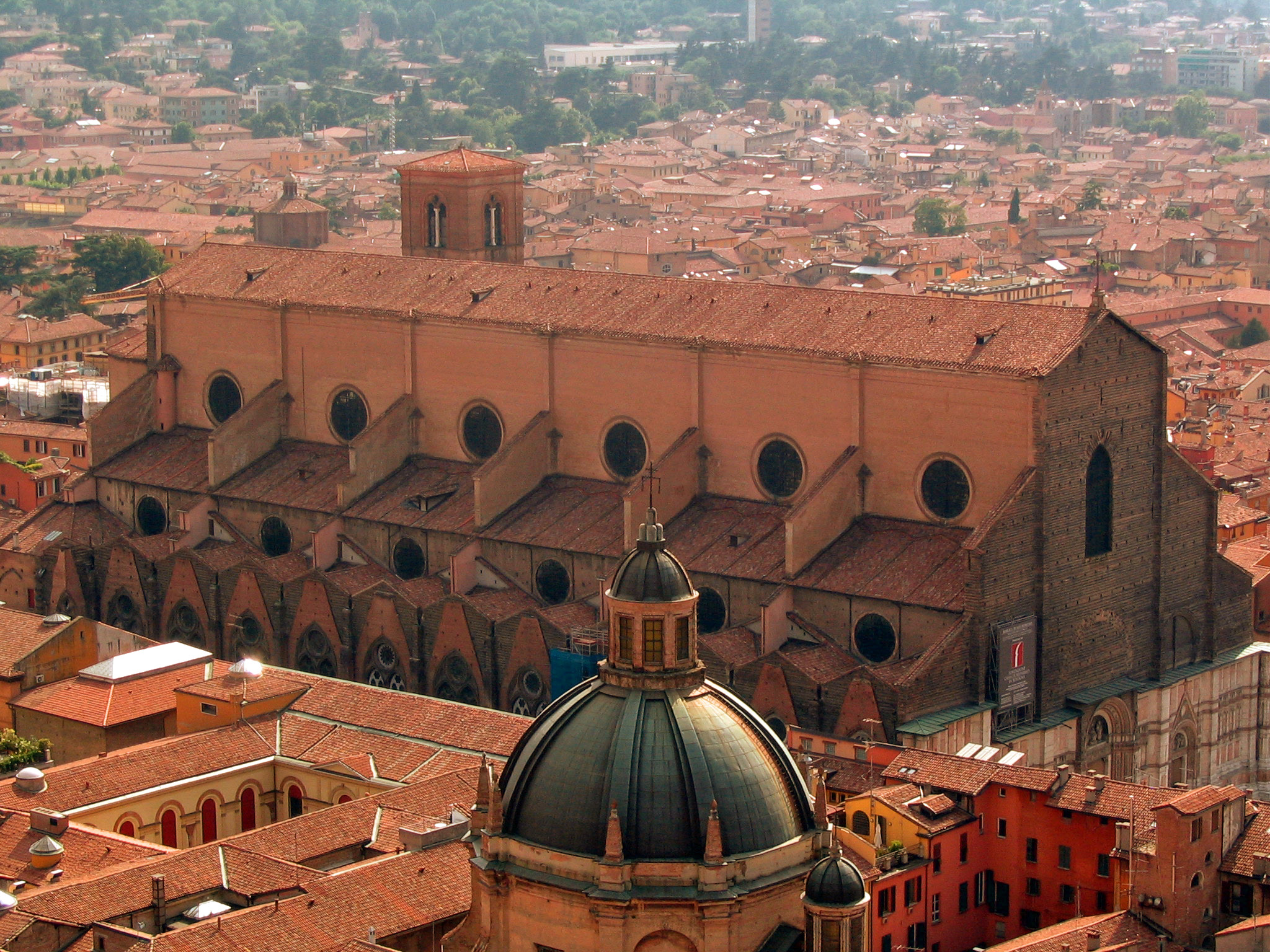

Religion
- Affiliation: Catholic Church
- Province: Archdiocese of Bologna
- Ecclesiastical or organisational status: Basilica
- Patron: Petronius of Bologna
- Status: Active

Location
- Location: Bologna, Italy
- Interactive map of Basilica of Saint Petronius
- Coordinates: 44°29′34″N 11°20′37″E

Architecture
- Type: Church
- Style: Italian Gothic
- Groundbreaking: 1390
- Capacity: 28,000

The Basilica of San Petronio (Italian: Basilica di San Petronio) is a minor basilica and church of the Archdiocese of Bologna located in Bologna, Emilia-Romagna, northern Italy. It dominates Piazza Maggiore. The basilica is dedicated to the patron saint of the city, Saint Petronius, who was the Bishop of Bologna in the fifth century. Construction began in 1390 and its main façade has remained unfinished since. The building was transferred from the city to the diocese in 1929; the basilica was finally consecrated in 1954. It has been the seat of the relics of Bologna's patron saint only since 2000; until then, they were preserved in the Santo Stefano church.

== History ==
=== Construction ===
In 1388, the Consiglio Generale dei Seicento prepared the construction of the church as a civic temple. To make room for the church, the adjacent Curia of Sancti Ambrosii was demolished, together with the majority of one of the city's burgs, including at least eight churches and towers. The first stone of construction was laid on 7 June 1390 under the supervision of architect Antonio di Vincenzo. Works lasted for several centuries: after the completion of the first version of the façade, in 1393 the first pair of side chapels were begun. The series were completed only in 1479.

The third bay was built in 1441–1446. Its construction was delayed by the cardinal Baldassarre Cossa, who sold the construction material of the basilica and kept the money.

In 1514, Arduino degli Arriguzzi was chosen as the architect to construct the dome. His proposal included a large dome resting upon the width between the side aisles, which necessitated larger transepts and apses. The project was considered too complicated, and after building the first two pillars and two triangular pylons for the dome, the work was halted. According to legend, Pope Pius IV halted the "megalomaniac dream" and instead encouraged the construction of the Archiginnasio of Bologna.

== Architecture ==
=== Exterior ===
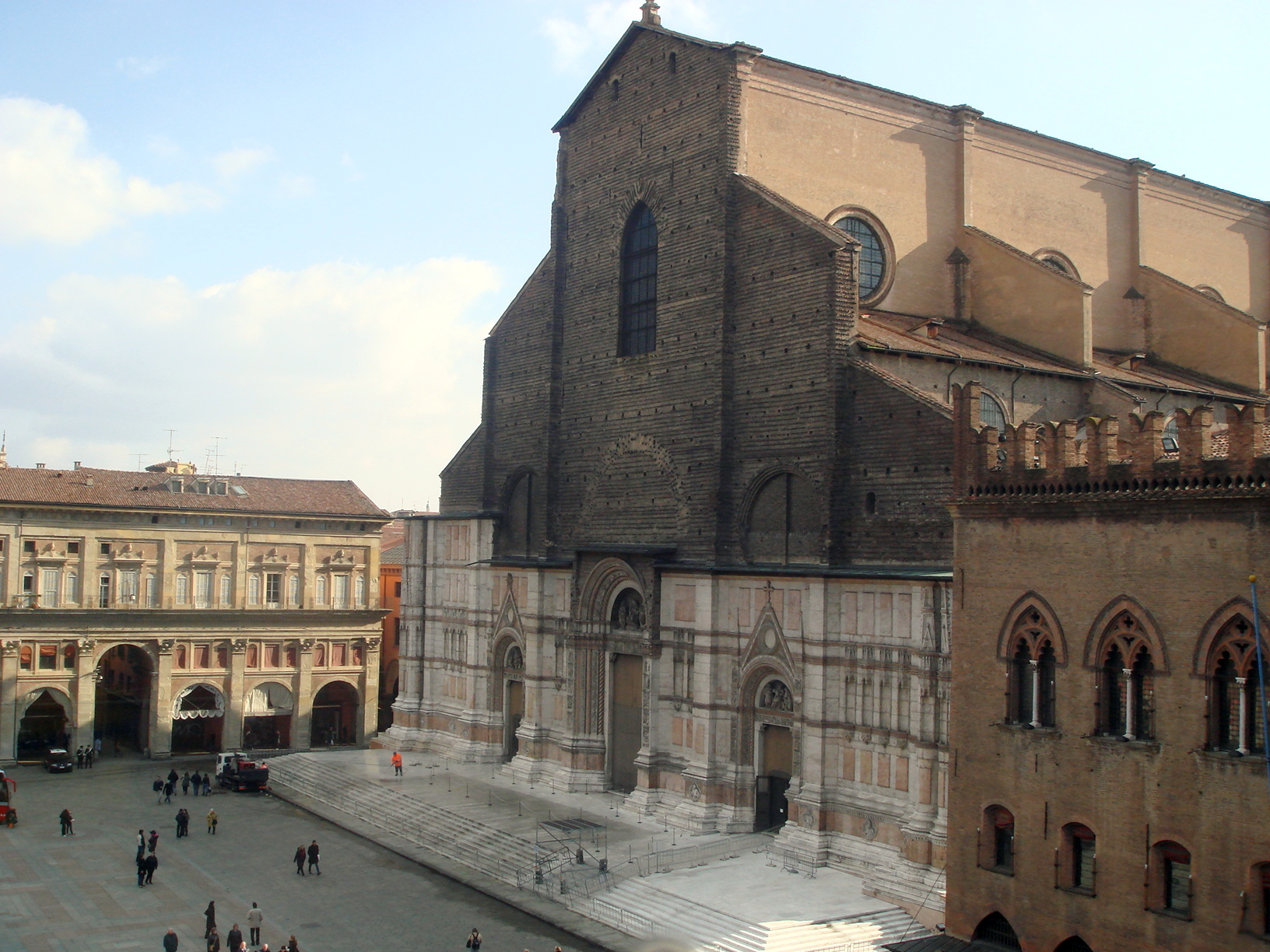
San Petronio Basilica and Piazza Maggiore.

The basilica is a large church measuring 132 metres long, 66 metres wide, and 47 metres tall, and is described as the "most imposing" church in Bologna. The façade was designed by Domenico da Varignana and started in 1538 by Giacomo Ranuzzi. However, it remains unfinished.

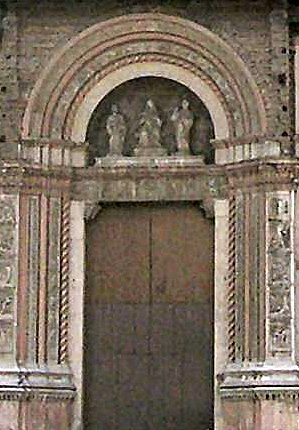
The Porta Magna with sculpture by Jacopo della Quercia

The main doorway (Porta Magna) was decorated by Jacopo della Quercia of Siena with scenes from the Old Testament on the pillars, eighteen prophets on the archivolt, scenes from the New Testament on the architrave, and a Madonna and Child, Saint Ambrose and Saint Petronius on the tympanum. It is flanked by two side doors, with Alfonso Lombardi's Resurrection on the left and Amico Aspertini's Deposition on the right.

The central nave covering and apse shooting were completed in 1663, designed by Girolamo Rainaldi and directed by Francesco Martini. The lower naves are enclosed by rectilinear walls. The first two windows were designed by Antonio with the assistance of Francesco di Simone, Domenico da Milano, Pagno di Lapo Portigiani and Antonio di Simone. The bell tower was designed by Giovanni da Brensa and built between 1481 and 1487.

Details of the decoration of the main doorway by Jacopo della Quercia, photographed by Paolo Monti

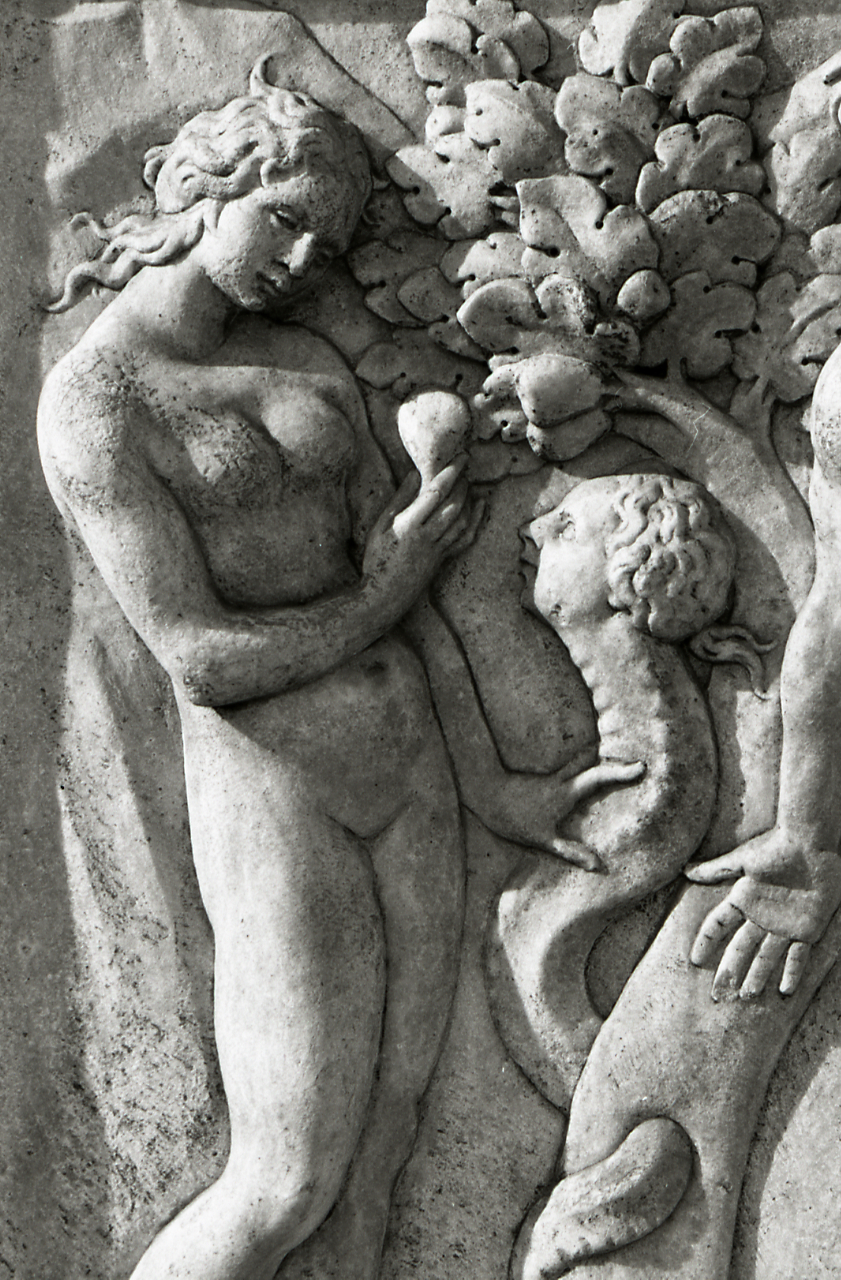
Original sin

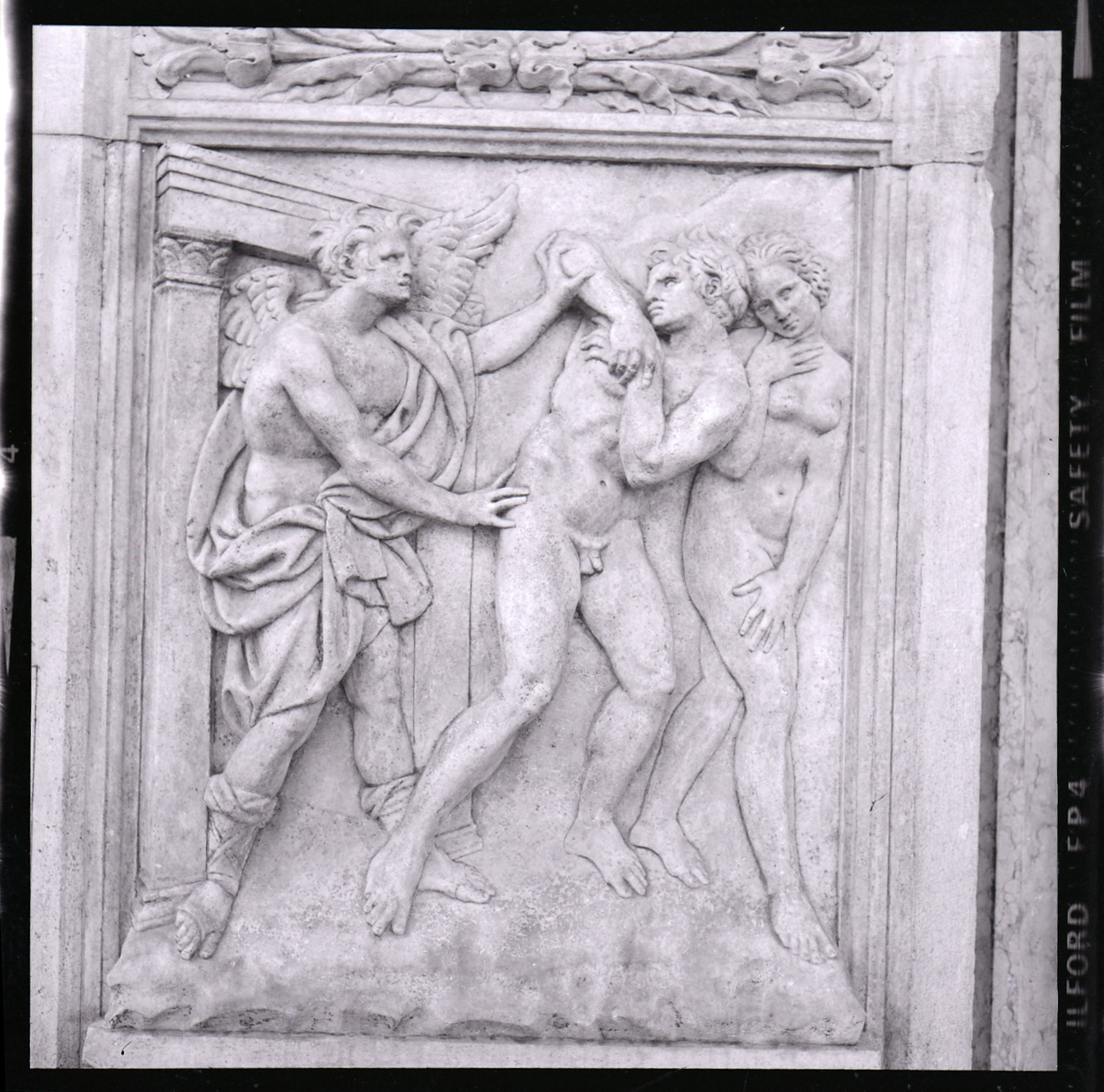
Fall of man

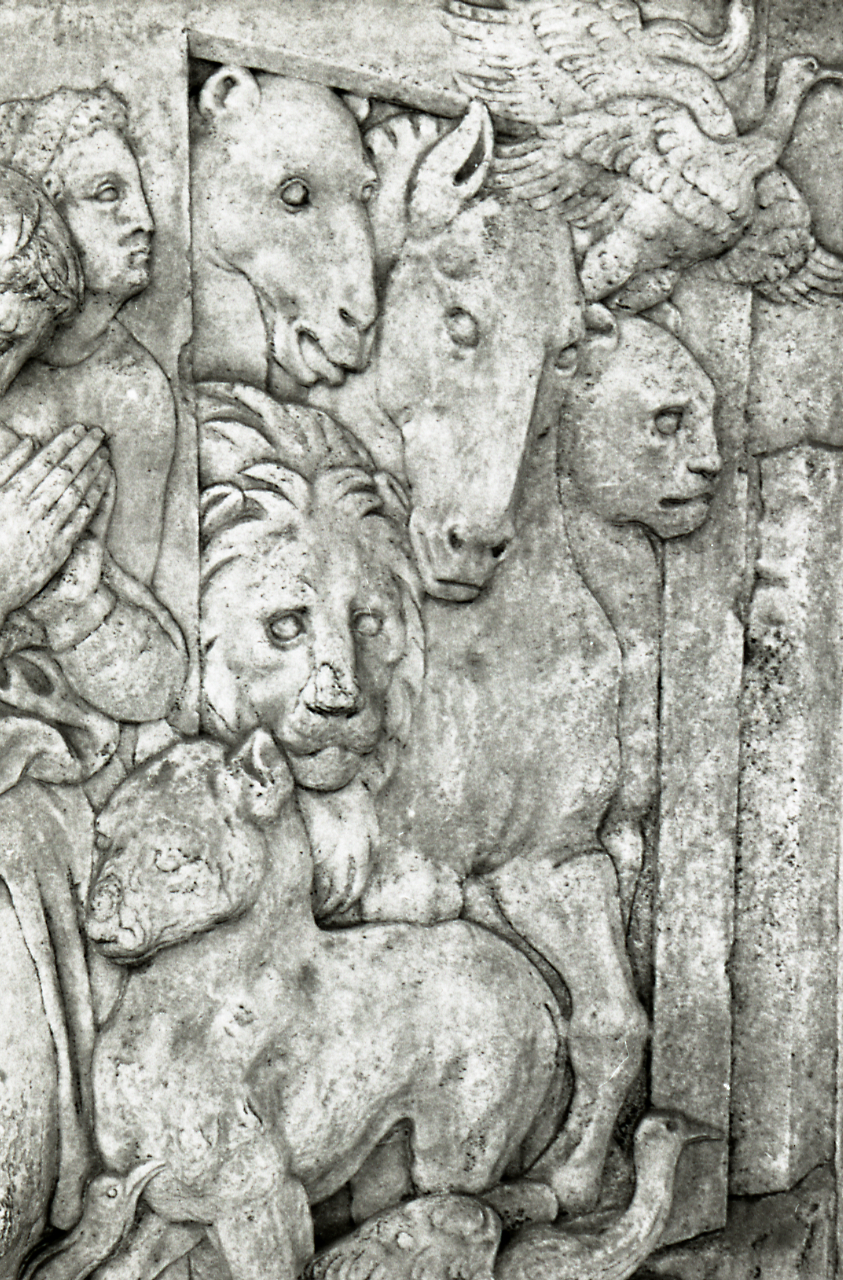
Noah's Ark

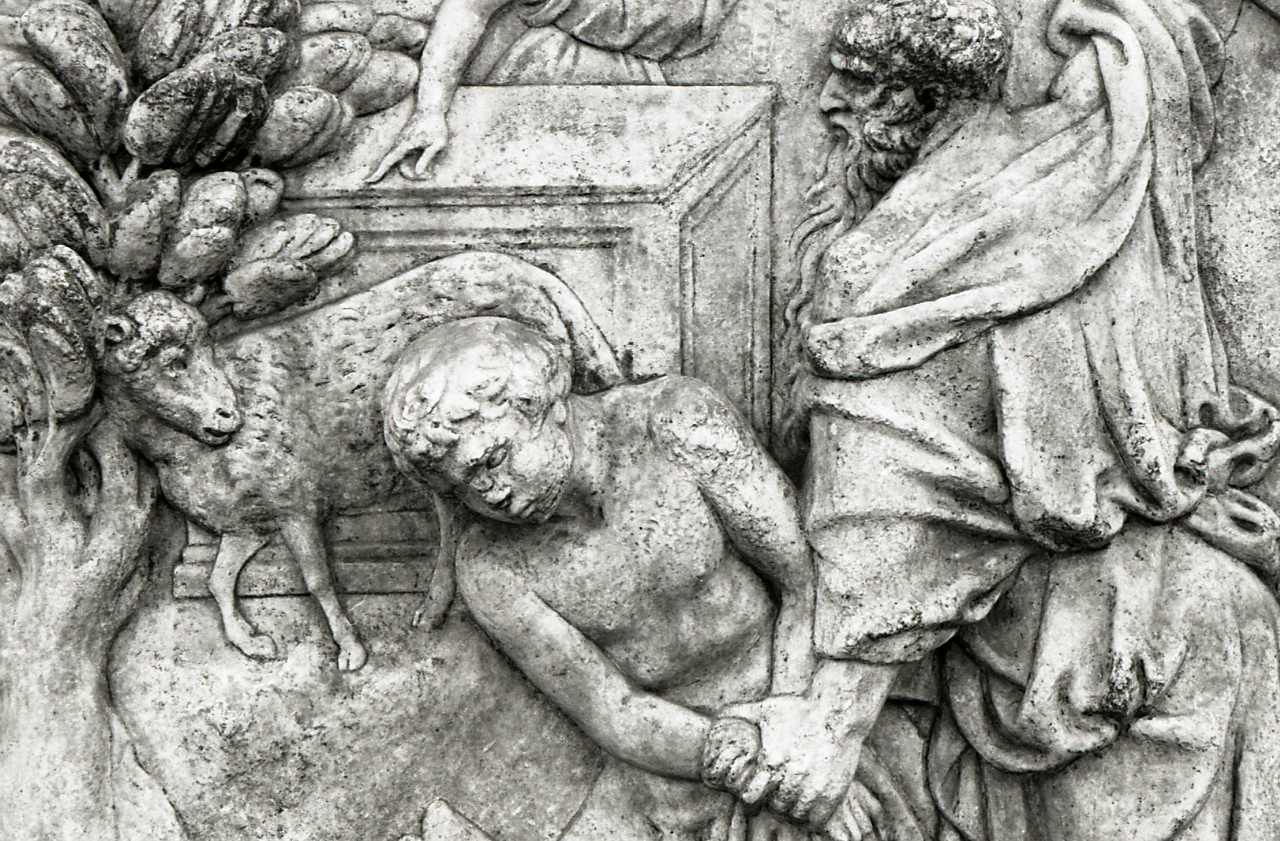
Binding of Isaac

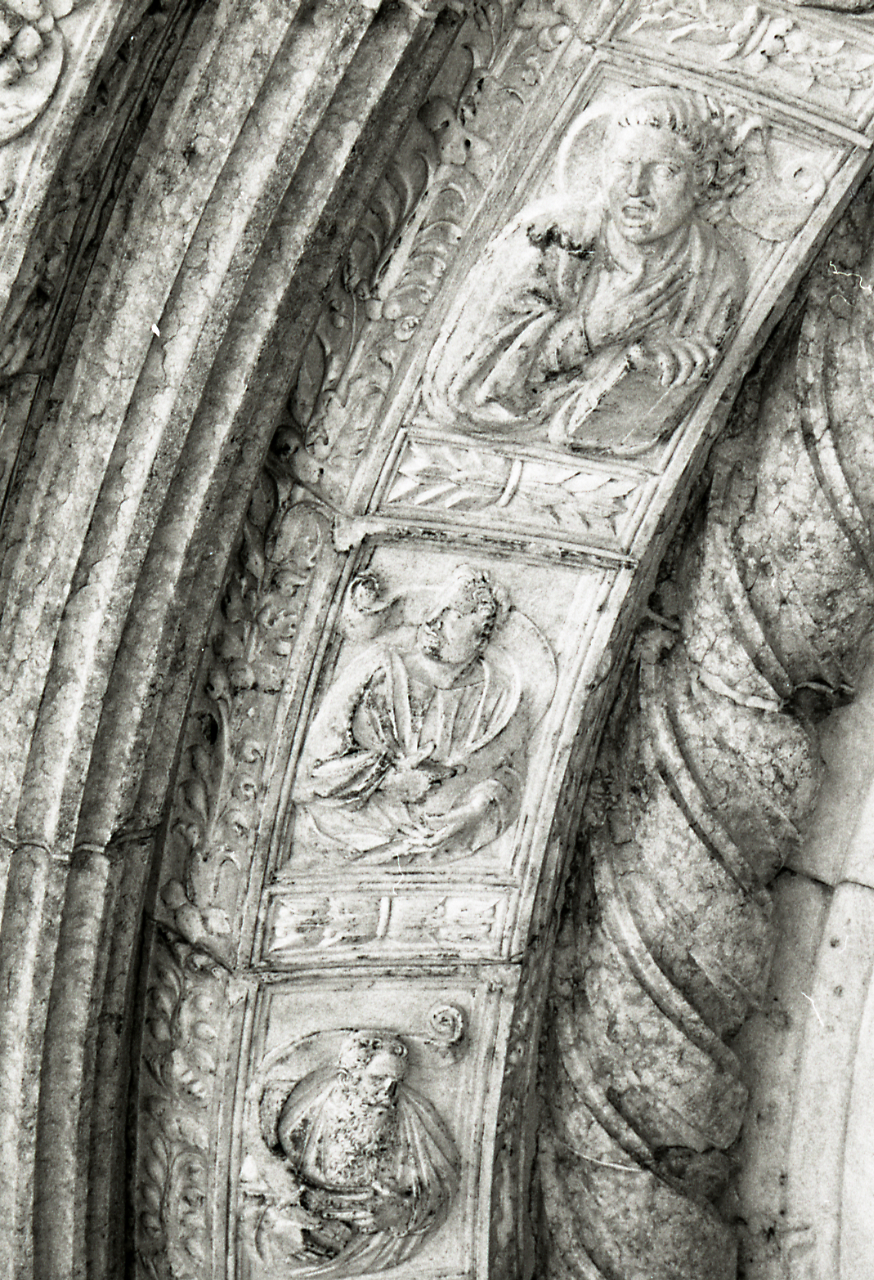
Prophets on the archivolt

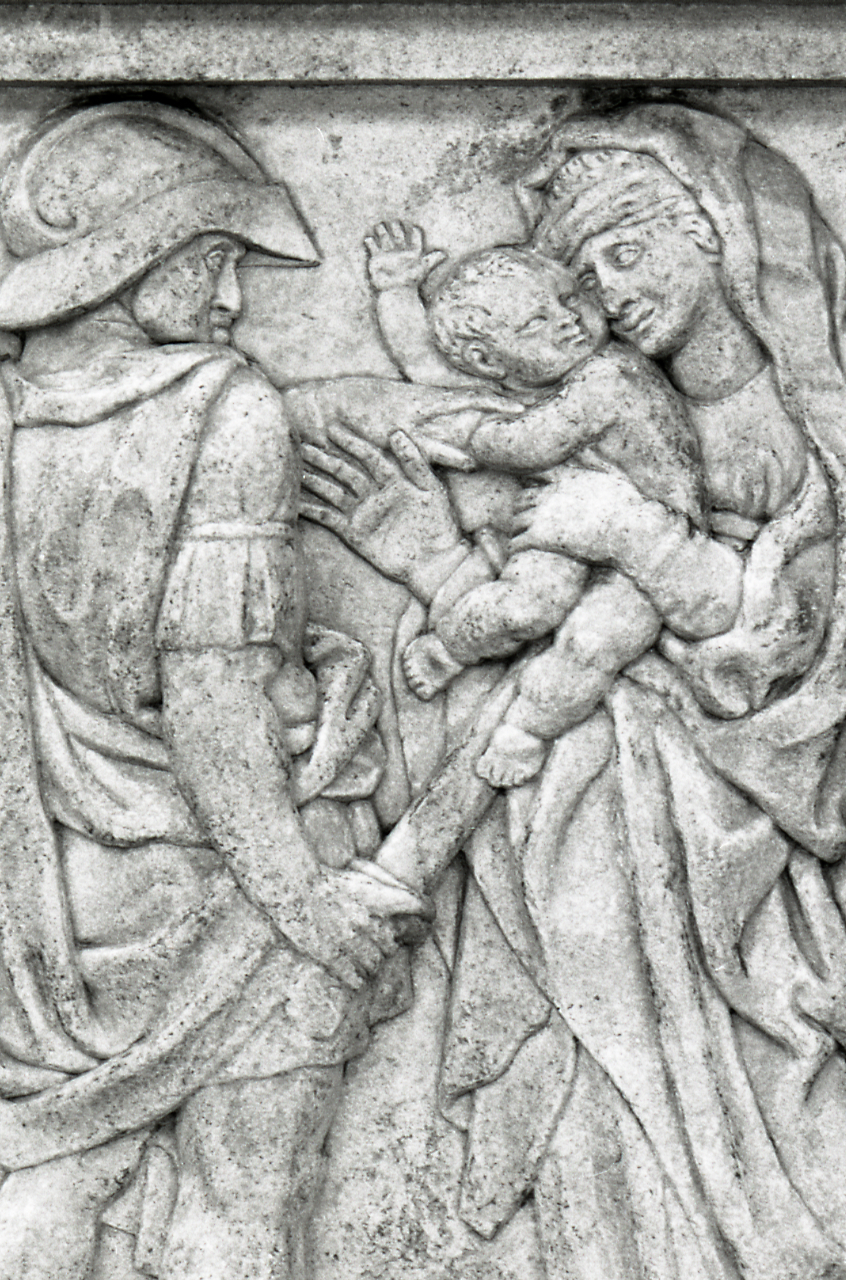
Massacre of the Innocents

=== Interior ===
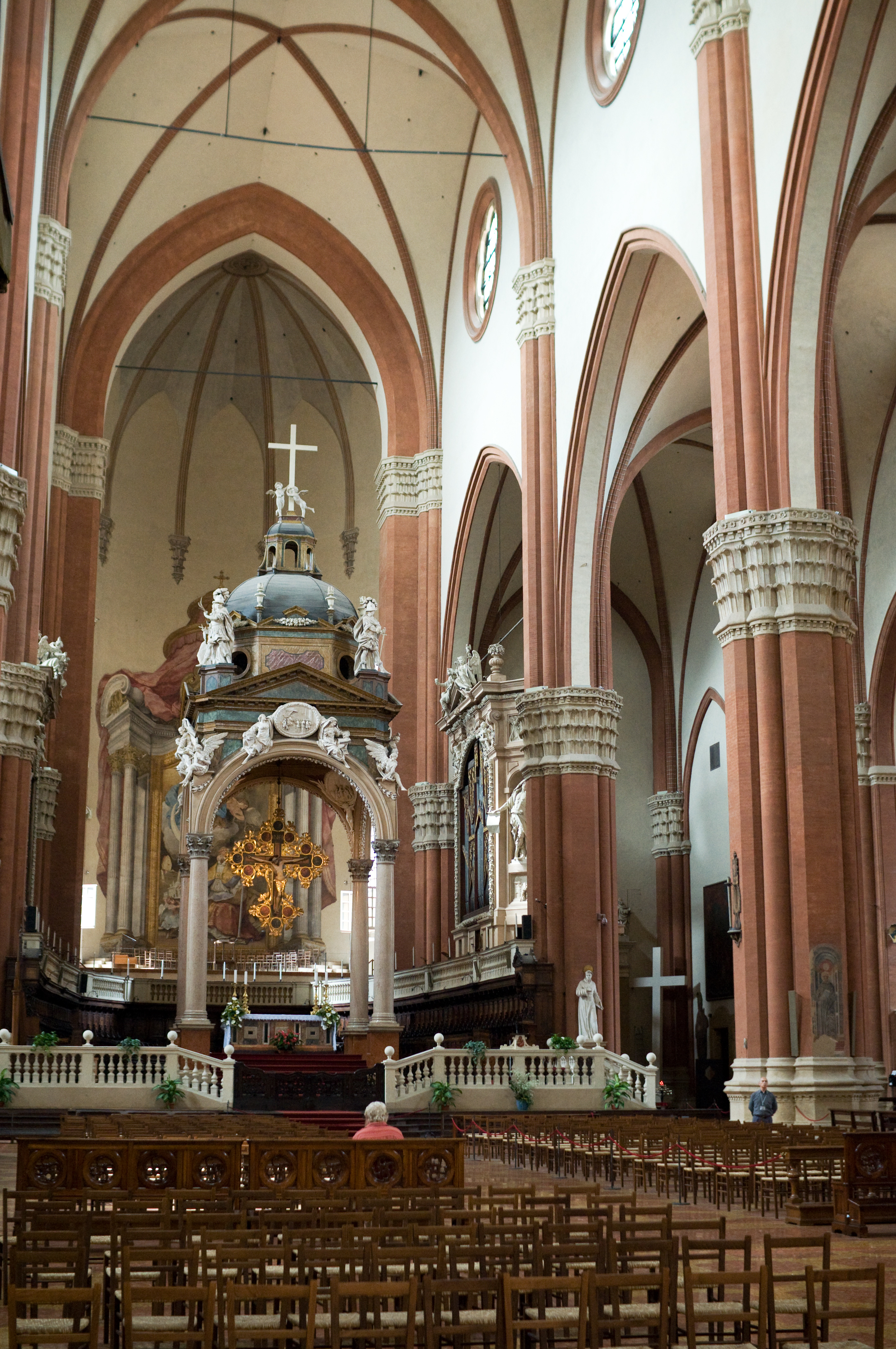
The nave, with Vignola's ciborium

The interior houses a Madonna with Saints by Lorenzo Costa the Younger, and a Pietà by Amico Aspertini.

==== Main altar ====
The altar contains a 15th-century wooden crucifix. At the back, a fresco of the Madonna with St. Petronio by Marcantonio Franceschini and Luigi Quaini, cartoons by Cignani (1672). The ciborium of the main altar was built in 1547 by Jacopo Barozzi da Vignola.

The fifteenth-century wooden choir was completed by Agostino de 'Marchi. The vaulting and decoration of the central nave is by Girolamo Rainaldi, who completed them in 1646–1658.

==== Side chapels ====
The nave contains twenty-two side chapels:

1. Chapel of St. Abbondio, formerly of the Dieci di Balia – restored in neo-Gothic style in 1865. In this chapel, in the year 1530, Emperor Charles V was crowned by Pope Clement VII.
2. Chapel of St. Petronio, once of the Cospi and Aldrovandi families, designed by Alfonso Torreggiani, designed to contain the relic of the head of San Petronio.
3. Chapel of St. Ivo, Formerly of the family of San Brigida dei Foscherari: it has statues of Angelo Piò and the paintings of the Madonna of St. Luke and Saints Emidio and Ivo by Gaetano Gandolfi and Apparition of the Virgin to St. Francesca Romana by Alessandro Tiarini (1615). On the pillar, two clocks, one of the first made in Italy with the correction of the pendulum (1758).
4. Chapel of the Magi, once of Bolognini family: its marble Gothic balustrade designed by Antonio di Vincenzo (1400); the Triptych wooden altar with twenty-seven figures carved and painted by Jacopo di Paolo. The walls were painted by Giovanni di Pietro Falloppi/Giovanni da Modena with a cycle depicting the Episodes in the life of San Petronio, the back wall, right wall, Stories of the Three Kings; the left wall, at the top, The Last Judgment with the Coronation of the Virgin in oval, and the controversial Heaven and Hell, Dante's depiction of the places, with a gigantic figure of Lucifer.
5. Chapel of St. Sebastian, once of Vaselli family.
6. Chapel of St. Vincent Ferrer, formerly of the Griffoni, and Cospi-Ranuzzi families: bronze monument of Cardinal Giacomo Lercaro made by Giacomo Manzù (1954).
7. Chapel of St. James, formerly of the Rossi and Baciocchi families: the Madonna Enthroned on the altar was painted by Lorenzo Costa (1492), to the same author attributed the designs of the stained glass. Funeral monument containing the remains of Prince Felix Baciocchi and his wife Elisa Bonaparte (1845).
8. Chapel of St. Rocco, formerly of the Ranuzzi family: it contains a Saint Roch with a Donor by Parmigianino (1527).
9. Chapel of St. Michael formerly of the Barbazzi and Manzoli families: it houses a painting of Archangel Michael defeating the Fallen Angels by Denys Calvaert (1582).
10. Chapel of St. Rosalie, formerly of the Sixteen of the Senate, now the Town Hall: canvas of Glory of Santa Barbara by Tiarini.
11. Chapel of St. Bernardino stands before the fifteenth-century organ case by Lorenzo da Prato, the chapel was painted in 1531 by Aspertini with Four Stories of St. Petronius.
12. Chapel of the Relics, formerly of Zambeccari family.
13. Chapel of St. Peter Martyr, formerly the Society of Beccari, with marble railing by Francesco di Simone (late fifteenth century);
14. Chapel of St. Anthony of Padua, formerly of Saraceni and Cospi families: the statue of St. Anthony of Padua attributed to Jacopo Sansovino.
15. Chapel of the Blessed Sacrament, formerly of the Malvezzi Campeggi, rebuilt in the nineteenth century.
16. Chapel of the Immaculate, formerly of Fantuzzi family: art nouveau decorations by Achille Casanova.
17. Chapel of St. Jerome, formerly of the Castelli: the St. Jerome altar attributed to Lorenzo Costa.
18. Chapel of St. Lorenzo, formerly of the Garganelli, Ratta and Pallotti families: the Pieta was painted by Aspertini.
19. Chapel of the Cross, formerly of the Notai: with devotional frescoes depicting Saints by Francesco Lola, Giovanni Pietro Falloppi and Pietro Lianori (XV). The window was made by Blessed Fra Giacomo di Ulm designed by Michele di Matteo da Bologna.
20. Chapel of St. Ambrose, formerly of the Marsili, with a fresco in the style of Vivarini (mid-15th century).
21. Chapel of St. Bridget, formerly of the Pepoli: polyptych by Tomas Garelli (1477).
22. Chapel of Our Lady of Peace: Madonna in Istrian stone by Giovanni Ferabech (1394).

== Music ==
Bologna was a principal center of Baroque music in Italy. The musical organisation had been officially instituted by Pope Eugenius IV in 1436; the first regularly paid instrumentalists were added in the late sixteenth century, and in the seventeenth century San Petronio was renowned for its sacred instrumental and choral music, with its two great organs, completed in 1476 by Lorenzo da Prato and 1596 by Baldassarre Malamini, both still in remarkably original condition; the library remains a rich archival repository. Three successive maestri di cappella marked the great age of music at San Petronio: Maurizio Cazzati (1657–71), Giovanni Paolo Colonna (1674–95) and Giacomo Antonio Perti (1696–1756). The current maestro, since 1996, is the harpsichordist Sergio Vartolo who has revitalised the cappella with a series of recordings for Naxos, Tactus, Brilliant Classics and Bongiovanni.

Tenor Giuseppe Marsigli (fl. 1677 – c. 1727) was a singer in San Petronio's choir for 50 years in addition to having a career as an opera singer and as a court musician to the Duke of Mantua.

== Cassini's Meridian Line ==
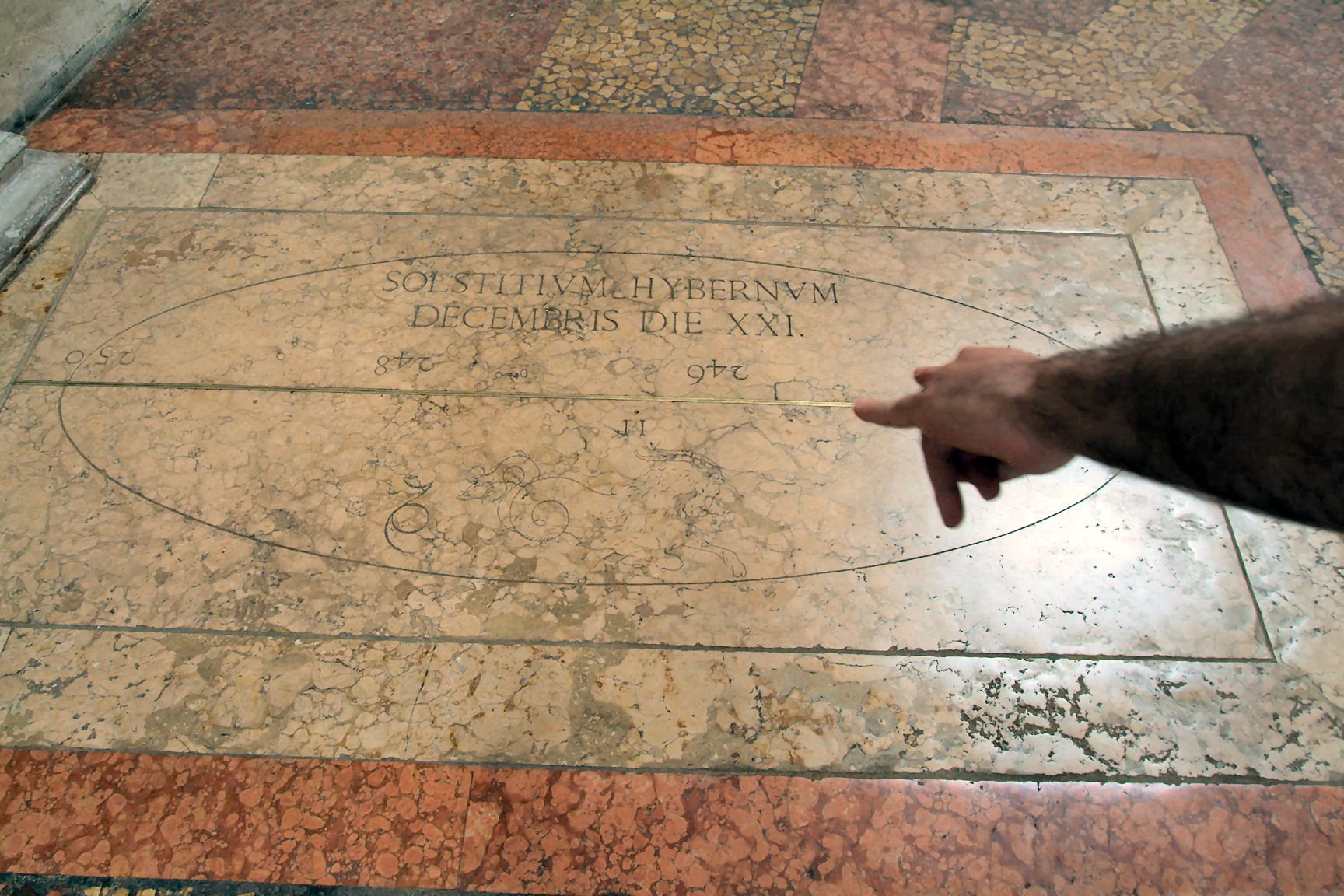
The winter solstice end of the meridian line

The church hosts also a marking in the form of a meridian line inlaid in the paving of the left aisle in 1655; it was calculated and designed by the astronomer Giovanni Domenico Cassini, who was teaching astronomy at the University. A meridian line does not indicate the time: instead, with its length of 66.8 metres (219 ft) it is one of the largest astronomical instruments in the world, allowing measurements that were for the time uniquely precise. The sun light, entering through a 27.07 mm (1.066 in) hole placed at a 27.07 m (88.8 ft) height in the church wall, projects an elliptical image of the sun, which at local noon falls exactly on the meridian line and every day is different as to position and size. The position of the projected image along the line allows to determine accurately the daily altitude of the sun at noon, from which Cassini was able to calculate with unprecedented precision astronomical parameters such as the obliquity of the ecliptic, the duration of the tropical year and the timing of equinoxes and solstices. On the other hand, the size of the projected sun's image, and in particular its rate of variation during the year, allowed Cassini the first experimental verification of Kepler's laws of planetary motion.

Cassini and Domenico Guglielmini published an illustrated account of how the meridian line was accomplished in 1695.

== Terror threat ==
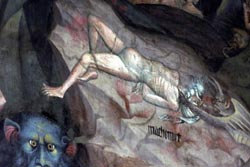
Late Gothic fresco in San Petronio Basilica, depicting Muhammad being tortured in Hell.

In 2002 five men were arrested on suspicions of planning to blow up the basilica. The men were allegedly connected to Al Qaeda. Again in 2006, plans by Islamist terrorists to destroy the Basilica were thwarted by Italian police. The terrorists planned to destroy the church because one of the chapels features a 15th-century fresco, painted by Giovanni da Modena and based on Dante Alighieri's Divine Comedy, depicting Muhammad in the eighth circle of Hell, in a section reserved for religious schismatics, being tortured and devoured by demons.

== See also ==
- Bolognese bell ringing, which was conceived and created in the Basilica's bell tower
- Santa Maria degli Angeli e dei Martiri, whose meridian line Pope Clement XI commissioned to rival Bologna's
- Palazzo dei Banchi
- Palazzo d'Accursio
- Palazzo del Podestà, Bologna
- Palazzo dei Notai

== Sources ==
- Heilbron, J.L. (2001). The sun in the church: cathedrals as solar observatories. Harvard University Press. ISBN 978-0-674-00536-5.
