= Jacopo di Paolo =

Italian painter

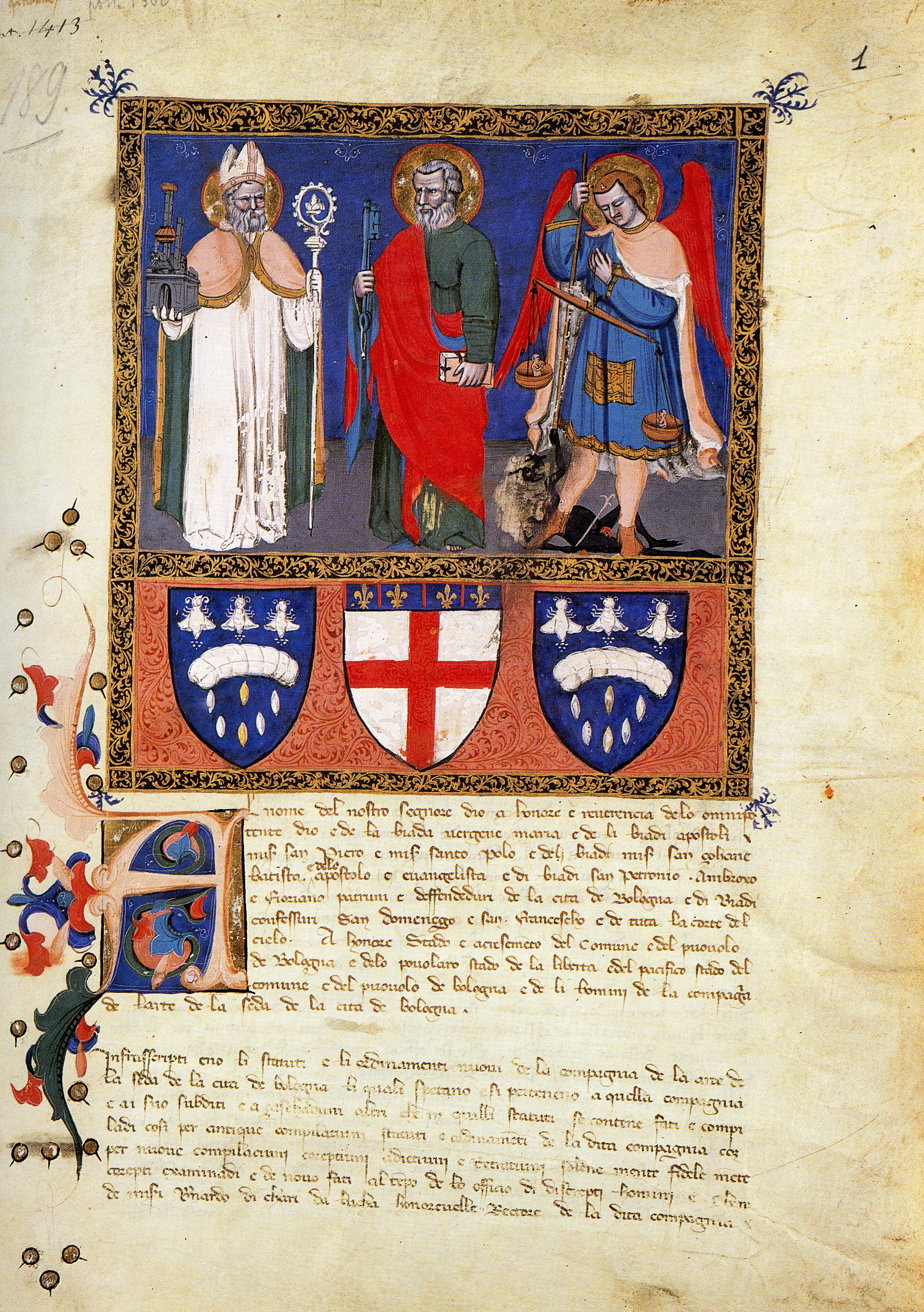
Jacopo di Paolo. Statuti dell'Arte della Seta, 1380 ca, Bologna, Archivio di Stato

Jacopo di Paolo (c. 1345 – c. 1430) was an Italian painter and miniaturist active in Bologna in the fourteenth and fifteenth centuries.

== Biography ==
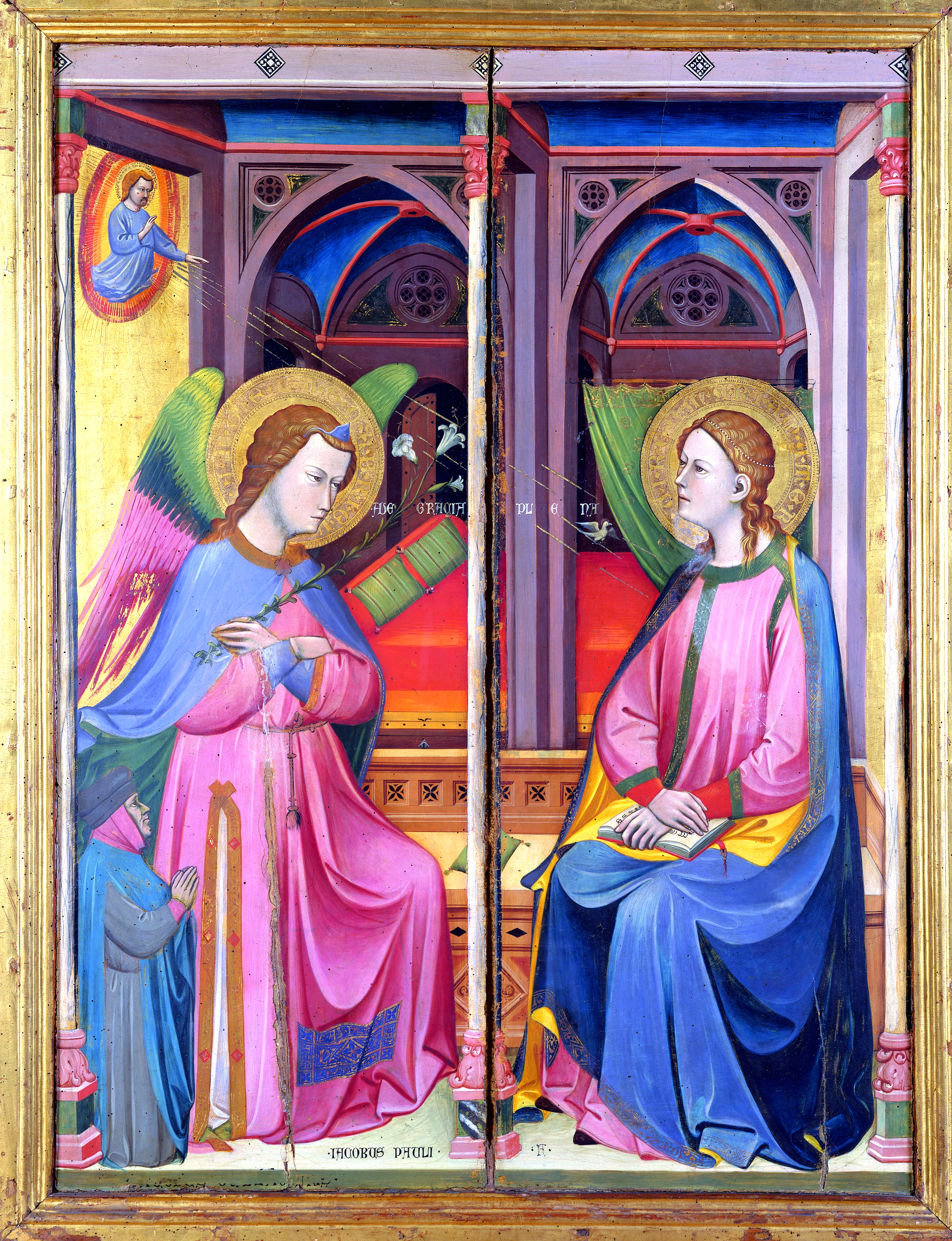
Jacopo di Paolo. L'Annunciazione, 1390-1400, tempera e oro su tavola – Bologna, Collezioni Comunali d'Arte

Jacopo di Paolo, at the beginning of his career, was active at Mezzaratta Church, where he frescoed two Stories of Moses. These pieces were probably based on ideas of Jacopo Avanzi and have a clear influence of the new-giottism and late Gothic of Giovanni da Modena. The strong sense of plasticity in the figures and the rationality of the space system, evident in some works exposed, such as the St. John the Baptist, are the result of a different and new reflection on Giotto's experience. Even though there is a generational gap between Simone and Jacopo, and they both were capable of obtaining important recognition in Bologna, it was Jacopo who also received prestige within the public arena.

The activity of Jacopo was very versatile, as he was engaged at various levels within the fervent political and cultural life of the city. He worked in several prestigious decorative undertakings of the city, sometimes in collaboration with sculptors, such as in the “yard” of San Petronio, launched in 1390. For this, he provided the drawings for the sculptures of the base of the façade, the project for the windows, and the wooden altarpiece in the chapel of the Magi by Bartolomeo Bolognini.

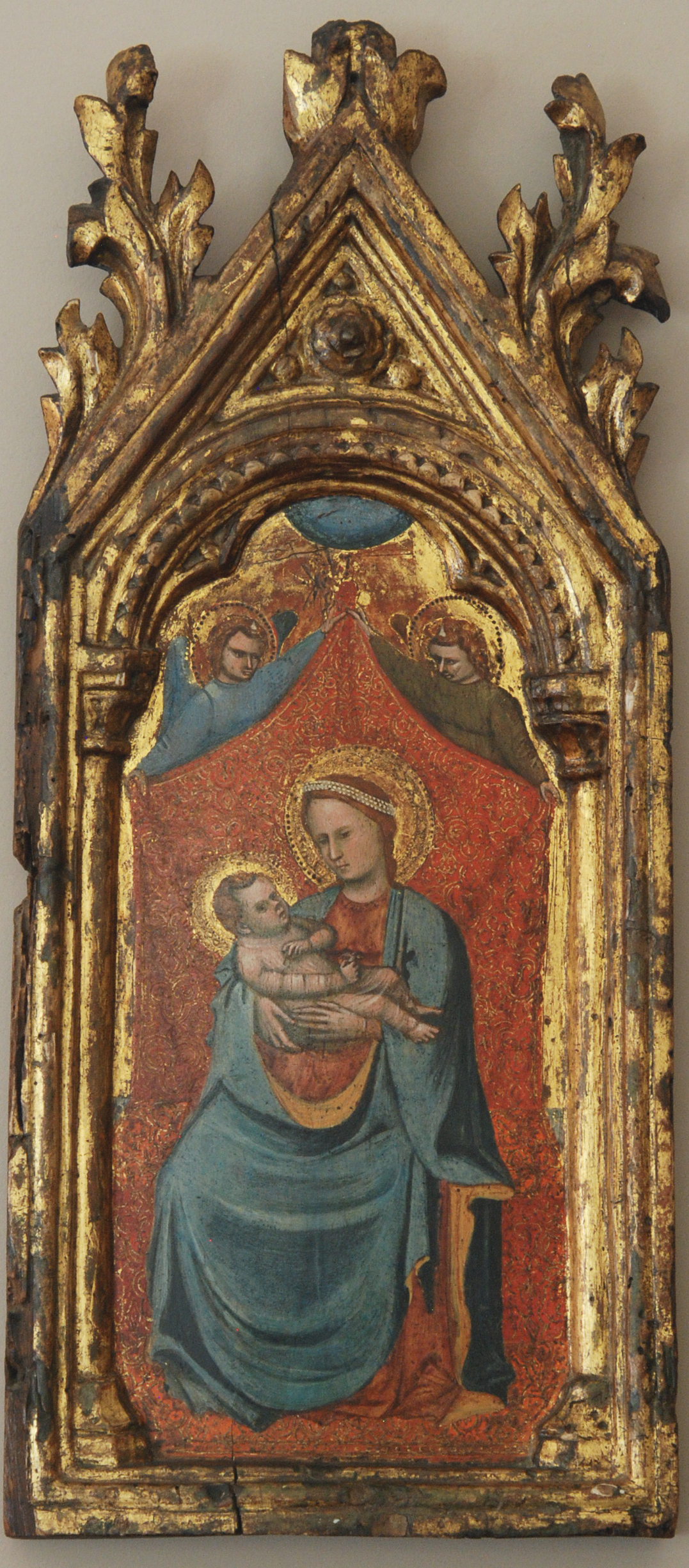
Jacopo di Paolo. Madonna col Bambino in trono, 1370-1380, tempera e oro su tavola – Private collection, deposito presso i Musei Civici d'Arte Antica di Bologna

== Bibliography ==
=== About Jacopo di Paolo ===
- Miniatori e pittori a Bologna. Documenti del secolo XV, a cura di F. Filippini, Roma, 1968.
- Pittura bolognese del '300. Scritti di Francesco Arcangeli, a cura di A. Conti, Bologna, 1978 .
- Per una storia della miniatura a Bologna tra Tre e Quattrocento. Appunti e considerazioni, in Il tramonto del Medioevo a Bologna. Il cantiere di S. Petronio, cura di R. D'Amico e R. Grandi, Bologna, 1987.
- Il polittico Bolognini, a cura di R. D'Amico e R. Grandi.
- Vitale da Bologna e la sua bottega nella chiesa di S. Apollonia a Mezzaratta, a cura di S. Skerl e Del Conte, Bologna 1993.
- Haec sunt statuta. Le corporazioni medioevali nelle miniature bolognesi, a cura di M. Medica, Modena, 1999.
- Un S. Giovanni Battista di J. di P., in Due santi e una musa…, a cura di M. Medica, Bologna, 2001.
