= Palazzo Re Enzo =

Historic palace in Bologna, Italy

Coordinates: 44°29′40.56″N 11°20′33.72″E

Palazzo Re Enzo, Bologna
- Palazzo Re Enzo (Enzio)
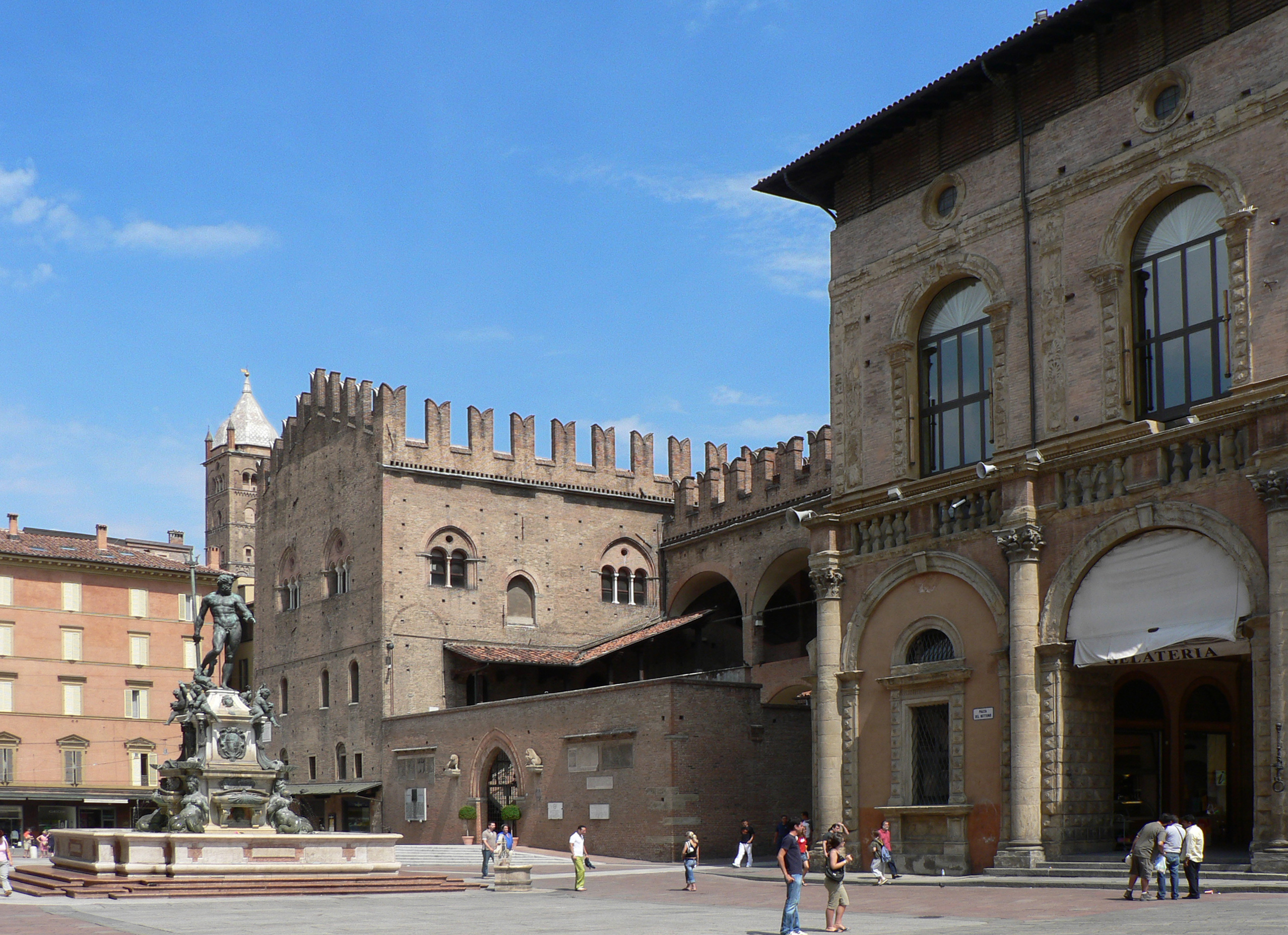
- Picture of the Palazzo Re Enzo in Bologna
- Interactive map of Palazzo Re Enzo, Bologna
- Periods: Middle Age
- Location: Bologna, Italy

History
- Built: 1246

Site notes
- Condition: Restored

Palazzo Re Enzo is a palace located on Piazza del Nettuno, 1 in the historic center of Bologna, northern Italy. The palace takes its name from Enzio of Sardinia, Frederick II's son, who was prisoner here from 1249 until his death in 1272. The palace is presently used to sponsor cultural events and exhibitions.

== History ==
The palace was built between 1244 and 1246 as an extension of the nearby Palazzo del Podestà, which had proven insufficient for the exigences of the Commune of Bologna. It was therefore initially known as Palatium Novum ("New Palace").

Three years after the palace completion, Enzio was captured by the Guelphs at the Battle of Fossalta, and after a short stay in Anzola he was moved here, where he remained until his death. Enzio was allegedly left free within the palace by day, but by night he was kept into a cage hanging from the ceiling. He was also allowed to meet women: in his will he mentions three natural daughters, but a legend talks about a fourth son he had from a peasant, Lucia di Viadagola. The son was called Bentivoglio, from the words "Amore mio, ben ti voglio" that he said to his beloved (meaning "My love, I'm fond of you"), and he would be the ancestor of the Bentivoglio family, later rulers of Bologna.

In 1386 Antonio di Vincenzo finished the Sala dei Trecento ("Hall of the Three-Hundred"), which was to become the city's archive. The last floor was largely renovated in 1771 by Giovanni Giacomo Dotti. The current Gothic appearance dates from the restoration of 1905 due to Alfonso Rubbiani.

On the right of the palace is the access to the chapel of Santa Maria dei Carcerati, where the condemned to death went to. In the first floor was held the Carroccio and the war machines, while in the middle floor were the offices of the praetor and the chapel.

== Sources ==
- Paola Foschi and Francisco Giordano, ed. (2003). Palazzo Re Enzo. Storia e restauri. Bologna: Costa.
