= Palazzo d'Accursio =

Palace in Bologna, Italy

Coordinates: 44°29′39″N 11°20′29″E

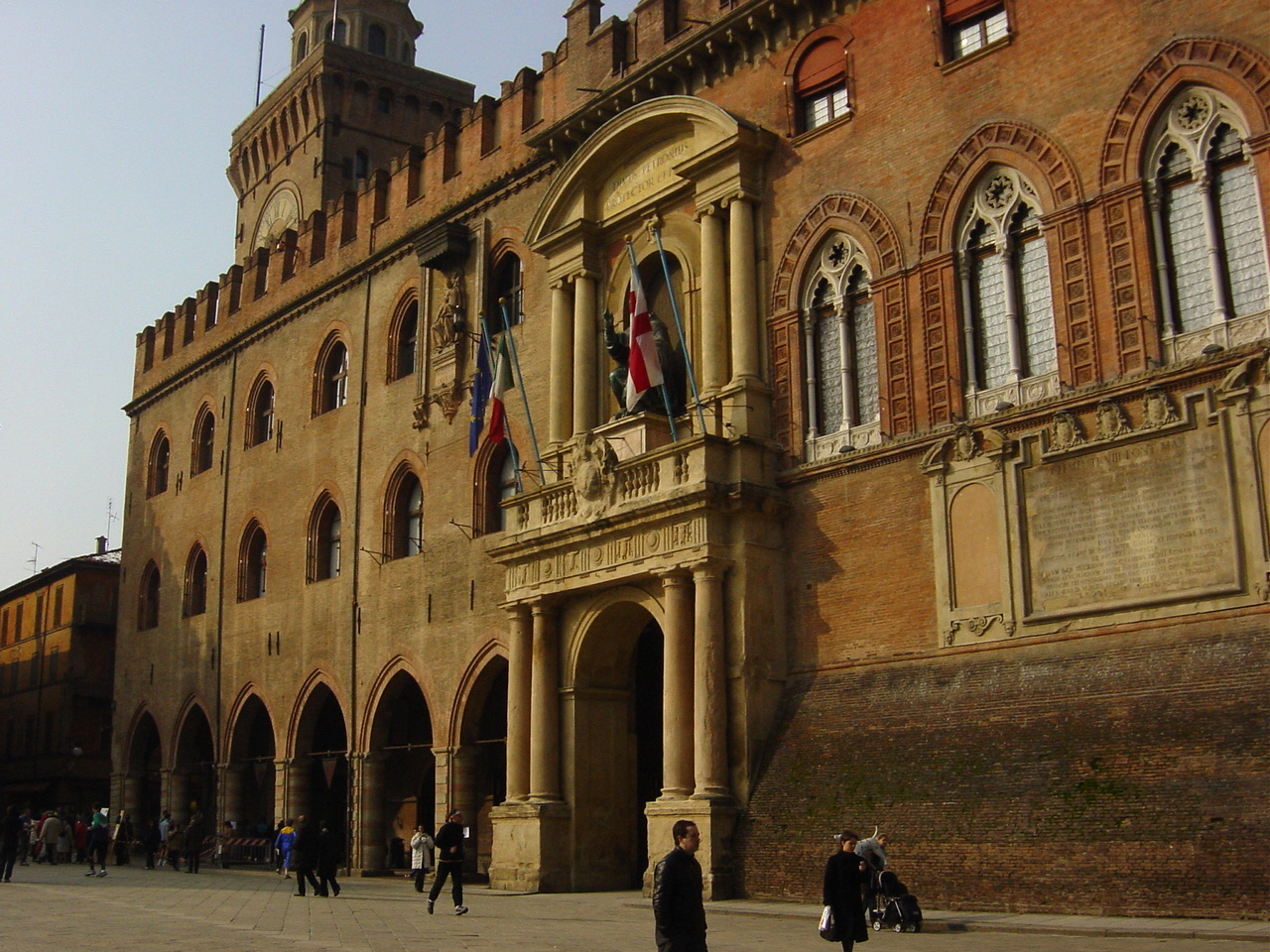
Palazzo d'Accursio

Palazzo d'Accursio (or Palazzo Comunale) is a palace once formulated to house major administrative offices of the city of Bologna, region of Emilia-Romagna, Italy. It is located on the Piazza Maggiore, and is the city's Town Hall. The palace is also home to the Civic Art Collection, with paintings from the Middle Ages to the 19th century; the Museo Morandi, with the works by Giorgio Morandi; and the Biblioteca Salaborsa, the town libraries.

== History ==
The earliest structure of the Palazzo d'Accursio originally began as the residence of the jurist Accursius, but over time, it incorporated and expanded to include adjacent buildings to house civic offices. In 1336 it became the seat of the Anziani ("Elders"), the highest magistrates of the commune, and then seat of the government. In the 15th century it was refurbished under the designs of the architect Fioravante Fioravanti, who added the Clock Tower (Torre d'Accursio). The bell in the tower was installed by Gaspare Nadi. Further reconstruction occurred in the 16th century, after the fall from power of Bentivoglio family in Bologna.

In 1920, in a period of turmoil in Italy caused by the rise of the Italian Socialist Party in the wake of the end of World War I, and the initial violences of the Italian Fascist Party, numerous people were killed while a session of the local council was being held inside the palace. Some were shot by Fascist who had invaded the square in front of the palace, firing against Socialist demonstrators, and some by Socialists themselves, who inadvertently threw hand grenades against their fellows from the palace's windows. Further, when news of the massacre in the square reached the meeting, Socialist politicians shot a member of the Liberal Party who also taking part in the council, killing him, while others were also wounded.

== Art and architecture ==
The façade features a portcullis and a Madonna with Child, a terracotta by Niccolò dell'Arca (1478) in the upper section. Over the portal is a large bronze statue of the Bolognese Pope Gregory XIII (1580). A statue in wood and gilded copper of Pope Boniface VIII, once here, is now in the Medieval Museum.

The Hall of the Communal Council, on the first floor, is where the Bolognese Senate met, and contains a gallery ceiling frescoed with Baroque-style quadratura by Angelo Michele Colonna and Gioacchino Pizzoli (1675–1677). The ceiling depicts the following scenes:

- Minerva (goddess of knowledge)
- Mars (god of war), who, along with Minerva, convinces Fame to trumpet the town's virtues.
- Cybele (Magna Mater Goddess) pointing to the glory of Olympus, which could also be seen as a metaphor of Papal Power.
- Bacchus, Pomona and Ceres, who symbolize the fertile lands of the surrounding countryside.

The Farnese Hall, on the second floor, was rebuilt in 1665 by Cardinal Girolamo Farnese: it was previously known as "Royal Hall", since in 1530, Charles V was crowned King of Italy here with the Iron Crown (the imperial coronation took place, however, in the Basilica of San Petronio). The hall was frescoed with stories of the city from the Middle Ages to the 17th century, by pupils of Francesco Albani. The Chapel has frescoes (1562) by Prospero Fontana.
