= Florian (name) =

- Pronunciation: English: /ˈflɔːriən/ FLOR-ee-ən; French: [flɔʁjɑ̃] Spanish: [floˈɾjan] German: [ˈfloːʁi̯aːn] Polish: [ˈflɔrjan] Hungarian: [ˈfloːriaːn]
- Gender: Male
- Language: French, German, Polish, Hungarian, Spanish, Dutch
- Name day: Germany: May 4 France: May 4 Poland: May 4, May 7, November 5, December 17; Hungary: May 4 Slovakia: May 4

Origin
- Origin: Latin
- Meaning: "Blond; blooming, flowering"
- Region of origin: Roman Empire

Other names
- Variant forms: Floriane (French, feminine)
- Derived: flōrus
- Related names: Florián (Spanish), Flórián (Hungarian), Floriano (Italian and Portuguese), Florianus (Latin), Florencio (Spanish), Fiorino (Italian), Florin (Romanian), Flurin (Romansch), Florian (Albanian)

Florian is a masculine given name borrowed from the ancient Roman name Florianus. The name is derived from Florus, from Latin flōrus (originally "yellow, blond", later "flowering"), related to flāvus ("yellow, blond").

Saint Florian is a patron saint of Poland and Upper Austria. Florian (or a local equivalent) remains a common name in Austria, Germany, Switzerland, Spain, France, the Netherlands, Belgium, and Poland.

== Variants ==
- Florian – German, Polish, French, Romanian
- Floriano – Italian, Portuguese
- Florianus – Latin
- Florián – Spanish
- Flórián – Hungarian
- Florijan/Florjan – Slovene
- Floriane – French
- Florencio – Spanish
- Fiorino – Italian
- Florin / Florian – Romanian
- Flori / Florian – Albanian
- Florinus, Florus – Latin
- Flurin – Romansch
- Флор, Flor – Russian
- Флориан, Florian – Bulgarian

== Given name ==
- Saint Florian, a 4th-century martyr in the Roman Empire, patron of firemen
- Florian Abel, a 16th-century Austrian painter
- Anton Florian of Liechtenstein (1656–1721), an early prince of Liechtenstein
- Florian Abrahamowicz (born 1961), an Austrian priest
- Florian Andrighetto (born 1953), an Australian politician
- Florian Armstrong (born 1971), birth name of Dido, a British singer
- Florian Bague (born 1984), a French football goalkeeper
- Florian Ballhaus (born 1965), a German cinematographer
- Florian Bellaire (born 1985), German politician
- Florian Bellanger (born 1968), a French pastry chef, TV personality
- Florian Berisha (born 1990), a Kosovan football midfielder
- Florian Bertmer, a German illustrator
- Florian Biesik (1849–1926), an Austro-Hungarian Wymysorys linguist
- Florian Bollen, chairman of Great Wheel Corporation and Singapore Flyer
- Florian Boucansaud (born 1981), a French football defender
- Florian Bourrassaud (born 2000), a French table tennis player
- Florian Bouziani (born 1990), a French para-cyclist
- Florian Bruns (born 1979), a German football midfielder
- Florian Côté (1929–2002), a Québécois politician
- Florian Cajori (1859–1930), a Swiss-American historian of mathematics
- Florian Cazalot (born 1985), a rugby union player
- Florian Ceynowa (1817–1881), a Kashubian political activist and linguist
- Florian Chauche (born 1984), French politician
- Florian Chmielewski (1927 - 2024), a Minnesota Senate president
- Florian Clara (born 1988), an Italian luger
- Florian Dan Lăcustă (born 1977), a Romanian footballer
- Florian Johann Deller (1729–1773), an Austrian composer and violinist
- Florian Dick (born 1984), a German football defender
- Florian Dinhopel (born 1987), an Austrian ice hockey player
- Florian Eisath (born 1984), an Italian alpine ski racer
- Florian-Ayala Fauna, an American musician
- Florian Fricke (1944–2001), a German musician
- Florian Fritsch (born 1985), a German golfer
- Florian Fritz (born 1984), a French rugby union footballer
- Florian Fromlowitz (born 1986), a German footballer
- Florian Funk (born 1998), German politician
- Florian Gallenberger (born 1972), a German film director
- Stefan Florian Garczyński (1805–1833), a Polish Romantic poet, a Messianist
- Florian Geyer (Geier) (1490–1525), a Franconian nobleman, diplomat and knight
- Florian Goebel (1972–2008), a German astrophysicist
- Florian Gosch (born 1980), an Austrian beach volleyball player
- Florian Grassl (born 1980), a German skeleton racer
- Florian Gruber (born 1983), a German auto racing driver
- Florian Grzechowiak (1914–1972), a Polish basketball player
- Florian Guay, a Québécois politician
- Florian Habicht (born 1975), a New Zealand film director
- Florian Hart (born 1990), an Austrian footballer
- Florian Havemann (born 1952), the son of East German dissident Robert Havemann
- Florian Hecker, a German electronic music composer
- Florian Heller (born 1982), a German football player
- Johann Florian Heller (1813–1871), an Austrian chemist, a founder of clinical chemistry
- Florian Henckel von Donnersmarck (born 1973), an Austrian-German director and screenwriter
- Florian Hölzl (born 1985), German politician
- Florian Homm (born 1959), a German financier
- Florian Hube (born 1980), a German football player
- Florian Hufsky (1986–2009), an Austrian new media artist, political activist
- Florian Iberer (born 1982), an Austrian ice hockey player
- Florian Jarjat (born 1980), a French football player
- Florian Jenni (born 1980), a Swiss chess player
- Florian Jouanny (born 1992), a French para-cyclist
- Florian Jungwirth (born 1989), a German footballer
- Florian Just (born 1982), a German pair skater
- Florian Kehrmann (born 1977), a German handball player
- Florian Keller (born 1981), a German field hockey player
- Florian Kempf (born 1956), an American football player
- Florian Klein (born 1986), an Austrian football player
- Florian Koch (born 1992), a German basketball player
- Florian Kohfeldt (born 1982), a German football manager
- Florian Kringe (born 1982), a German footballer
- Florian Lampert (1863–1930), an American politician
- Florian Lechner (born 1981), a German football player
- Florian Leopold Gassmann (1729–1774), a German-speaking Bohemian opera composer
- Florian Liegl (born 1983), an Austrian ski jumper
- Florian Lipowitz (born 2000), a German racing cyclist
- Florian Lucchini, a French footballer
- Florian Müller (disambiguation), several people
- Florian Mader (born 1982), an Austrian association football player
- Florian Maier-Aichen (born 1973), a German landscape photographer
- Florian Marange (born 1986), a French football defender
- Florian Marciniak (1915–1944), a Polish scoutmaster
- Florian Marinescu, a Romanian sprint canoer
- Florian Maurice (born 1974), a French former football player
- Florian Mayer (born 1983), a German tennis player
- Florian Metz (born 1985), an Austrian footballer
- Florian Meyer (born 1968), a German football referee
- Florian Micheler (born 2005), Austrian footballer
- Florian Mohr (born 1984), a German footballer
- Florian Myrtaj (born 1976), an Albanian footballer
- Florian Neuhold (born 1993), an Austrian footballer
- Florian Philippot (born 1981), a French politician
- Florian Picasso (born 1990), a French DJ and descendant of Pablo Picasso
- Florian Pilkington-Miksa (1950–2021), an English drummer
- Florian Pittiș (1943–2007), a Romanian actor
- Florian Pop, a Romanian mathematician
- Florian Porcius (1816–1906), Austro-Hungarian Romanian botanist
- Florian Prantl, an Austrian luger
- Florian Quintilla (born 1988), French rugby league footballer
- Hieronim Florian Radziwiłł (1715–1760), a Polish-Lithuanian szlachcic
- Florian Riedel (born 1990), a German footballer
- Florian Roost (born 1989), a Swiss ice dancer
- Florian Rousseau (born 1974), a French track cyclist
- Florian Rus (born 1989), a Romanian singer and songwriter
- Florian Schabereiter (born 1991), an Austrian ski jumper
- Florian Schäfer (born 1986), German politician
- Florian Schneeberger (1971–2026), an Austrian sailor
- Florian Schneider (1947–2020), a German electronic musician
- Florian Schönbeck (born 1974), a German decathlete
- Florian Schulz, a German photographer
- Florian Schwarthoff (born 1968), a German hurdler
- Florian Seidl (born 1979), an Austrian vehicle designer
- Florian Seitz (born 1982), a German sprinter
- Florian Sénéchal (born 1993), a French racing cyclist
- Florian Siekmann (born 1995), German politician
- Florian Silbereisen (born 1981), a German musician and television presenter
- Florian Siwicki (1925–2013), a Polish politician
- Florian Skilang Temengil (born 1986), a Palauan wrestler
- Florian Slotawa (born 1972), a German conceptual artist
- Florian Stablewski (1841–1906), a Polish priest and politician
- Florian Stahel (born 1985), a Swiss footballer
- Florian Stalder (born 1982), a Swiss racing cyclist
- Florian Ștefănescu-Goangă (1881–1958), a Romanian psychologist
- Florian Stengg (born 1989), an Austrian skier
- Florian Sturm (born 1982), an Austrian footballer
- Florian Süssmayr (born 1963), a German painter
- Florian Święs (1939–2015), a Polish geobiologist
- Florian Thauvin (born 1993), a French football player
- Florian Thorwart (born 1982), a German football player
- Florian Tschögl, an Austrian "righteous among the Nations"
- Florian Uhlig (born 1974), a German pianist
- Florian Ungler (died 1536), a Bavarian printer
- Florian Vermeersch (born 1999), a Belgian racing cyclist
- Florian Vijent (1961–1989), a Dutch-Surinamese football goalkeeper
- Florian Vogel (disambiguation): several people
- Florian Wanner (born 1978), a German judoka
- Florian Wiek (born 1972), a German pianist
- Florian Willet (1977–2025), a German academic, author and pro-euthanasia activist
- Ernst Florian Winter (1923–2014), an Austrian-American historian and political scientist
- Florian Wirtz (born 2003), a German football player
- Florian ZaBach (1918–2006), an American musician and TV personality
- Florian Zeller (born 1979), a French novelist and playwright
- Florian Zellhofer (born 1988), an Austrian footballer
- Florian Zimmer, a German magician
- Florian Znaniecki (1882–1958), a Polish sociologist

== Surname ==
- Aaron Florian (1805–1887), a Romanian historian
- Austin Florian (born 1994), an American skeleton racer
- Dawid Florian (born 1982), a Polish footballer
- Federico De Florian (1921–2003), an Italian skier
- Filip Florian (born 1968), a Romanian author
- Friedrich Karl Florian (1894–1975), the Gauleiter of Düsseldorf in Nazi Germany
- Friedrich St. Florian (1932–2024), an Austrian-American architect
- Jean-Pierre Claris de Florian (1755–1794), a French poet and romance writer
- Josef Florian (1873–1941), a Czech publisher and translator
- Juan José Florian (born c. 1982), a Colombian para cyclist
- Kenny Florian (born 1976), a Peruvian-American mixed martial artist
- Mircea Florian (philosopher) (1888–1960), a Romanian philosopher
- Mircea Florian (born 1949), a Romanian singer and multimedia artist
- Nicolas Florian (1969–2025), a French politician
- Rick Florian (born 1962), an American musician, songwriter and producer
- Teodor Florian (born 1899, date of death unknown), a Romanian rugby union footballer

== Fictional characters ==
- Florian, the male protagonist of Pokémon Scarlet and Violet
- Florian, the protagonist of Florian: The Emperor’s Stallion by Felix Salten
- Florian, the protagonist of Gorgeous Carat manga
- Florian, a prominent character in the novel Cyteen by C. J. Cherryh
- Florian Brandner, on the German soap opera Verbotene Liebe
- Florian Cravic, also known as Bernie Crane, a character in the video game Grand Theft Auto IV
- Florean Fortescue, a shopkeeper in the Harry Potter universe
- Florian Reiss, in the manga Attack on Titan
- Prince Florian, a character appearing in Super Mario Bros. Wonder
- Prince Florian, a character in the novel Clockwork
- Florian Verisey, a character in the fantasy series "The Druid and the Dragon Queen" by Esmeray Sultan

== See also ==
- Florian (disambiguation)
