= Floriano =

Floriano may refer to:

== People ==
=== Surname ===
- Francisco Floriano (born 1959), Brazilian politician
- Roberto Floriano (born 1986), Italian footballer

=== Given name ===
- Floriano Abrahamowicz (born 1961), Austrian priest
- Floriano Ambrosini (1557–1621), Italian architect and engineer
- Floriano Buroni, 17th-century Italian engraver
- Floriano Ferramola (c. 1478–1528), Italian painter
- Floriano Martello (born 1952), Italian speed skater
- Floriano Peixoto (1839–1895), Brazilian president
- Floriano Peixoto Correia (1903–1938), Brazilian football coach and player
- Floriano Peixoto (actor) (born 1959), Brazilian actor
- Floriano Spiess (born 1967), Brazilian wrestler
- Floriano Vanzo (born 1994), Belgian footballer
- Floriano Vaz (né Vas, 1963–1986), Indian writer and activist

== Other uses ==
- Floriano, Piauí, Brazil
- Roman Catholic Diocese of Floriano, based in the city in Piauí
- Floriano (horse), a horse ridden by Steffen Peters in dressage
- San Floriano, a hamlet in Deutschnofen, South Tyrol, Italy

== See also ==
- Floriano Peixoto (disambiguation)
- Floriano River (disambiguation)
- Florian (disambiguation)
- Florianópolis, the capital of Santa Catarina, Brazil
