= Hube (name) =

Hube is a surname and given name. As a surname, it can also be spelled "Hübe" (German).

Notable people with the surname include:

- Constanza Hube (born 1987), Chilean lawyer
- Douglas P. Hube (born 1941), Canadian astronomer
- Florian Hube (born 1980), German football player
- Hans-Valentin Hube (1890–1944), German soldier
- Jörg Hube (1943–2009), German actor and director
- Michał Jan Hube (1737–1807), Polish physicist and educator
- Rick Hube (1947–2009), Vermont politician
- Romuald Hube (1803–1890), Polish law scholar

Notable people with the given name include:

- Hube Wagner (1891–1979), American football player
