= Hube =

Hube may refer to:

- 65657 Hube, asteroid
- Hube (name)
- Hube (hills), hill range in the Leine Uplands of Germany
- Hube Rural LLG, in Papua New Guinea
