= Tschögl =

Tschögl is a surname. Notable people with the surname include:

- Florian Tschögl, Austrian Righteous Among the Nations
- John Tschogl (born 1950), American basketball player
