= History of the Jews in Łęczna =

The history of the Jews in Łęczna, Poland is first recorded and dated to 1501. The Jewish community of the town was evident and stable until the holocaust, after which it ceased to exist. The Glincman family from Wlodawa sent some family members to live there in the late 1800s to widen their business to surrounding towns. Nowadays monuments and buildings are still visible and commemorated in town.

== 16th to 18th centuries ==
A century afterwards, in the years 1668, 1678 and 1681, Leczna hosted the annual gathering of the Council of Four Lands, the Jewish leadership of Eastern Europe between 1580 and 1764. Having that, Leczna can be considered a central Jewish location in the Polish territories during the second half of the second millennium.

Like other Polish Jews, the Jews living in Leczna were mostly craftsmen such as shoemakers, tailors and butchers. In 1674, the Jews constituted 33% of the 547 individuals living in town. Shortly after the Jewish community had gotten a permit to establish their own synagogue, which still stands on the same place as in the 17th century. The Jewish community of Leczna enjoyed a relatively free and unrestricted everyday life, unlike other towns in eastern Europe and Poland specifically. Although some restrictions were imposed on the production of liquor (Herszek Kodenski, for example, was allowed to produce 400 cauldrons of Vodka, having to pay an annual fee of 400 zloti), owning of pubs, distilleries and other alcoholic facilities was allowed, unlike in other places, and the Jews had rights of to vote for every forth mayor who came from a Christian family. The decision to tax vodka in 1777 made the Jews earn a bigger income, and eventually gained the community the ability to raise a community trust.

== 19th century ==
By 1803, 38% of the town 1,465 inhabitants were Jews (563 individuals), but by 1840 - this percentage had doubled itself reaching 64% of the total population (1,754 Jews among 2,715 citizens). In 1846 the Jewish quarter was almost entirely burnt down, as happened also to the synagogue. During that time, the town was one of the most central centers of Hasidic Judaism in Poland, and known in Hebrew and Yiddish as "Hassidut Lanteshna" ("חסידות לנטשנה"), founded in town by Rabbi Isaac, a student of the famous Yaakov Yitzchak of Lublin. Disputes over the election of a main community Rabbi had erupted regularly during the 19th century, between the Hasidic and Orthodox Jews living in town.

During the 1864 Polish January Uprising against the Russian Empire, one of the captured rebels was lieutenant Rachman Borenstejn, a Jewish resident of Leczna, who was eventually killed.

== 20th century ==
The Jewish community numbered 2,019 (63% of the total population in 1921). 1,617 Jews lived in Liczna in 1922. The community owned a synagogue, a mikveh, a prayer-house, a pre-burial house and a cemetery. In 1936, eight people were chosen to the general municipal council, showing just how dominant was the Jewish community in town. While 1889 Poles were living in town in 1935, the Jewish community reached to a number peak of 2273.

With the Nazi occupation, Poles and Jews were forced under a curfew. Jews were also forced to wear a yellow star on their chests and later on their arms. Jews were no longer admitted to Caffe's, hotels and bars. As a results of the Nazi regulation forced upon Polish Jews by Reinhard Heydrich, a Jewish Ghetto was established in Liczna and all Jews were forced to move into its borders. After the Ghetto was established, the supervision was given to Ukrainians who were trained by the Nazi's in Trawniki concentration camp. Nevertheless, a segregation fence between the Jewish and Polish communities was constructed not before 1942. In January 1940, a local Judenrat was established by the Nazi's, consisting of 12 members. Icek Chaim Fruchtman was the head of the Judenrat. A Jewish local mutual help committee was established in July 1940. Icek Zylberstein, A local, was the chairman of the committee. A health service was founded in 1940 and a public kitchen in 1941.

Between Meach and July 1942, Jews from Czechoslovakia and Bohemia arrived to the Liczna Ghetto. The population of the Ghetto grew from 2,191 in March 1941 to 3000 in October 1942.

The first transport to the Sobibor extermination camp was on October 25, 1942. About 3,000 people, mostly elderly and kids, were sent away. In September 1943 the Germans killed 23 Jews at Kanałowa Street and 50 Jews at Łańcuchowa Street. 970 Jews were killed by the Nazis during Yom Kippur holiday in 1943. Wojciech Wieczorek, the author of "Szkice z prowincji" ["Memories from the province"], describes the event: "Next to the synagogue there was quite a large square, with a ravine on its one side. The ravine was grooved a long time ago by rains and thawing snow. The ravine went down to the Lublin road, near the Świnka River Valley. It was the place where Jews in the rows of four each were walked from the ghetto. Afterwards, a machine gun did its job. Jews were killed not only in groups but also individually. It was done during the later phase of the murders, while searching for those who hid in the recesses in the ghetto. Moreover, the wounded who tried to hide were also hit by death blows. For the sake of certainty, the Germans threw hand grenades into the pit where dead bodies lay. Then, Jewish policemen were ordered to cover the bodies with a layer of ground." During the Holocaust, about 2,500 Jews who lived in Leczna prior to the war, were killed by the Nazis. Most of them were sent to Sobibor on three deportations - the first one on April or May 1942 (200 people), on October 23, 1942 (3,000 people) and on April 29, 1943 (300 people).

After the holocaust, the Jewish community of Leczna ceased to exist. Some survivors and relatives of murdered residents have reported to Yad Vashem about their ceased relatives. This documentation can be found online.

== Places ==
=== The great synagogue and the museum ===
Located on 19 Boznicza street, the great synagogue in Leczna was erected around 1655, after the Archbishop of Kraków granted permission to the Jews of Leczna to establish their own synagogue in town. The synagogue was burnt twice, in 1846 and 1881. He was then rebuilt, though he was hit again during World War II. Between 1939 and 1944 the synagogue was used by the Nazis as a storehouse. After a new synagogue was built nearby, the building became a museum for the town history, including Judaica and Jewish-related artifacts. In September 1961, a plaque was put on the outer wall of the building commemorating its former use and the annihilated Jewish community that used to live there. On July 4, 2014, the synagogue was sprayed in graffiti containing anti-Jewish remarks. (For more information about the synagogue see external links).

Adam Dylewski in his guide entitled "In the Footsteps of Polish Jews" describes the museum in Łęczna: "Exposure system based on Jewish ritual cycle - from New Year (1 Tishri, September–October), by Yom Kippur, Sukkot, Chanukah and Purim until after Pesach. There are ritual objects (vessels for ritual washing of hands, Shabbat candlesticks, Kiddush cups, dishes on the etrog - citrus fruit, Hanukkah lamps, plates and kufelki Seder), costume pieces (m . al. tallit from Chisinau, the gift of a descendant of the well-known family Leczna Geldmanów). strong point of the exhibition is an original part on everyday life. There are, among others, Copper utensils, snuff, wedding invitations, business cards, and even an authentic bottles of the famous pesachówce Haberfeld of Auschwitz. In stark unique in Polish exhibitions Judaic is the original costume of a Jewish Ostrowiec, consisting of serdaczka and a skirt".

A commemorative plaque is stated on the outer wall of the synagogue. It was embed in September 1961 in honor of the town Jews killed by the Nazi regime. The executions took place on the scarp next to the synagogue, and their bodies were also buried there.

=== The small synagogue ===
Next to the old synagogue stands a smaller and newer one, on Boznicza 21. The synagogue was built at the beginning of the 19th century and at first hosted the community schools and a prayer space. As happened with the old synagogue, the new synagogue was also burnt down in 1846 and 1881. It was re-built only in 1859 and the second time in 1894. After the holocaust, the building did not serve the non-existent Jewish community but functioned as an office for "Drewno" Lublin cooperative work organization. In 1979 the building housed offices of the textile organization, but in 1989 it was abandoned until it was renovated in 1992. The building is being used these days as a library. Only one piece of furniture survived from the time the building was a synagogue - the hand washing basin. For more information about the synagogue see its webpage.

=== The Jewish cemetery of Leczna ===
The Jewish cemetery cemetery on Pasternik street is dated back at least to 1639, and the last burial took place at 1942. Before World War II the cemetery was surrounded by a brick wall. During the 1950s the synagogue was liquidated and planted in trees that left no trace of tombstones. An effort of restoring the cemetery was started in 1984, and a number of tombstones were recovered and can still be found in the regional museum of Leczna.

== Known community leaders in Leczna ==
Community leaders include:

- Szlomo Jehud Leib Łęczne - the disciple of Yaakov Yitzchak of Lublin. A Hasid who founded the Hasidic Jewish community in Leczna that became prominent in the general Jewish community of the town during the 19th century.
- Joszua Lejb Ostrowski - the son of Tzadik Szlomo Leib Leczne, served as the community Rabbi between 1843 and 1856. His election triggered a conflict between the Orthodox and the Hasidic Jews in Leczna.
- Chaim Boruch Kowartowski - Became the town rabbi in 1856, after he left the same role in the town of Raciaz. Rabbi Kowatrowski died and buried in Leczna in 1885. His relatives were later killed during the holocaust.
- Chaim Szyja Biderman - after Rabbi Kowatrowski's death in 1885, the community had no official Rabbi, making Chaim Szyja Biderman - a member of the community trustees authority to fulfill the role until 1889.
- Lipa Ringelhajm - Became the community Rabbi and angered the community by asking to raise his pay. Further accusations accused him of fulfilling the role for the money and not for the essence of it. The community took these accusation to the Russian officials - the governor of Lubartow County. It is possible that due to the fact that the main accusers were Hassidim, who were hostile to the Russian rule, the governor favored Ringelhejm, who was loyal to the authorities. In 1892 Ringelhajm was charged once again, but for exploiting money. He was found guilty and lost his role in 1893.
- Lejzor – Izrael Kirszenbaum - After the dismissal of Ringelhajm, Rabbi Kirszenbaum was chosen in the elections for the role, by receiving 87 out of the total 112 votes. He served as the community Rabbi until 1907. Rabbi Kirszenbaum was sent to the gas chambers in Belzec in 1942.
- Henoch Gringlas - Kirszenbaum son-in-law Henoch Gringlas succeeded him when Kirszenbaum was sent to his next role. Gringlas was accused for neglecting the community Rabbi duties such as participating in local circumcisions and documentations of births. As a result, he was eventually replaced by another Rabbi.
- Rachmil Bromberg - Bromberg succeeded Gringals in 1906. As a non-native to Liczna, he moved there with his wife, which was the granddaughter of former local Rabbi Kowartowski. When he moved to Leczna, Gringlas was still the community Rabbi. With Bromberg's becoming a key figure in the community, Gringlas tried to force him out of town. The dispute eventually reached the governor of Lublin, who decided to leave the decision to the chief Rabbinate of Warsaw, which rolled in favor of Bromberg and made him chief Rabbi. Bromberg was the last community Rabbi of Liczna. He was killed by the Nazis during the holocaust.
- Icek Chaim Frochtman - Head of the Liczna Ghetto Judenrat during the Holocaust.

== Organizations ==
A few Jewish organizations have been active through the course of history of the Jewish community in Leczna.

- Bund- a branch of the General Jewish Labour Bund in Poland was active in Leczna since World War I.
- Orthodox Jewish Organization - a branch was active in Lecnza since 1919.
- Poale Zion - A branch of the Marxist-Zionist organization was active since the late 1920s.
- Revisionist Zionist Organization - A branch of the right-winged Zionist organization was established in Leczna during the 1930s.
- Central Jewish Union of Jewish craftsmen - a branch of the non-political Jewish union was active in town.

== Education and culture ==
- Leczna Jewish library - established in 1918 by Sztrejcher Henryk, the library organized cultural events on Jewish holidays such as a Purim ball and Chanukah games. During Chanukah 1920 (December 11), the library hosted a poetry meeting.
- Cheder - nine Cheder classrooms operated in Leczna during World War I. One Cheder operated during the holocaust, and the teachers were Benjamin Samen and Herszek Lejderman.
- Bejt Jaakow Jewish school for girls - an elementary Jewish school for girls was situated on Zielona St. Josef Balter, Sztejnberg Szulim and Cyrla Szlomowicz.

== See also ==
- History of the Jews in Poland
- History of the Jews in Brody
- History of the Jews in Gdańsk
- History of the Jews in Kalisz
- History of the Jews in Łuków
