= Statute of Kalisz =

1264 decree by the Duke of Greater Poland

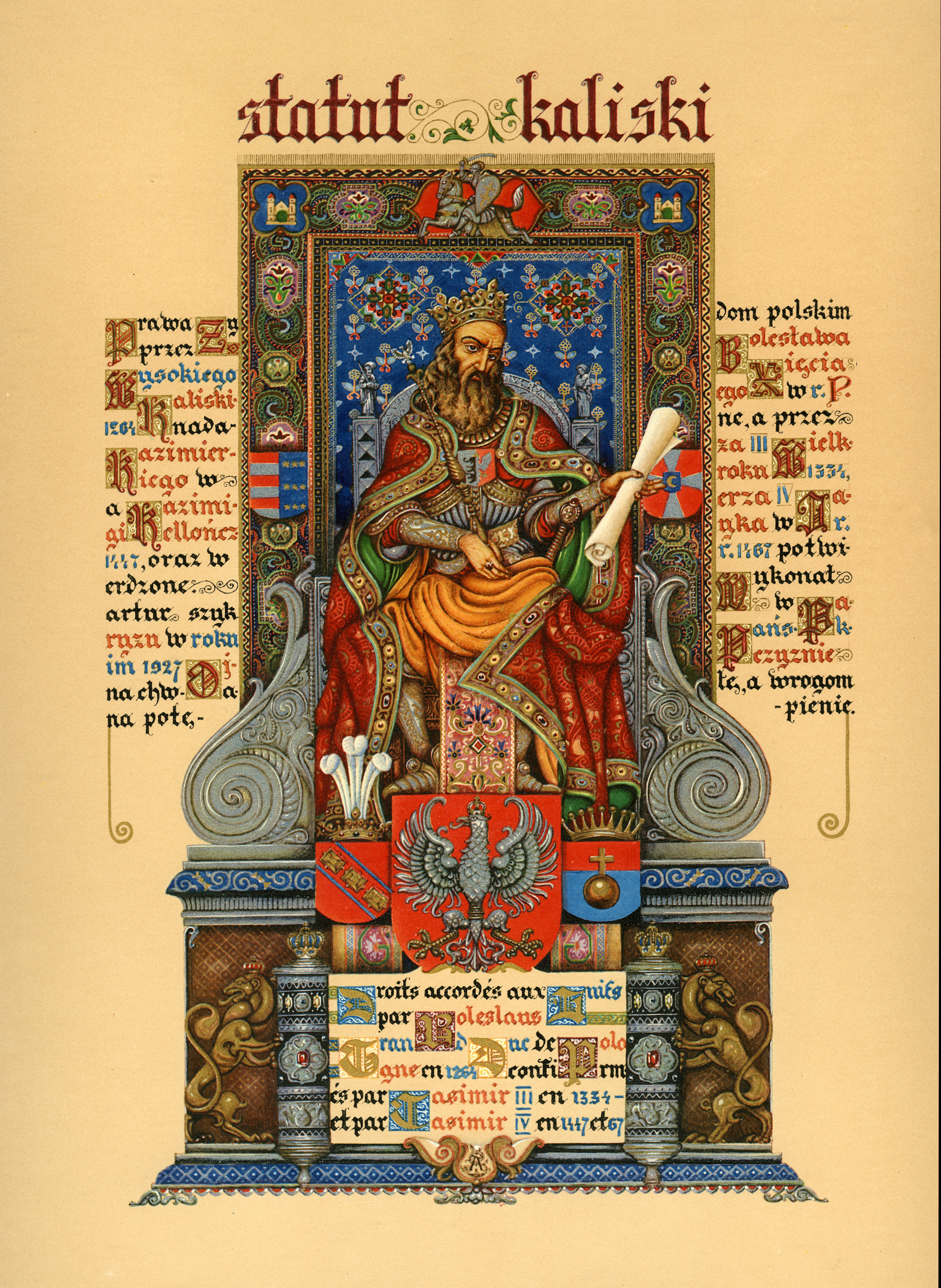
Statute of Kalisz frontispiece, by Arthur Szyk (1927)

The General Charter of Jewish rights known as the Statute of Kalisz, and the Kalisz Privilege, granted Jews in the Middle Ages some protection against discrimination in Poland compared to other places in Europe. These rights included exclusive jurisdiction over Jewish matters to Jewish courts, and established rules of evidence for criminal matters involving Christians and Jews.

The statute was issued by the Duke of Greater Poland Bolesław the Pious on September 8, 1264 in Kalisz. After the unification of Poland, the statute was then ratified by some subsequent Polish Kings: Casimir the Great in 1334, Casimir IV in 1453, and Sigismund I in 1539. This was in contrast to other rulers in Western and Southern Europe at the time who forced Jews to emigrate: England in 1290, France in 1306, Spain in 1492.

Polish Jews appreciated the opportunities Poland provided them and significantly contributed to its development. Their loyalty was also important to the ruler. After the establishment of the Polish–Lithuanian Commonwealth, the role of Jews as bankers and lenders was important. The weak tax system often could not provide sufficient funds for the functioning of the state (the nobility paid almost no taxes).

Jewish subjects in Poland were freemen allowed to trade, rather than serfs, and so further enjoyed the country's religious toleration codified by the Warsaw Confederation of 1573.

The Polish aristocracy developed a unique social contract with Jews, who operated as arendators running businesses such as mills and breweries, and certain bureaucratic tasks to the exclusion of non-Jews, especially tax collection. After Poland expanded into Eastern Orthodox Ukraine, the introduction of the system was a partial cause of the Cossacks' antisemitic and anti-Catholic Khmelnytsky Uprising of 1648.

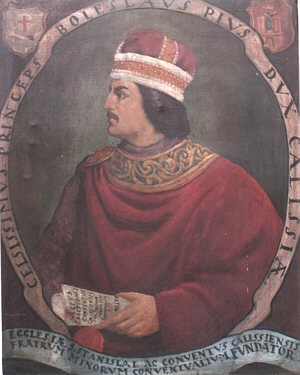
Bolesław the Pious from the Piast dynasty, who issued the Statute of Kalisz

== Excerpts ==
Following are abridged and translated excerpts from the 46 clauses of the Statute of Kalisz:

1. ...if any Christian should accuse any of the Jews in any matter whatsoever, even a criminal matter, he shall not be admitted to testimony except with two good Christians and also with two good Jews.

2. ... If any Christian shall sue a Jew, asserting that he has pawned securities with him, and the Jew denies it, then if the Christian refuses to accept the simple word of the Jew, the Jew by taking oath must be free of the Christian.

10. ...whatever case arises because of discord or contention among Jews, no one should judge it except their own elders...

13. ... if – Heaven forbid – any Christian kills one of the Jews... such a Christian ... must be punished with the imposition of death

17. ...Any Jew may freely and securely walk or ride without any let or hindrance in our realm. They shall pay customary tolls just as other Christians do, and nothing else.

18. But if it becomes necessary for the Jews, in accordance with their custom, to take a dead Jew or Jewess from one city to another city or province, then the toll-collector ... must not dare to exact tolls...

39. This section sets a high bar for accusations of blood libel, "which the Statutes of Pope Innocent teach us that in such matters they are not culpable"...

46. ...every merchant... must sell alike to Christian and Jew...

== Accusations of forgery ==
Romuald Hube analyzed source documents and claimed that both the original and its authenticated copies could not be found, leading to his conclusion that the text was a forgery from the 1400s composed for political purposes. This view is not confirmed by contemporary scientists.

== 20th-century editions ==
In the 1920s, Polish-Jewish artist and activist Arthur Szyk (1894–1951) illuminated the Statute of Kalisz in a cycle of 45 watercolor and gouache miniature paintings. In addition to the original Latin, Szyk translated the text of the Statute into Polish, Hebrew, Yiddish, Italian, German, English, and Spanish. In 1929, Szyk's Statute miniatures were exhibited throughout Poland, namely in Łódź, Warsaw, Kraków, and Kalisz. With support from the Polish government, selections of the Statute miniatures were exhibited in Geneva in 1931, once again in Poland as part of a 14-city tour in 1932, in London in 1933, in Toronto in 1940, and in New York in 1941 and then, without government patronage, in New York in 1944, 1952, and 1974–75. In 1932, the Statute of Kalisz was published by Éditions de la Table Ronde de Paris as a collector's luxury limited edition of 500. Szyk's original miniatures are now in the holdings of the Jewish Museum (New York).

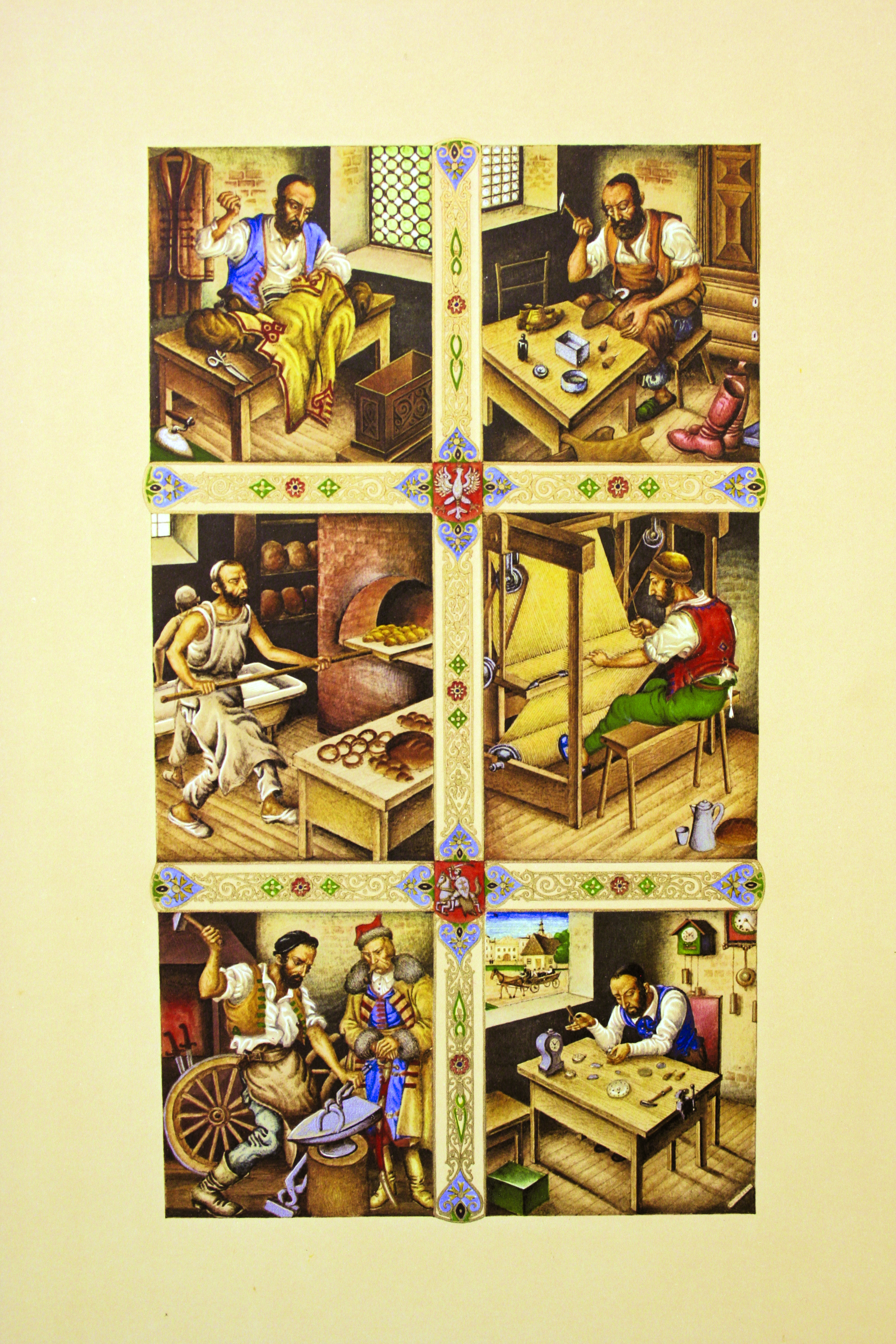
Jewish Craftsmen and Tradesmen (1927)

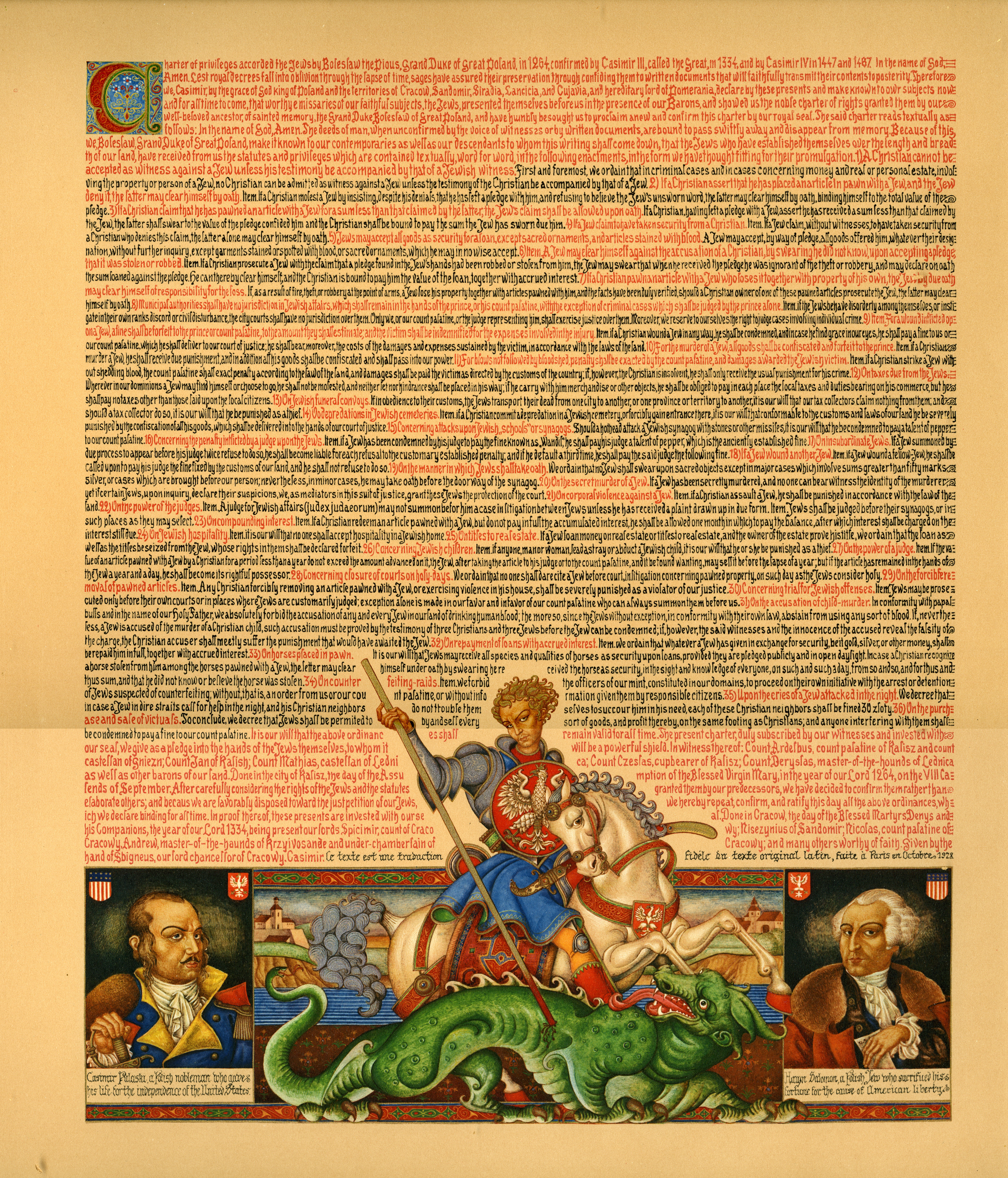
English-language page (1927)

In 1993, Thomas Macadoo translated the Statute from Latin to English based on text from an 1892 German book, Die General-Privilegien der Polnischen Judenschaft. He believed that text was "derived from the autograph of 1264", and included additions made in 1334, 1453 and 1539.

== See also ==
- History of the Jews in Kalisz
- Warsaw Confederation
- Religious toleration
- Human rights in Poland
