= Floriano River =

There are two rivers named Floriano River in Brazil:

- Floriano River (Paraíba)
- Floriano River (Paraná)

== See also ==
- Floriano (disambiguation)
