= Floriano Peixoto (disambiguation) =

Floriano Peixoto (1839–1895) was a Brazilian president.

Floriano Peixoto may also refer to:

- Floriano Peixoto (actor) (born 1959), Brazilian actor
- Floriano Peixoto Vieira Neto (born 1954), Brazilian military
- Floriano Peixoto, Rio Grande do Sul, a municipality
- Praça Floriano Peixoto, a plaza in Rio de Janeiro
