= Sankt Florian (disambiguation) =

Sankt Florian may refer to:

== People ==
- Saint Florian (Sankt Florian), Austrian Christian saint

== Places in Austria ==
- Sankt Florian, municipality of Upper Austria
- Groß Sankt Florian, municipality of Styria
- Sankt Florian am Inn, municipality of Upper Austria

== See also ==
- Florian (disambiguation)
