= History of the Jews in Kalisz =

Kalisz
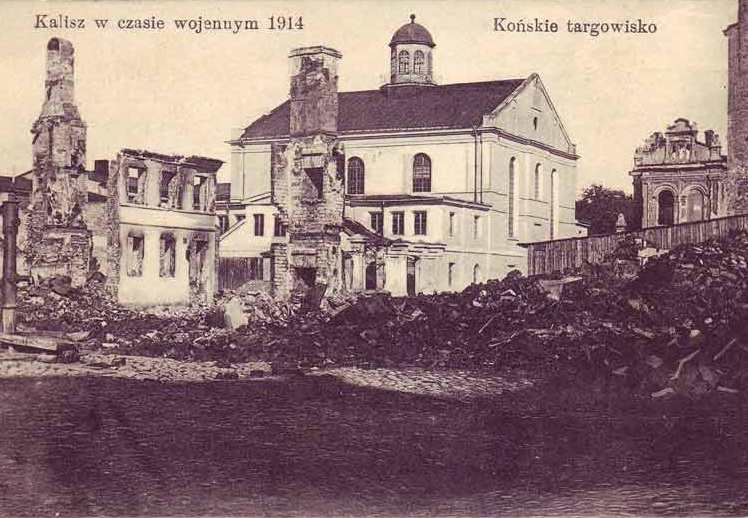
- Grand Synagogue in Kalisz, 1914 behind fresh ruins of World War I

- History of the Jews in Kalisz
- Coordinates: 51°45′27″N 18°4′48″E
- Country: Poland
- Established: 1264

Located in the Poznań province west of Łódź, Kalisz was for centuries a border town between Poland and Germany. The oldest city in Poland, Kalisz also played a pivotal role in Polish Jewish history: in 1264, Bolesław the Pious, ruler of the western part of Poland (Wielkopolska), was the first to grant a charter to the local Jewish community, giving them settlement rights, legal protection, and certain religious and financial freedoms. This "Statute of Kalisz" was extended to the whole country by King Casimir the Great and expanded by later Polish rulers. It provided the legal foundation for Jewish rights in Poland.

== History from the 12th century to World War I ==
There had probably been Jews in Kalisz since the 12th century, when refugees from the Crusader massacres fled to Poland from the Rhineland. Coins from the area stamped with names in Hebrew letters reveal that Jewish minters were active in the town during the 12th century.

As Polish Jewry developed rapidly in the early modern period, so did the Kalisz Jewish community. In the mid-14th century, Kalisz Jews received permission to build a synagogue, which stood for over four centuries until destroyed by fire.

The Kalisz Jewish community played an important role in the Council of the Four Lands, the supracommunal body that represented Polish Jewry to the king. Jews made their living as moneylenders, craftsmen, and import-export merchants dealing in livestock, horses, agricultural products and textiles. The Jewish merchants of Kalisz played an important role at the international fairs in the German cities of Leipzig and Breslau.

The Jewish population declined somewhat in the 17th and 18th centuries, due to the disruption of the Polish-Swedish War (1655–1659), as well as fires and plague in the 18th century. Even so, by 1793—when the region was annexed by Prussia—Jews owned about a quarter of the buildings in the town. At that time Jews constituted 40 percent of the population of Kalisz; they dominated the textile trade and made up half the craftsmen in the town. From 1815 until 1914 Kalisz was under Russian rule.

Russian authorities expelled Jewish residents who lacked Russian citizenship from Kalisz in 1881. A few years later, by 1897, the Jewish population of the town numbered 7,580, or about one-third of the total population.

=== Economy ===
Over the course of the 19th century, Jews continued to play a leading role in the local economy. Indeed, Christian business leaders in Kalisz, hostile to Jewish competition, pressured the Russian authorities to create a special Jewish quarter where Jews would be required to live. The quarter was established in 1827 when Jews made up about a third of the population. After the arrival of the railroad in the 1870s, industry developed rapidly. Products included textiles, woollens, and, most importantly, lace.

Lacework and embroidery became the principal industry in Kalisz, which was known as the lacework capital of the Russian Empire. Many Jews made their living from it, whether as industrialists, middlemen, or factory workers. By the early 20th century, Jews owned 32 of the 67 factories in the town. In 1904, Jews made up over half of Kalisz lace workers, most however, were poor labourers or artisans.

=== Religious life ===
Kalisz had already become an important spiritual center by the 17th century. In the 19th century, the pietist revival movement called "Hasidism" began to affect the town. The first Hasidic sect to gain followers in Kalisz was the Kotskers, followed by the Ger and Alexander Hasidim. By the 1890s Kalisz boasted two large synagogues and close to 40 smaller prayer houses. Three more synagogues, including one in the style of German Reform Judaism, were built in Kalisz in the first decade of the 20th century.

In the last half-century of Russian rule, as was the case throughout the Russian Empire, traditionalist Jews (both Hasidic and non-Hasidic) battled modernizers over issues such as education and rabbinate.

=== Political parties ===
Kalisz also had an array of Jewish political parties around the turn of the 20th century: mainstream Zionist, labor Zionist, religious Zionist, and socialist Bundist. These differing political visions were mirrored in the Jewish schools of Kalisz which by World War I included a bilingual Jewish high school, two Yiddish-oriented schools, and an Orthodox educational network of 1,800 students.

== World War I and aftermath ==
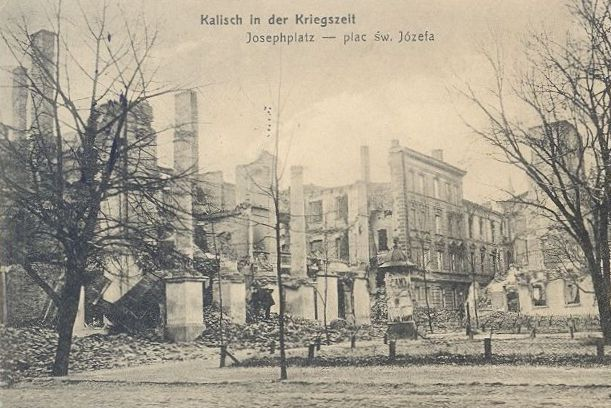
German destruction of Kalisz, 1914

During the first year of World War I, the invading German army destroyed 95% of Kalisz in a deliberate act committed on a defenceless city and killed 33 Jews. Some 60,000 citizens left in the August 1914 exodus.

Five years later, in the course of Poland's struggle for independence from the German Empire (see: Greater Poland Uprising featuring Batalion Pograniczny formed in Kalisz), two Jews lost their lives in the city in March 1919. Jewish sources deemed their deaths a pogrom, and the PMO members, fighting for independence, Polish nationalists.

== Interwar years ==
Kalisz had a population of 15,300 Jews (almost 30 percent of the total population), according to the 1931 Polish census.

The Jewish neighbourhood of Kalisz was in the northwest area of the central city, along the main Nowa Street boulevard. Nowa and adjacent streets were the site of the Great Synagogue and the House of Study. Along its expanse were the offices of Jewish organizations and clubs, as well as many Jewish shops ranging from large stores to small shops to tiny holes in the wall: bookstores, taverns, shops selling Hebrew and Yiddish newspapers, butchers, fish stores, and boutiques.

The bridge that carried Nowa Street over a branch of the Prosna River was the heart of Jewish activity. It was a place of constant traffic, with Jews coming and going between their homes and places of work, synagogues, and communal institutions. On this bridge business deals were closed; the unemployed stood and hoped to be chosen for a few hours' work; people gave and listened to political speeches and arguments; vendors sold snacks and drinks.

Jews lived in other parts of town as well. Kanonicka Street was also a heavily Jewish area and served as the home of the kehillah (community governing body) offices. Well-to-do Jewish families lived in various areas of the city.

Jewish café life also thrived. The most popular gathering place was the Udziałowa Café, where many people had regular tables and meeting times. Mayer Café, renowned for its delicious cakes, was the place for the Polish gentry, the Polish and Jewish middle class, professionals, and intellectuals. Young people hung out at the Café George, where members of all the Jewish youth movements could mingle—or, when politics dictated, sit at separate tables.

The Jews of Kalisz were not immune from the antisemitism that swept across Poland in the late 1930s. The town had an active antisemitic press, and bands of ruffians would often attack Jewish traders and peddlers on isolated roads as they were making their way to area markets. The situation deteriorated to the point that in 1936 a delegation of merchants traveled to Warsaw to present their case to the Prime Minister and the Ministry of Interior.

In 1937, Jews were forced to set up shop in a separate area in the town market, and Polish nationalists stood guard to ensure that Christians did not patronize Jewish-owned stalls. A year later, Kalisz was transferred to the Poznan district, where kosher slaughtering was prohibited. Even after intensive lobbying, the Kalisz slaughterers were permitted to produce only a small amount of kosher meat, which did not suffice for the Jewish population.

In 1939, on the eve of the German invasion, the Jewish population of Kalisz numbered over 20,000.

=== Economy ===
In the interwar period, Kalisz, which had a long history of producing lace and other textiles, became a center for the garment industry. In 1921, of the over 500 Jewish-owned factories and enterprises, 400 produced clothing or textiles (other products included metals, lumber, and leather). Flour from the 12 Jewish-owned mills in Kalisz reached all parts of Poland. There was also a handful of Jewish professionals.

Since Jewish workers constituted 45 percent of all wage-earners in Kalisz, it is not surprising that Jews played an important role in the town's trade unions. Some of the unions were open to all: the Embroiderers' Union had Polish, Jewish, and German members. Other unions were more segregated: the Garment Union organization had only Jewish members, and Polish tailors and garment workers belonged to the Polish Craftsmen Society. Jewish unions included associations of leather workers, clerks, porters, and female domestic workers. The latter advocated for the rights of young women who came to Kalisz from small towns and who were often subject to the whims of their employers. The association for female domestic workers helped to ensure fair treatment, decent wages, and a rest day on the Sabbath.

The two Jewish financial institutions established after World War I, the Merchants' Bank and the Cooperative Bank, failed during the Depression. As the economy deteriorated—and as the Polish government continued to adopt anti-Jewish economic policies—many industrial workers were forced into petty commerce or peddling with few prospects for a meaningful livelihood. As was the case in Jewish communities throughout Poland, the Kalisz Jewish community founded cooperative credit and banking institutions to assist the impoverished Jewish population.

=== Government ===
The kehillah, or official governing body for the Jewish community, was dominated by the ultra-Orthodox Agudah political party. It administered the Jewish welfare institutions of Kalisz: old-age home, Talmud Torah (school for poor children), orphanage, Jewish hospital (founded in 1835), and free clinic. The kehillah also oversaw the ritual bath and the two yeshivahs in the town, "Magen Avraham" and "Etz Hayyim."

The traditionalist Agudah majority of the kehillah faced various challenges during the interwar period, including a boycott of kosher slaughterers organized by the Zionist opposition members in order to cut off the tax revenue that was the mainstay of kehillah income. That income was declining anyway, as the economic situation of the Jews of Kalisz deteriorated. From 1932 to 1935, revenues decreased by 30 percent.

=== Politics ===
As was true throughout much of interwar Poland, Jewish life in Kalisz was heavily politicized. The non-Zionist, ultra-Orthodox Agudah boasted one of the strongest local branches in the country, with separate Workers of Agudah and Daughters of Agudah associations established in 1928. Zionism was an important influence as well. In 1920, a public celebration in honor of Britain's acceptance of the mandate of Palestine was attended by thousands and many offered contributions for the purchase of land in Palestine.

The socialist Zionist party Poale Zion sponsored a "Worker's Home" club, which organized lectures, Hebrew classes, and performances and offered a library and reading room to members. In 1900, a branch of the secular Jewish socialist Bund was founded in Kalisz. Jews were also active in general political life, with eleven Jewish residents elected to the municipal council as late as 1939.

=== Youth movements ===
Youth movements played an important role in the Kalisz Jewish community and could be found on all points of the political spectrum from the right-wing Zionist Betar organization to the communist Zionist Borochov organization. Some young Jews joined Zionist training farms in the countryside outside Kalisz to prepare for emigration to Palestine; many eventually emigrated. A number of Jewish communists from Kalisz volunteered to fight in the Spanish Civil War. Ten of them fell in battle.

=== Schools ===
The first modern Jewish school in Kalisz, with subjects taught in Russian, opened in 1862. Most children attended one of the seven Cheders (traditional schools for basic Jewish literacy) in Kalisz. A women's trade school opened early in the 20th century, and a bilingual Jewish gymnasium (high school) was founded in 1913. In 1917, the religious Zionist Mizrahi party founded a school as part of a national network. Orthodox educational institutions included a kindergarten, a trade school, and a girls' school called Havatselet ("Lily").

During the interwar period, two Yiddish schools were established by the labor Zionist Poale Zion group and the secular socialist "Bund." Many local Jewish children attended Polish public schools. A branch of the national TOZ organization, dedicated to the health of Jewish children, established summer camps for the weak and sick children of the town.

=== Cultural life ===
Kalisz had a flourishing Jewish cultural life. In the late 1920s and 1930s, two Yiddish weeklies kept the community abreast of local, national, and international news: the Agudah-leaning Kalisher lebn ("Kalisz Life") and the Zionist-leaning Kalisher vokh ("Kalisz Week").

A group of young people established a branch of YIVO, the Jewish Scientific Society, and conducted research on Jewish folklore and linguistics. The leading figure in Jewish literary life in Kalisz was poet and author Rosa Jakobowicz (Jacobson). The daughter of a rabbi, she studied Hebrew and religious subjects in her youth. After moving to Kalisz as a newlywed, she published her poetry in various journals and periodicals, including a cycle of poems on biblical women, the first of its kind in Yiddish. A collection of her poetry was published in 1924, entitled Mayne gezangen (My Songs). Jakobowicz died in the Warsaw ghetto in 1942. The writer Shimon Horonecki (Horonski) (1889–1939) lived in Kalisz for some years and wrote novels in which can be found descriptions of working class Jewish life in Kalisz.

The performing arts were also cultivated in Kalisz. Jews could enjoy performances by a Jewish orchestra, a brass band, and a theatrical troupe. Local Bund members were especially active in this arena, creating a cultural club, a drama club, a Working Women's Club, and the Comet Amateur Theater.

=== Sports ===
Throughout Europe, sports had become an important part of Jewish life, as the political theories of the period stressed the cultivation of the body as well as the spirit and the mind. Each Jewish political party had its own sports club, and the Gymnastics and Sports Association was an important non-political athletic, cultural, and educational organization for youth. The Jewish Rowers' Club of Kalisz participated in competitions at the national level.

=== Religious life ===
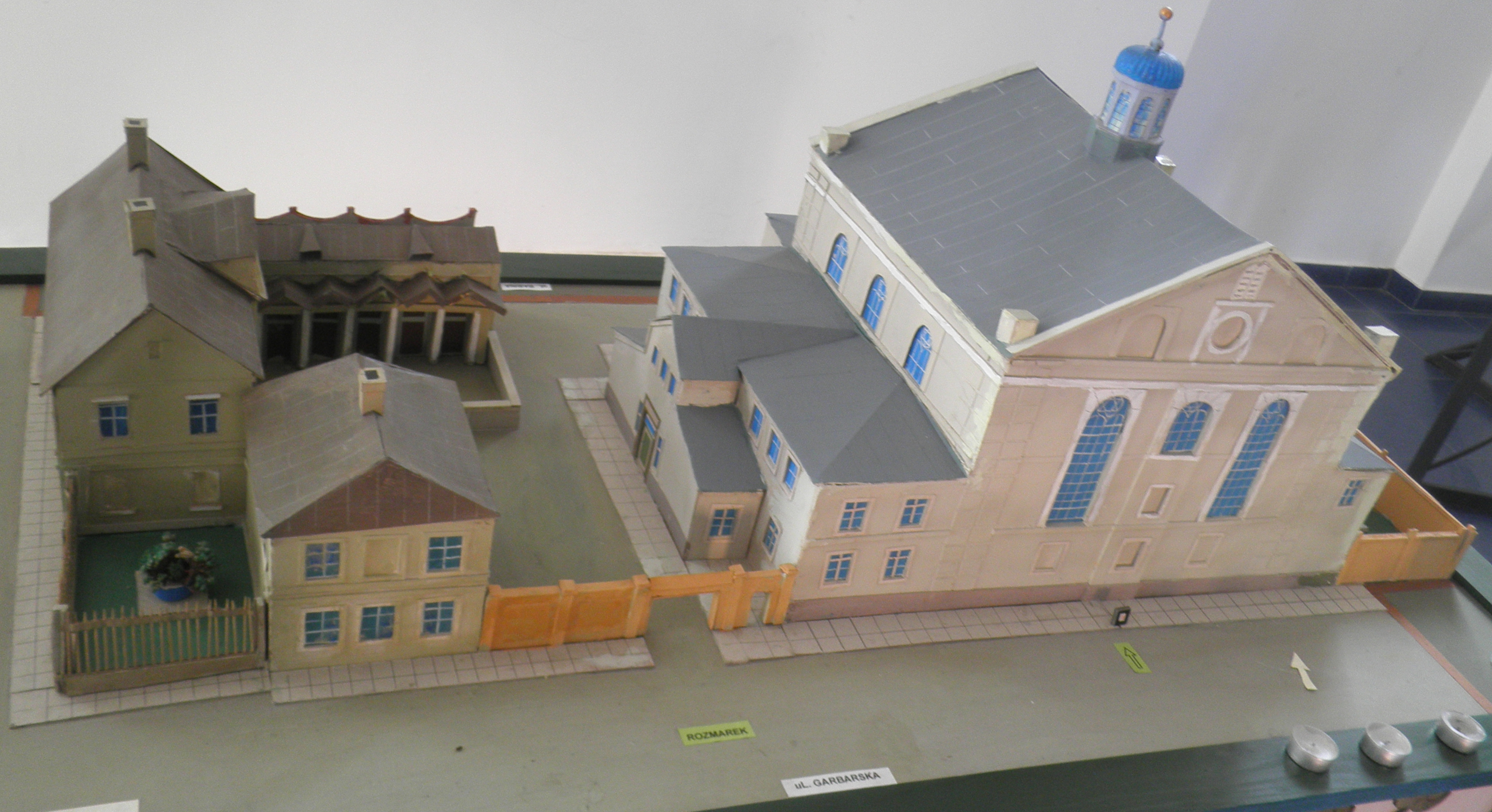
Model of Great Synagogue in Kalisz (Wielka Synagoga) is exposed at Jewish cemetery in Kalisz

The foremost personality in the religious life of prewar Kalisz was Rabbi Yehezkel Livshits, who served as rabbi from 1907 to 1932. President of the Rabbinical Association of Poland, a Zionist, and a friend of Chief Rabbi of Palestine Abraham Isaac Kook, Livshits was a force for solidarity and unity in the Kalisz community owing to his character and high standing. After his death, Menahem Mendl Alter, son of Rabbi Yehudah Aryeh Leib Alter the Hasidic Rebbe of Ger, was chosen in part because of the increasing influence of the Gerer Hasidim in Kalisz.

Besides Ger, which counted ten shtieblakh (small prayer houses) in the town, other Hasidic groups represented in Kalisz were Alexander, Sochaczow, Skiernewicz, Kotzk, Sokolow, Parisow, and Radomsk. In addition, the Rebbes of Zychlin and Wola lived in Kalisz. There were so many shtieblakh in Kalisz that some non-Hasidic or non-religious Jews reportedly even closed their windows on Friday nights to escape the loud singing.

During the interwar period, the two formal centers of religious life were the traditionalist Great Synagogue and the modern, western-style New Synagogue, called the German Shul. The latter boasted an organ and a choir that performed pieces of liturgical music by both German-Jewish and Russian-Jewish composers.

== World War II ==
The Germans invaded Poland in September 1939. This part of Poland was then incorporated into the Reich as the Warthegau. One aim was to remove or murder all Jews and to resettle people of German ancestry in the Warthegau who then lived further to the east.

A large proportion of Kalisz' Jewish population, which was about 20,000, fled during the time of the military campaign. Germans occupied the city on September 6. They immediately began brutal measures against the Jews: murder, robbery, humiliation, and other abuse. Later Jews were relocated to a central location, and in late 1939, thousands were sent to other cities, including Lublin. Of the remaining, in October 1940, hundreds were murdered in a nearby forest. In 1941, about 100 were sent to Poznań for forced labor and more than 200 were murdered, some in gas vans. In 1942, the remaining Jews were sent to Poznań and to the Łódź ghetto.

== Post WWII ==
Most of Kalisz's Jews were killed in the Holocaust. Following the war, Jewish Holocaust survivors returned to the city, by 1946 numbering some 500. By the late 1940s only some 100 remained, and those few who stayed blended into non-Jewish society. Today, Kalisz has no Jewish community.

== Notes ==
This article is based entirely on text from the United States Holocaust Memorial Museum, and has been released under the GFDL.
