= Florian Dinhopel =

Austrian ice hockey player

- Born: 13 January 1987 (age 38)
- Height: 5 ft 10 in (178 cm)
- Weight: 160 lb (73 kg; 11 st 6 lb)
- Position: Forward
- Shoots: Right
- Elite League team Former teams: EV Zeltweg; EV Zeltweg, Graz 99ers
- Playing career: 2002–present

Florian Dinhopel (born 13 January 1987) is an Austrian ice hockey forward playing for EV Zeltweg of the Austrian Elite League.
