= Floriano Buroni =

Italian engraver

Floriano Buroni or Bonis (active c. 1670) was an Italian engraver. He was born in Bologna. Among other prints, he produced a plate representing a Dead Christ with his mother and St. John, after Guercino. His name is also affixed to a portrait of Guido Reni.
