= Hube Rural LLG =

Local-level government in Papua New Guinea

- Location within Papua New Guinea
- Coordinates: 6.444309°S 147.518031°E
- Country: Papua New Guinea
- Province: Morobe Province
- Time zone: UTC+10 (AEST)

Hube Rural LLG is a local-level government (LLG) of Morobe Province, Papua New Guinea.

== Wards ==
- 17. Pindiu Station
- 18. Tireng
- 19. Magazezu
- 20. Gemaheng
- 21. Sembang (Sofifi)
- 22. Sanangac
- 23. Zaningu
- 24. Homoneng
- 25. Morago
- 26. Besibong
- 27. Pindiu Station
- 28. Zenguru
- 29. Qwakugu
- 30. Genna
- 31. Gaeng
- 32. Sofifi
