= Florian Schäfer =

German politician (born 1986)

Member of the Landtag of Saarland
- Incumbent
- Assumed office 25 April 2022
- Constituency: Saarlouis

Personal details
- Born: 9 January 1986 (age 40)
- Party: Social Democratic Party (since 2017)

Florian Schäfer (born 9 January 1986) is a German politician serving as a member of the Landtag of Saarland since 2022. He has served as chairman of the Social Democratic Party in Saarlouis since 2019.
