= Florian Siekmann =

German politician (born 1995)

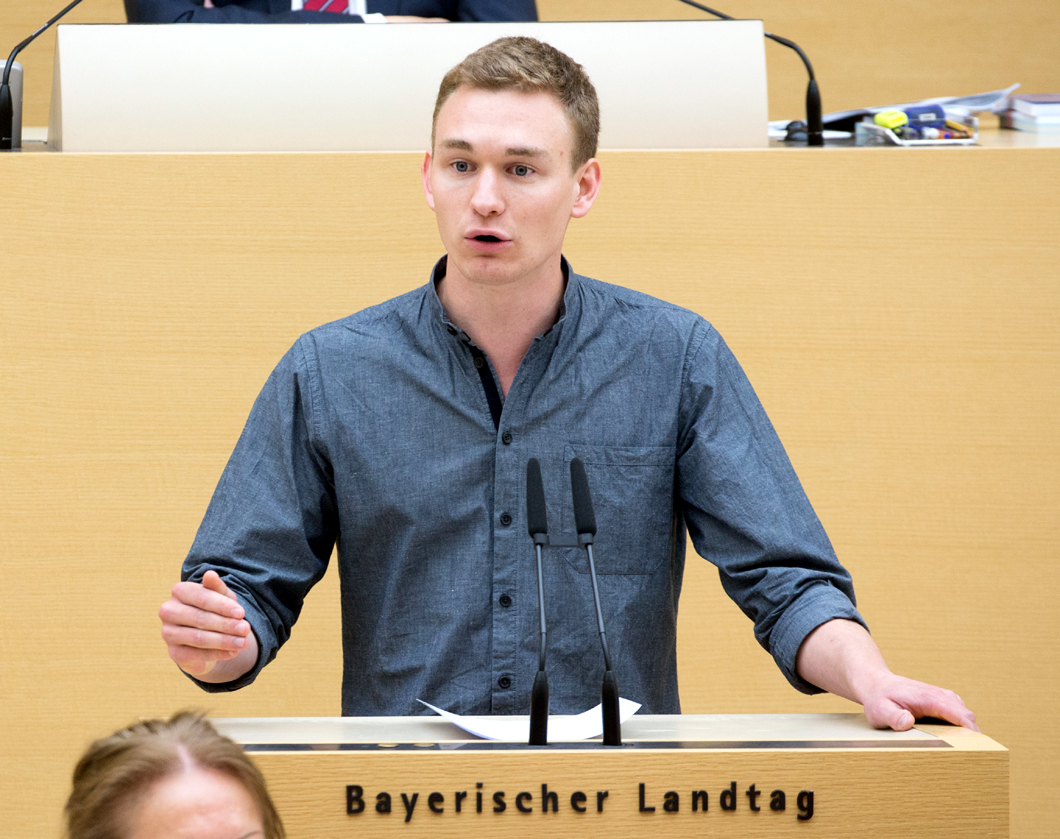
- Siekmann in 2019

Member of the Landtag of Bavaria
- Incumbent
- Assumed office 5 November 2018
- Constituency: Upper Bavaria

Personal details
- Born: 1 February 1995 (age 31) Koblenz
- Party: Alliance 90/The Greens (since 2015)

Florian Siekmann (born 1 February 1995 in Koblenz) is a German politician serving as a member of the Landtag of Bavaria since 2018. He has served as co-chairman of Alliance 90/The Greens in Munich since 2024.
