= Florian Stengg =

Austrian freestyle skier

Personal information
- Nationality: Austrian
- Born: April 25, 1989 (age 37)

Sport
- Sport: Skiing

Florian Stengg (born 25 April 1989) is an Austrian freestyle skier who specializes in the skicross discipline.

He made his World Cup debut in January 2009 in St. Johann in Tirol, finishing 23rd. He followed up with a seventh place in Les Contamines and a twelfth place in Flaine.

He represents the sports club SK Telfs.
