= Florian Müller =

Florian Müller may refer to:

- Florian Müller (author) (born 1970), German author, entrepreneur, blogger, lobbyist, and business consultant
- Florian Müller (footballer, born 1986), German footballer
- Florian Müller (footballer, born 1997), German footballer
- Florian Müller (politician) (born 1987), member of the Bundestag
- Florian Müller (luger) (born 2001), German luger
