= Florian Vogel =

Florian Vogel may refer to:

- Florian Vogel (cyclist) (born 1982), Swiss racing cyclist
- Florian Vogel (swimmer) (born 1994), German Olympic swimmer
