= Constanza Hube =

Chilean lawyer (born 1987)

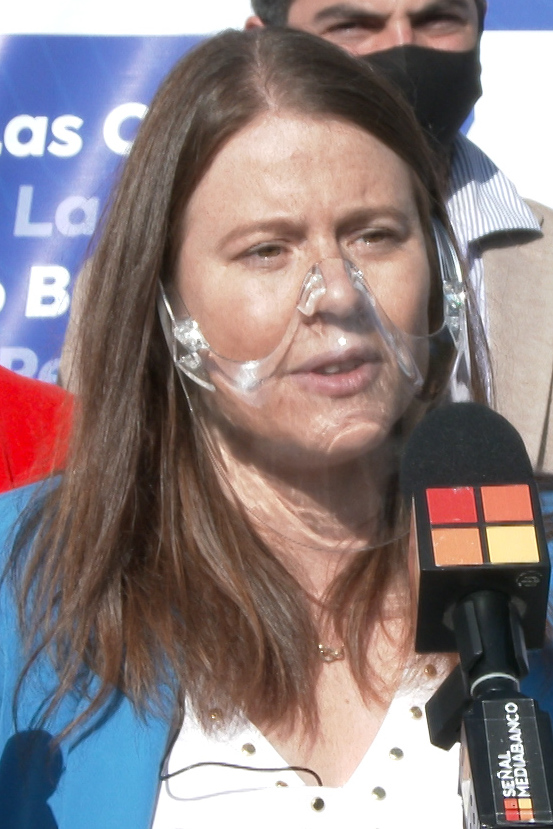

Member of the Chamber of Deputies
- Incumbent
- Assumed office 11 March 2026
- Constituency: 11th District

Member of the Constitutional Convention
- In office 4 July 2021 – 4 July 2022
- Constituency: 11th District

Personal details
- Born: 10 March 1987 (age 39) Santiago, Chile
- Party: Independent Democratic Union (UDI)
- Education: Pontifical Catholic University of Chile (LL.B); New York University (LL.M)
- Profession: Lawyer

Constanza Verónica Hube Portus (born 10 March 1987) is a Chilean lawyer who served as a member of the Chilean Constitutional Convention. She holds a law degree from the Pontifical Catholic University of Chile and an LLM from New York University.

Affiliated with the Independent Democratic Union (UDI), she was elected as a member of Chile’s Constitutional Convention for District 11 (Las Condes, Lo Barnechea, Vitacura, La Reina, Peñalolén), serving from 4 July 2021 to 4 July 2022.

== Biography ==
=== Early life ===
Born on 10 March 1986 in Valdivia, Hube is the daughter of Roberto Hube Barra and Lilian Portus Ortega. She attended Colegio Alemán St. Thomas Morus in Providencia, graduating in 2003.

She earned her Law degree from Pontifical Catholic University of Chile (PUC) in 2008, followed by a Master’s in Public Law (Constitutional Law emphasis) at the same university (2012–2014), where she received the Alejandro Silva Bascuñán award.

In 2014–2015, she completed a Master of Laws (LL.M.) at New York University as a Fulbright and CONICYT scholar.

=== Academic and professional career ===
Since 2013, Hube has served as a constitutional law professor at the PUC and, from early 2020, as subdirector of its Department of Public Law.

Additionally, she conducted legislative research at the think tank, Libertad y Desarrollo, and served as a public policy advisor at the Ministry General Secretariat of Government and in the Senate.

== Political career ==
Supported by the center-right Chile Vamos coalition, Hube was elected to the Constitutional Convention in May 2021, securing 18,806 votes (4.89%) and earning a seat in District 11. In the Convention, she participated in the Regulation Commission, and later joined commissions on Political System, Legislature & Electoral System, as well as Transitory Norms.

Hube advocated for greater cooperation between the President and Congress (“parliamentarizing presidentialism”), and emphasized constitutional protections for individual freedoms, private property, decentralized governance, and Central Bank of Chile autonomy.

After the referendum’s rejection, Hube engaged in public debate, notably representing the Confederation of Production and Commerce (CPC) in July 2023, when she led a legal submission challenging the government's "white collar crimes" law on constitutional grounds.

She is also a Constitutional Law Professor at her alma mater. By the other hand, she is linked to LyD.
