= Florian Zellhofer =

Austrian footballer

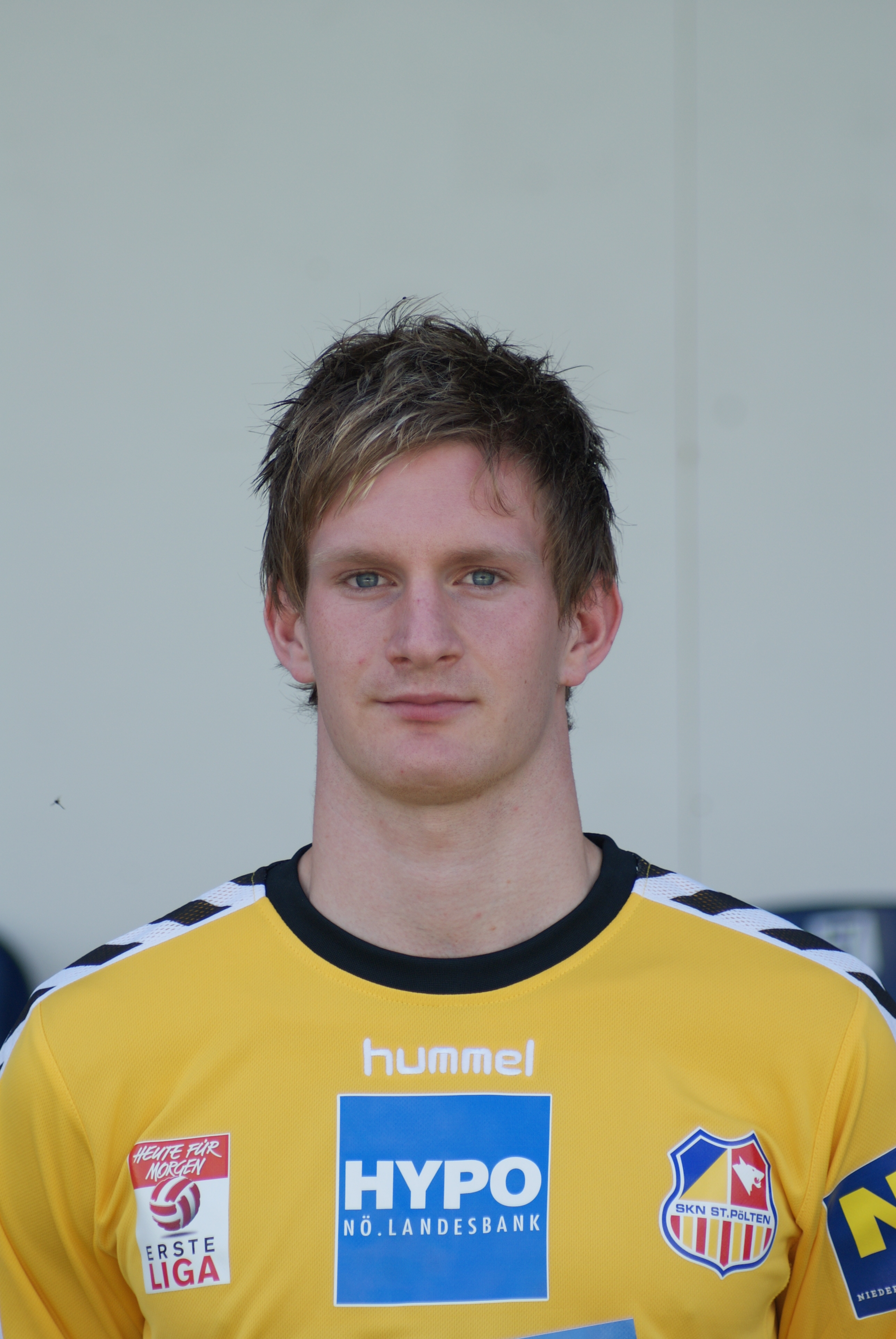

Personal information
- Full name: Florian Zellhofer
- Date of birth: 17 August 1988 (age 38)
- Place of birth: Scheibbs, Austria
- Height: 1.80 m (5 ft 11 in)
- Position: Striker

Team information
- Current team: First Vienna FC
- Number: 18

Youth career
- 2002–2007: AKA St. Pölten

Senior career*
Years	Team	Apps	(Gls)
2007–2011	SKN St. Pölten	66	(10)
2011–2013	FC Lustenau 07	69	(11)
2013–	First Vienna FC	10	(1)
- * Club domestic league appearances and goals as of 18:31, 20 September 2013 (UTC)

Florian Zellhofer (born 17 August 1988) is an Austrian footballer who currently plays as a striker for First Vienna FC.
