= Florian Święs =

Florian Święs (Polish pronunciation: [flɔ.rjan ɕfjɛw̃s]; born 24 September 1939) is a Polish biologist. He is a full professor of Biology and Earth Sciences at the Maria Curie-Skłodowska University. In 1992 he became the Head of the Geobiology Division at the Institute of Biology.

He received his MA from UMCS in 1962, his Ph.D. in 1968, and became a professor in 1992.

== Books ==
- Święs F. (1982a). Geobotaniczna charakterystyka lasów dorzeczy Jasiołki i Wisłoka. Przemyśl; Rzeszów: Towarzystwo Przyjaciół Nauk; Krajowa Agencja Wydawnicza. OCLC 69477632 ISBN 978-83-03-00396-6
- Święs F. (1982b). Charakterystyka geobotaniczna lasów Beskidu Niskiego. Przemyśl: Towarzystwo Przyjaciół Nauk w Przemyśle. OCLC 21773660
- Święs F. (1983). Zbiorowiska leśne dorzecza Wisłoki w Beskidzie Niskim. Warsaw: PWN. OCLC 10115091 ISBN 9788301022372
- Święs F. (1985). Fitosocjologiczna charakterystyka lasów dorzecza Ropy w Beskidzie Niskim. Warsaw: PWN. OCLC 37928342 ISBN 978-83-01-02871-8
- Święs F. (1993). Roślinność synantropijna miasta Rzeszowa. Lublin: Wydaw. UMCS. ISBN 83-227-0546-8.
- Święs F. (1994). A Survey of Ruderal Vegetation in Poland: Phytocenoses with Reynoutria sachalinensis.
- Święs F. (1995). A Survey of Ruderal Vegetation in Poland: Phytocenoses with Rudbeckia laciniata L., Solidago canadensis L. and S. gigantea Aiton. Ann. Univ. MCS.
- Święs F. (1997). A Survey of ruderal vegetation in Poland: phytocenoses with Lycium barbarum L. Ann. Univ. MCS.
- Święs F., Kwiatkowska-Farbis M. (1998). Roślinność synantropijna miasta Łukowa. Synanthropic Vegetation of Łuków City. Lublin: Wydawnictwo UMCS. OCLC 76267849 ISBN 83-227-1320-7
- Święs F., Kwiatkowska-Farbiś M. (1998): Synanthropic Vegetation of Łuków City. Lublin: Wydawnictwo UMCS. OCLC 76267849 ISBN 83-227-1320-7
- Święs F., Kalicka M. (2001). Struktura i funkcjonowanie biosfery. Sandomierz: Wyd. Tow. Naukowe Sandomierskie.
- Święs F., Święs P. (2001). Struktura i funkcjonowanie biosfery. II. Hydrosfera. Sandomierz : Wyższa Szkoła Humanistyczno-Przyrodnicza. OCLC 69528821
- Święs F., Wrzesień M. (2005). The role of railway grounds in the areas of the Lublin-Lvov Upland and Volhynian-Podolian Upland in the expansion of anthropophytes of Poaceae family. Lublin: Wydawnictwo UMCS. OCLC 64231344
- Święs F., Wrzesień M. (2006). Flora and vascular plants communities of railway areas of the western part of the Lublin Upland. Lublin: Wydawnictwo UMCS. OCLC 69295011 ISBN 978-83-227-2499-6
