= Florian =

Florian may refer to:

== People ==
- Florian (name), including a list of people and fictional characters with the given name or surname
- Florian (Marcus Annius Florianus), Roman emperor in 276 AD
- Saint Florian (250 – c. 304 AD), patron saint of Poland and Upper Austria, also of the cities of Kraków, Poland; Linz, Austria; firefighters, chimney sweeps and soapmakers

== Other uses ==
- Florian, Minnesota, a place in the U.S.
- Florian (film), a 1940 American romantic comedy
- Florian (1938 film), a Polish film of the 1930s
- Florians, a religious order
- Caffè Florian, a coffee house in Venice
- Isuzu Florian, a car
- Florian, the prince of the Flower Kingdom in Super Mario Bros. Wonder

== See also ==
- Sankt Florian (disambiguation)
- Florianópolis, a city in Brazil, capital of the state of Santa Catarina
