= Florian Hube =

German footballer (born 1980)

Personal information
- Date of birth: 30 September 1980 (age 46)
- Place of birth: Berlin, Germany
- Height: 1.84 m (6 ft 0 in)
- Position: Defender

Youth career
- BSC Rehberge 45
- Tennis Borussia Berlin
- Reinickendorfer Füchse

Senior career*
Years	Team	Apps	(Gls)
1998–1999	Reinickendorfer Füchse		
1999–2002	SpVgg Greuther Fürth	6	(0)
2002–2004	Reinickendorfer Füchse		
2004–2009	Hertha BSC Berlin II	106	(1)
2009–2011	Lichterfelder FC	14	(2)
2011–2013	Reinickendorfer Füchse		
- * Club domestic league appearances and goals

Florian Hube (born 30 September 1980) is a German retired football player. He made his professional debut in the 1999–2000 season for SpVgg Greuther Fürth in the 2. Fußball-Bundesliga.
