= Florian Tschögl =

Florian Tschögl was one of the Righteous among the Nations, awarded from Yad Vashem. In 1943, while serving in the Wehrmacht, Tschögl was ordered to guard captured Soviet soldiers in a prison camp in Moledeczno, Belarus. There he met the Jewish Arzichowski family, which had been denounced by Polish antisemites as plotting against German soldiers.

Tschögl resolved to save the family from deportation and death and denied the claims against them. From 1943 to 1944 he provided the family with food and supplies. When other soldiers tried to imprison one of the family's daughters, Sarah, Tschögl sheltered her in his house. The Arzichowskis survived the war.
