= Romuald Hube =

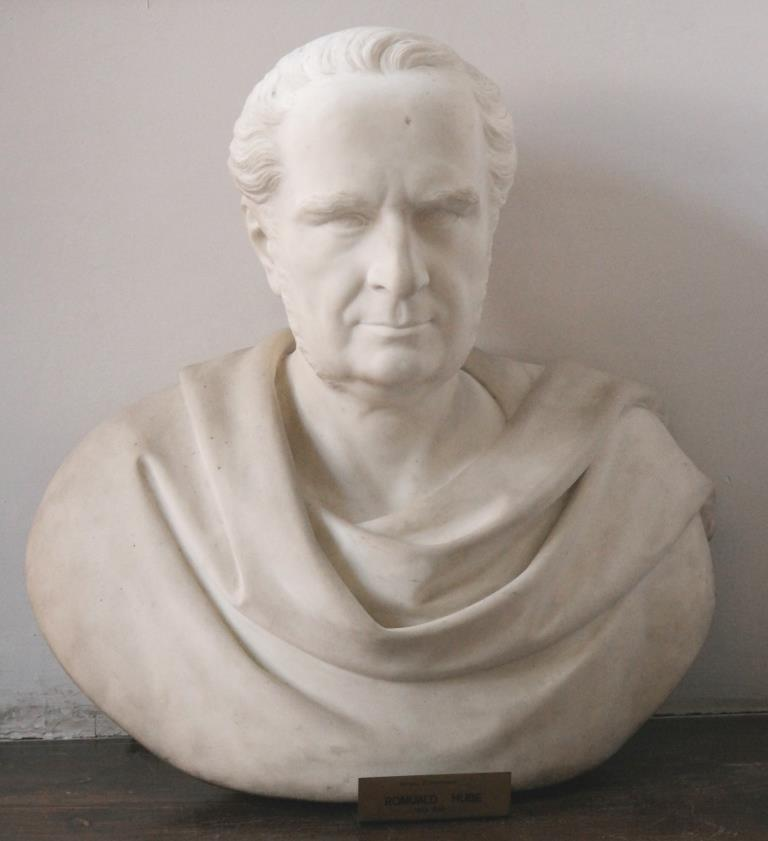
Bust of Romuald Hube in Collegium Maius in Wrocław

Romuald Hube (1803–September 1890) was a Polish law scholar.

Romuald Hube studied in Warsaw, then listened to the lectures of Savigny, Hegel, Steffens, Boeckh, and Ritters in Berlin. In 1825 he became a lecturer of general legal history at the University of Warsaw. In 1829 he became a full professor of canonical and criminal law at the university, while his brother Joseph Hube at the same time assumed the chair of the department of legal history.

As a result of the November Uprising in 1831, he left the university and in 1832 became a prosecutor at the criminal courts of the voivodeships Masovien and Kalisch. The following year, he was called to Saint Petersburg as a member of the Legislative Commission for Poland, in which he worked on the published criminal code and the Criminal Code for Poland.

He was then appointed to the Council of State, and in 1843 he was appointed a permanent member of the magistrate, and afterwards became a member of the most important legislatures of Russia. In 1846 he accompanied Count Bludov to Rome, and in 1850 he was appointed Privy Councilor and Senator of the Imperial Empire. In 1857 he became an honorary member of the Petersburg Academy.

Hube published the Fragmenta Ulpiani (Warsaw 1826), the Institutiones Gaji (Warsaw 1827), the Lex Salica (1867), and wrote a famous treatise: De furtis doctrina ex jure romano historice et dogmatice explicata.

Among his Polish writings are Ogólne zasady nauki prawa karnego ("Principles of Criminal Law", Warsaw 1830) and Prawo polskie w wieku XIII. ("Polish law in the 13th century", Warsaw 1875).

He was also the chief founder of the legal journal Themis polska, and gave his brother Joseph A Historical account of the Slavs' inheritance (Zupanski, Posen, 1836).
