= Baldassare =

Baldassare is a masculine Italian given name. It is the Italian spelling of Balthazar. Notable people with the name include:

- Baldassare Aloisi (1578–1638), Italian history and portrait painter and engraver
- Baldassare Amato (born 1958), Sicilian gangster
- Baldassare d'Anna (1560–after 1639), Italian painter
- Baldassare de Benavente (1638–1687), Italian Catholic priest
- Baldassarre di Biagio (1430/1434–1484), Italian painter
- Baldassare Bianchi (1612–1679), Italian painter
- Baldassarre Boncompagni (1821–1894), Italian aristocrat and mathematical historian
- Baldassare Cagliares (1575–1633), Maltese Catholic priest
- Baldassare Calamai (1797–1851), Italian painter
- Baldassarre De Caro (1689–1750), Italian painter
- Baldassare Carrari (1460–1516), Italian painter
- Baldassarre Carrari the Elder, 14th-century Italian painter
- Baldassare Castiglione (1478–1529), Italian Renaissance writer
- Baldassare Cenci (1648–1709), Italian Catholic cardinal
- Baldassare Cenci (1710–1763), Italian Catholic cardinal
- Baldassare Cittadella (1603–1651), Italian Jesuit missionary
- Baldassare Croce (1558–1628), Italian painter
- Baldassare d'Anna (circa 1560–1600), Italian painter
- Baldassare Di Maggio (born 1954), Sicilian Mafioso
- Baldassare Donato (circa 1525–1603), Italian composer and singer
- Baldassare Estense (1443–after 1504), Italian painter
- Baldassare Ferri (1610–1680), Italian singer
- Baldassare Forestiere (1879–1946), Italian-American founder of the Forestiere Underground Gardens
- Baldassare Franceschini (1611–1689), Italian Baroque painter
- Baldassare Gabbugiani (fl. 18th century), Italian engraver
- Baldassare Galuppi (1706–1785), Venetian composer
- Baldassare Labanca (1832–1913), Italian Christian theologian and historian
- Baldassare Longhena (1598–1682), Italian architect
- Baldassare Marachi (died 1540), Italian Catholic priest
- Baldassare Palazzotto (1770–1858), Italian priest, bibliographer and ornithologist
- Baldassare Peruzzi (1481–1537), Italian architect and painter
- Baldassare Porto (1923–2013), Italian sprinter
- Baldassare Ravaschieri (1420–1492), Italian Catholic priest
- Baldassare Reina (born 1970), Italian Catholic priest
- Baldassarre Squitti (1855–?), Italian writer, law professor and parliamentarian
- Baldassare Verazzi (1819–1886), Italian painter
