= Cenacolo Artistico Forlivese =

Association of artists

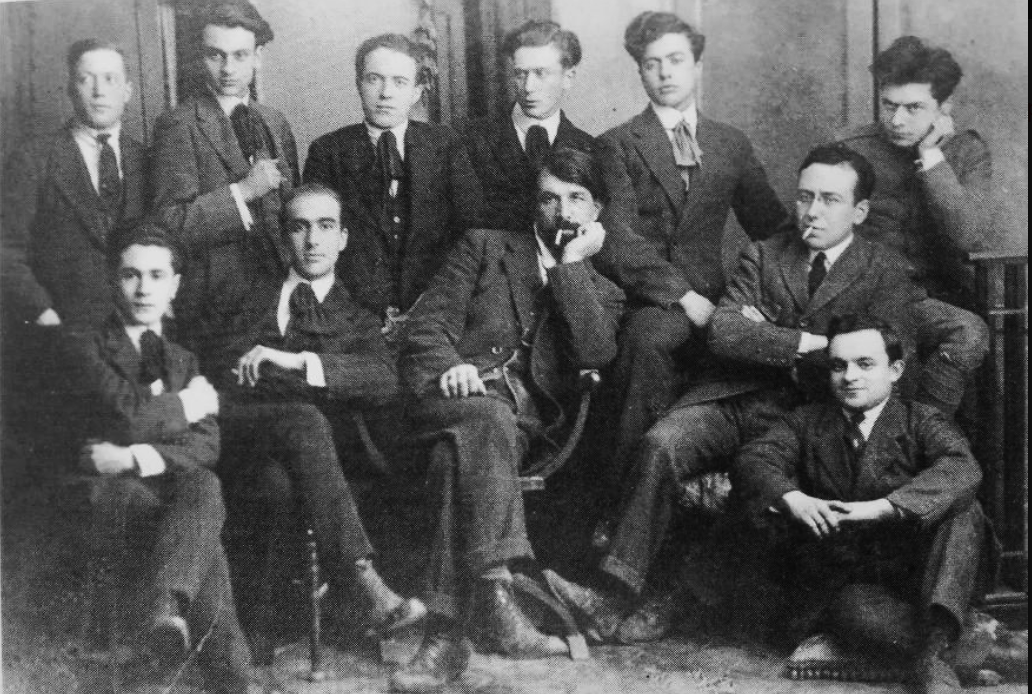
Group photo of the members of the Cenacolo Artistico Forlivese, with founder Giovanni Marchini at the center

The Cenacolo Artistico Forlivese (literally "Forlì Artistic Cenacle") was an association of artists active in Forlì during the 1920s. It marked a significant revival of sculpture and painting in Forlì in the early twentieth century, representing a central experience within the broader Italian cultural context, with close ties to the main national artistic centers.

== History ==
The association was founded in 1920 at the initiative of the painter Giovanni Marchini and the poet-priest Tommaso Nediani.

It was based in the former tollgate building of Porta Cotogni, on the right side of the road coming from Piazza Aurelio Saffi. The headquarters were inaugurated on 25 November 1920, along with its statute, banner, and motto Sub luce tua carpimus iter.

The Cenacolo received a painting from Giacomo Balla titled Siamo in quattro (beato chi li trova), which later entered in 1930 the collections of the Pinacoteca civica di Forlì, where it is still preserved today.

The experience of the Cenacolo ended in 1928, both due to financial difficulties and increasing restrictions imposed by the regime. The premises disappeared when the former tollgate buildings were demolished to make way for two new buildings, the so-called Twin Buildings.

=== Members ===
Members of the Cenacolo Artistico Forlivese included, among others:

- Giovanni Marchini (1877–1946), founder, painter
- Tommaso Nediani, founder, writer
- Pietro Angelini (1888–1977), painter
- Renato Baldani (1884–1944)
- Dino Bissi
- Bernardino Boifava (1888–1953), sculptor
- Leonida Brunetti (1896–1970), painter
- Maceo Casadei (1899–1992), painter
- Augusto Antonio Dirani (1897–1983)
- Luciano De Nardis (1895–1959), pseudonym of Livio Carloni
- Luigi Galotti
- Nino Muratori
- Francesco Olivucci (1899–1985), painter
- Ferdinando Rosetti
- Pio Rossi (1890–1969)
- Orazio Spighi (1889–1950)
- Carlo Stanghellini (1901–1956), painter
- Umberto Zimelli (1898–1972)

== Activities and objectives ==
The Cenacolo was born as a response to a period of artistic stagnation in early twentieth-century Forlì, with the ambition of reviving the local pictorial and sculptural tradition while placing it in active dialogue with Italy's main cultural centers. Led by the painter Giovanni Marchini, a student of Giovanni Fattori and known for his bohemian temperament and local fame, the group aimed to overcome provincial isolation by fostering direct exchanges with Florence, Bologna, Venice, and Rome, where artists could meet, exhibit, and draw inspiration from contemporary Italian movements.

This vision took shape through friendships and connections formed in different contexts: from art academies and drawing schools, to the trenches of the First World War, and even experiences of emigration abroad. These networks brought together different generations, from mature masters such as Pietro Angelini, Bernardino Boifava, and Pio Rossi, to young talents in their twenties such as Maceo Casadei, Carlo Stanghellini, and Umberto Zimelli, many of them former students of the Academy of Ravenna.

Activities revolved around the headquarters in Porta Cotogni, where meetings, discussions, and collective exhibitions were held, allowing members to share techniques, visions, and critiques, thereby stimulating creative renewal. The goal was not merely local: it aimed to elevate the Forlì artistic school, heir to the Renaissance tradition of figures such as Marco Palmezzano, to a national level, promoting art as a tool for cultural and personal growth in the post-war period.

== See also ==
- Forlivese school of art
- Forlì
