= Museo Civico San Domenico =

Museum complex in Forlì, Emilia-Romagna, Italy

- Musei San Domenico
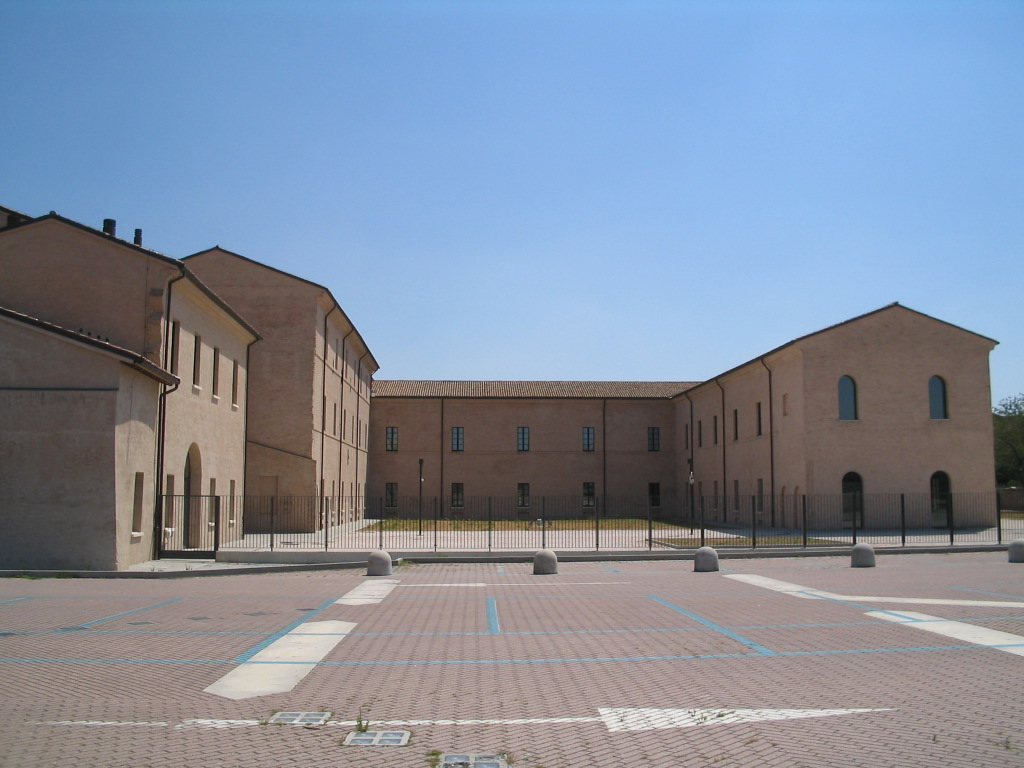
- The San Domenico complex
- Interactive fullscreen map
- Established: 2005
- Location: Piazza Guido da Montefeltro, 12, Forlì, Italy
- Coordinates: 44°13′17″N 12°02′10″E
- Type: Art museum, historic site
- Visitors: 52,537 (2022)
- Director: Gianfranco Brunelli
- Website: mostremuseisandomenico.it/uk-version/

The Museo Civico San Domenico, also known as Musei San Domenico, is a museum complex in Forlì, Italy, housed in a former Dominican convent dating from the 13th century. It houses several permanent collections, including the Civic Art Gallery, and regularly hosts temporary exhibitions.

== History ==
The San Domenico Civic Museum in Forlì is located in the former Dominican convent, founded in the 13th century and subsequently expanded between the 15th century and the 18th century. After the suppression of religious orders, the complex was used as barracks and later for industrial purposes. Starting in 1980, initial consolidation and restoration works were undertaken, highlighting the historical and artistic value of the building and promoting its transformation into a museum venue. In 1996, the restoration project was incorporated into a broader plan for reorganizing the city’s cultural institutions, with the aim of restoring the complex’s central role through exhibition functions, research spaces, and urban cultural routes.

The restoration, which lasted over a decade, made it possible to reconstruct the developmental phases of the convent, from the 13th-century church to Renaissance and 18th-century transformations, and its long military use between the 19th century and the 20th century. The convent’s architectural typology proved suitable for its new function, allowing the various museum sections to be arranged within its spaces. The ground floor and underground areas were designated for the Archaeological Museum and the city museum, while the upper floor houses the Civic Art Gallery and large library halls, suitable for altarpieces and important collections, including the statue of Hebe by Antonio Canova. The Church of San Giacomo, restored as a unified space, is used for temporary exhibitions, concerts, and conferences, while the underground areas contain archaeological finds, visible storage areas, and restoration laboratories.

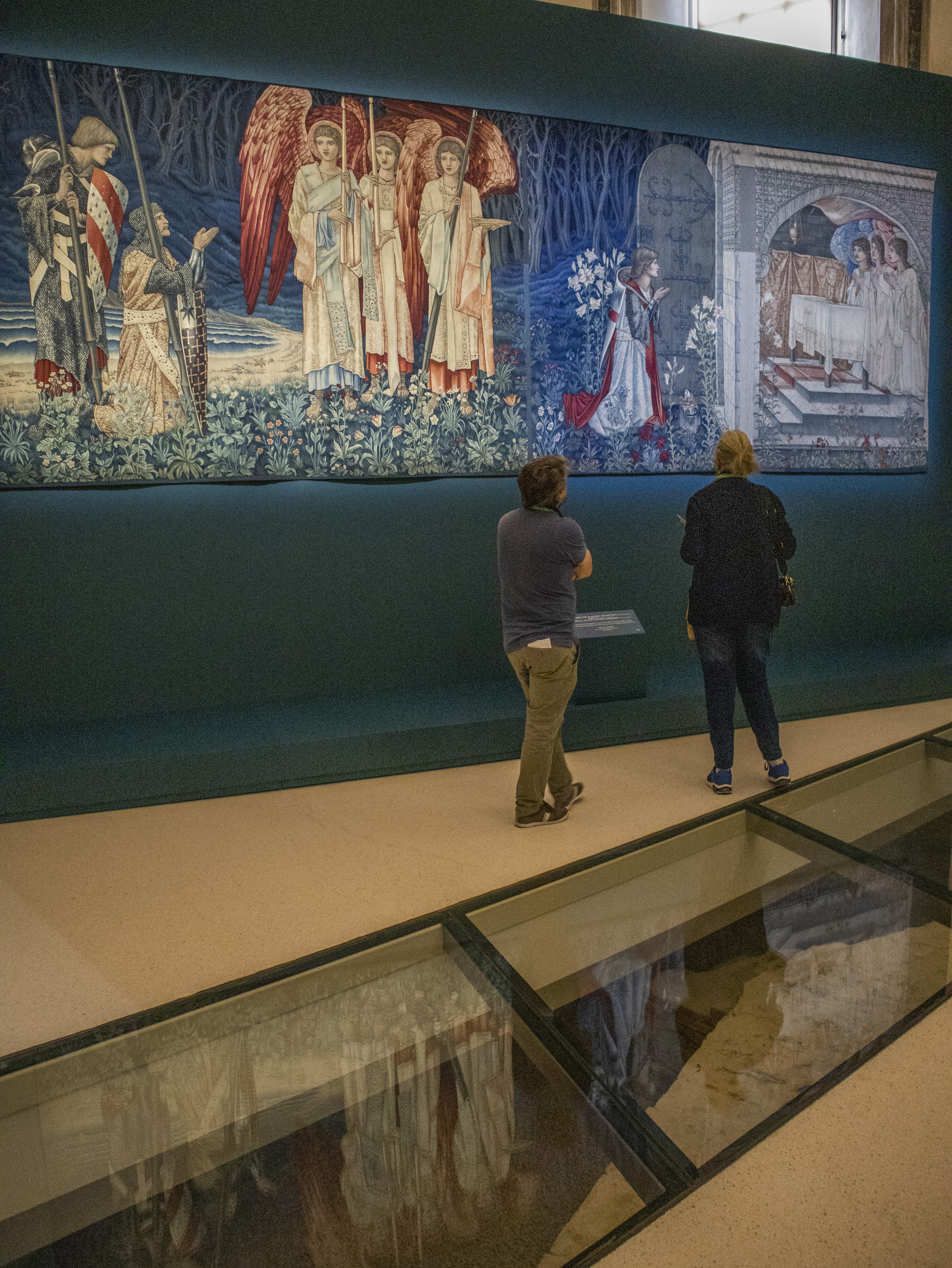
Detail of the exhibition layout

The project followed principles of conservation and enhancement, involving the use of materials compatible with the original ones and the insertion of recognizable modern elements, achieving a balance between respect for historical integrity and contemporary functionality. The museum layout was designed to integrate the historical character of the spaces with the needs of a modern museum, through architectural and lighting solutions that enhance spatial continuity and the readability of the artworks.

The museum officially opened in 2005 with a major exhibition dedicated to Marco Palmezzano, marking the beginning of the complex’s new cultural function, now considered one of the city’s main museum centers.

== Description ==
The San Domenico museum complex consists of five structures:

- Dominican Convent – Founded in the 13th century and expanded in subsequent centuries, it constitutes the original core of the complex.
- Church of San Giacomo Apostolo – Built between the 13th and 14th centuries, it preserves frescoes and Renaissance decorations and is incorporated into the exhibition route.
- Augustinian Convent – Dating back to the 13th century, it was progressively transformed and is now integrated as a venue for temporary exhibitions.
- Santa Caterina Hall – A space decorated with 14th-century pictorial cycles, currently used for conferences, cultural events, and special exhibitions.
- Palazzo Pasquali – Built in the 15th century, it represents an example of Renaissance civil architecture and is now used for exhibitions and cultural activities.

The refectory of the Dominican convent features 16th-century frescoes attributed to Girolamo Ugolini. On the north-east wall, the fresco is divided into three sections separated by architectural elements, with the Crucifixion in the center, the appearance of Saints Peter and Paul to Saint Dominic on the left, and Saint Dominic resurrecting the young Napoleone Orsini, who had fallen from a horse, on the right. On the south-west wall is depicted the table of Saint Dominic with the miracle of the loaves. This latter fresco was severely damaged by soldiers during the Napoleonic period.

== Permanent collections ==
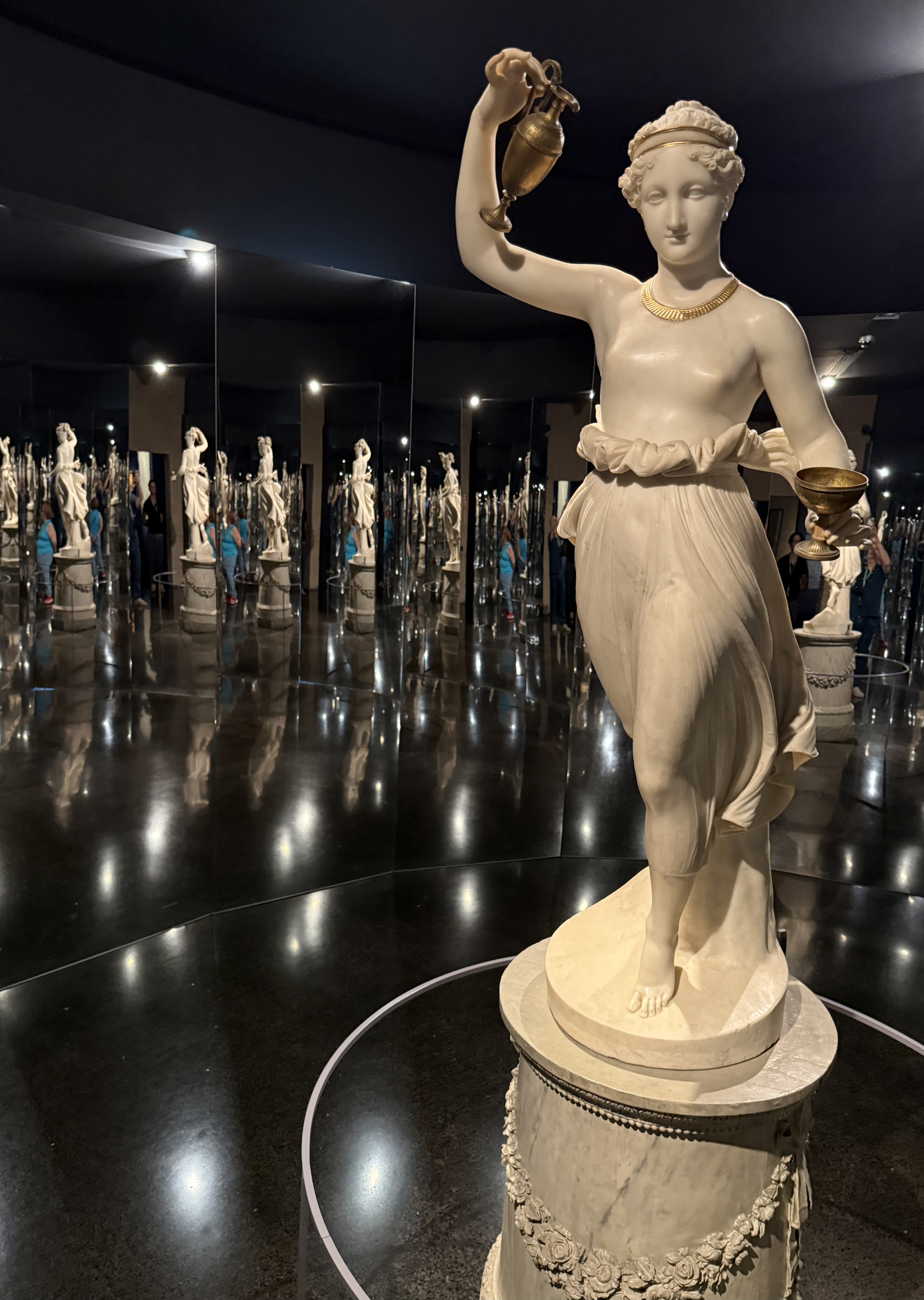
Hebe by Antonio Canova

The museum spaces host a rich variety of permanent collections ranging from medieval art to the 20th century, from prehistoric archaeology to modern sculpture.

=== Civic Art Gallery ===
The Civic Art Gallery, inaugurated in 1838, is housed within the complex and presents a vast collection of works covering a time span from the 13th to the 18th century. Among the most significant works are paintings by artists such as Beato Angelico, Guido Cagnacci, Antonio Canova, Baldassarre Carrari, Maceo Casadei, Domenichino, Gregorio di Lorenzo (the Master of the Marble Madonnas), Guercino, Lorenzo di Credi, Maestro dei Baldraccani, Melozzo da Forlì, Giorgio Morandi, Francesco Menzocchi, Livio Modigliani, Giovanni Antonio Nessoli, Marco Palmezzano, Antonio Rossellino, and others. This section offers a comprehensive overview of the artistic evolution of the region, with works spanning from the Middle Ages to the 18th century.

=== Major Donors ===
The “Major Donors” section, inaugurated in 2025 within the museum partly in the former Church of San Giacomo, brings together artworks donated to the city by collectors, families, and local patrons. The exhibition route is designed to highlight private contributions to civic heritage, with paintings, sculptures, and art objects selected for their historical, artistic, and documentary value. Among the main collections are:

==== Paulucci di Calboli Collection ====
It includes sculptures by the Milanese artist Adolfo Wildt, an exponent of Symbolism and Art Nouveau, donated by Marquis Raniero Paulucci di Calboli. The works, of strong expressive intensity, testify to the artist’s plastic and spiritual research.

==== Righini Collection ====
It includes paintings and sculptures of the modern period, including works by Giorgio Morandi, Filippo de Pisis, Massimo Campigli and other protagonists of 20th-century Italian painting. The collection reflects the collecting taste and cultural commitment of the donors Arturo and Ada Righini.

==== Pedriali Collection ====
A collection of twenty-eight artworks covering a time span from the 17th to the 19th century. This collection, donated to the city by Giuseppe Pedriali in 1932, offers insight into the taste and cultural customs of the time. The works include paintings by artists such as Jacques Sablet, Rachel Ruysch, Giambattista Tiepolo and Alessandro Magnasco, and are displayed on the ground floor of the complex.

=== Verzocchi Collection ===
The Verzocchi Collection is a unique set of paintings on the theme of labor, commissioned by entrepreneur Giuseppe Verzocchi between 1949 and 1950. It includes over seventy works created by Italian artists of the 20th century, each accompanied by a self-portrait and a written reflection on the meaning of work. Artists represented include Giorgio de Chirico, Renato Guttuso, Carlo Carrà, Mario Sironi, Massimo Campigli, Enrico Prampolini, Emilio Vedova, Giuseppe Capogrossi, Achille Funi, Ottone Rosai, Filippo de Pisis, Bruno Saetti, Aligi Sassu, Armando Spadini, Pio Semeghini, Fausto Pirandello and many others. The collection, previously exhibited at Palazzo Romagnoli, has been rehoused at the San Domenico Museum since 2025.

== Temporary exhibitions ==
=== Painting and sculpture ===
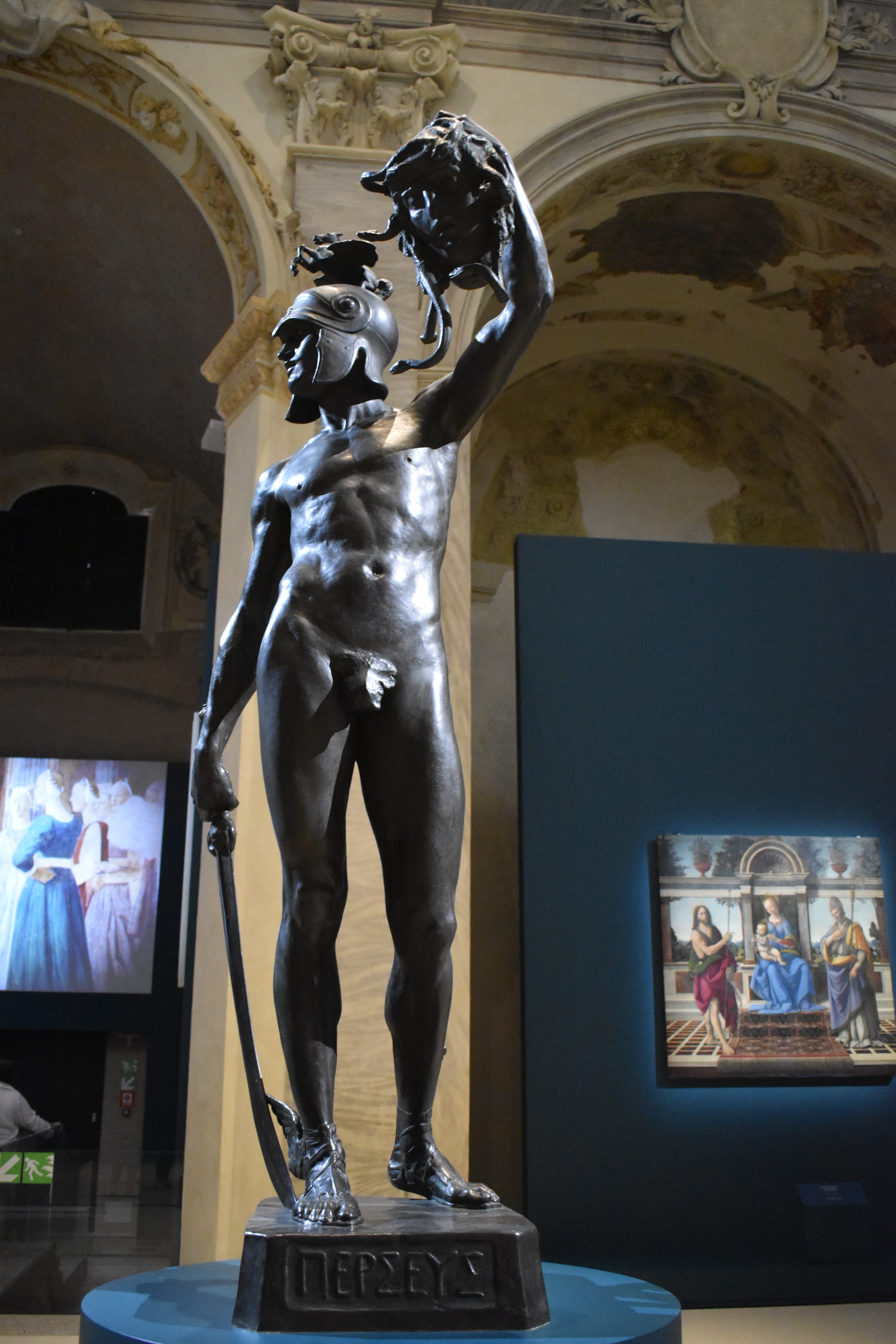
Exhibition "Pre-Raphaelites" (2024)

- "Marco Palmezzano - The Renaissance in Romagna" (from 4 December 2005 to 30 April 2006).
- "Silvestro Lega, the Macchiaioli and the 15th century" (from 14 January to 24 June 2007).
- "Guido Cagnacci - Protagonist of the 17th century between Caravaggio and Reni" (from 20 January to 22 June 2008, inaugurated by the Prime Minister of Italy Romano Prodi).
- "Maceo - Roman years 1934–1944" (from 21 September to 30 November 2008, works by Maceo Casadei).
- "Antonio Canova - The classical ideal between sculpture and painting" (from 25 January to 21 June 2009).
- "Flowers - Nature and symbol from the 17th century to van Gogh" (from 24 January to 20 June 2010).
- "Never-seen Egypt - The eternal dwellings of Assiut and Gebelein" (from 11 September 2010 to 9 January 2011).
- "Melozzo da Forlì - Human beauty between Piero della Francesca and Raffaello" (from 29 January to 12 June 2011).
- "Wildt - Soul and forms between Michelangelo and Klimt" (from 28 January to 17 June 2012).
- "Twentieth century - Art and life in Italy between the two world wars" (from 2 February to 13 June 2013).
- "Liberty – A style for Italy" (from 1 February to 15 June 2014).
- "EuroVisions - Tito Pasqui, a Forlì native at major exhibitions (1873–1906)" (from 10 October 2014 to 6 January 2015).
- "Boldini - The spectacle of modernity" (from 1 February to 14 June 2015).
- "Piero della Francesca - Investigating a myth" (from 13 February to 26 June 2016).
- "Art Déco - The roaring years in Italy" (from 11 February to 18 June 2017).
- "The Eternal and Time between Michelangelo and Caravaggio" (from 10 February 2018 to 17 June 2018, awarded the "Fifth Global Fine Art Awards" in the category "Best Renaissance, Baroque, Old Masters, Dynasties - Group or Theme").
- "Nineteenth century - The art of Italy between Hayez and Segantini" (from 9 February to 16 June 2019).
- "Odysseus - Art and myth" (from 15 February to 21 June 2020, then rescheduled from 19 May to 31 October 2020 due to the COVID-19 pandemic), awarded the "Global Fine Art Awards" in the "Best Ancient" category.
- "Dante - The vision of art" (from 30 July to 11 July 2021).
- "Magdalene. Mystery and image" (from 27 March to 10 July 2022).
- "The Art of Fashion" (from 18 March to 2 July 2023).
- "Pre-Raphaelites" (from 24 February to 30 June 2024).
- "The Portrait of the Artist - In the mirror of Narcissus. The face, the mask, the selfie" (from 23 February to 29 June 2025).
- "Baroque - The grand theater of ideas" (from 21 February to 28 June 2026).
- "Visions of the East. Japan and Japonisme from the Impressionists to Manga" (from 19 February to 27 June 2027)

=== Photography ===
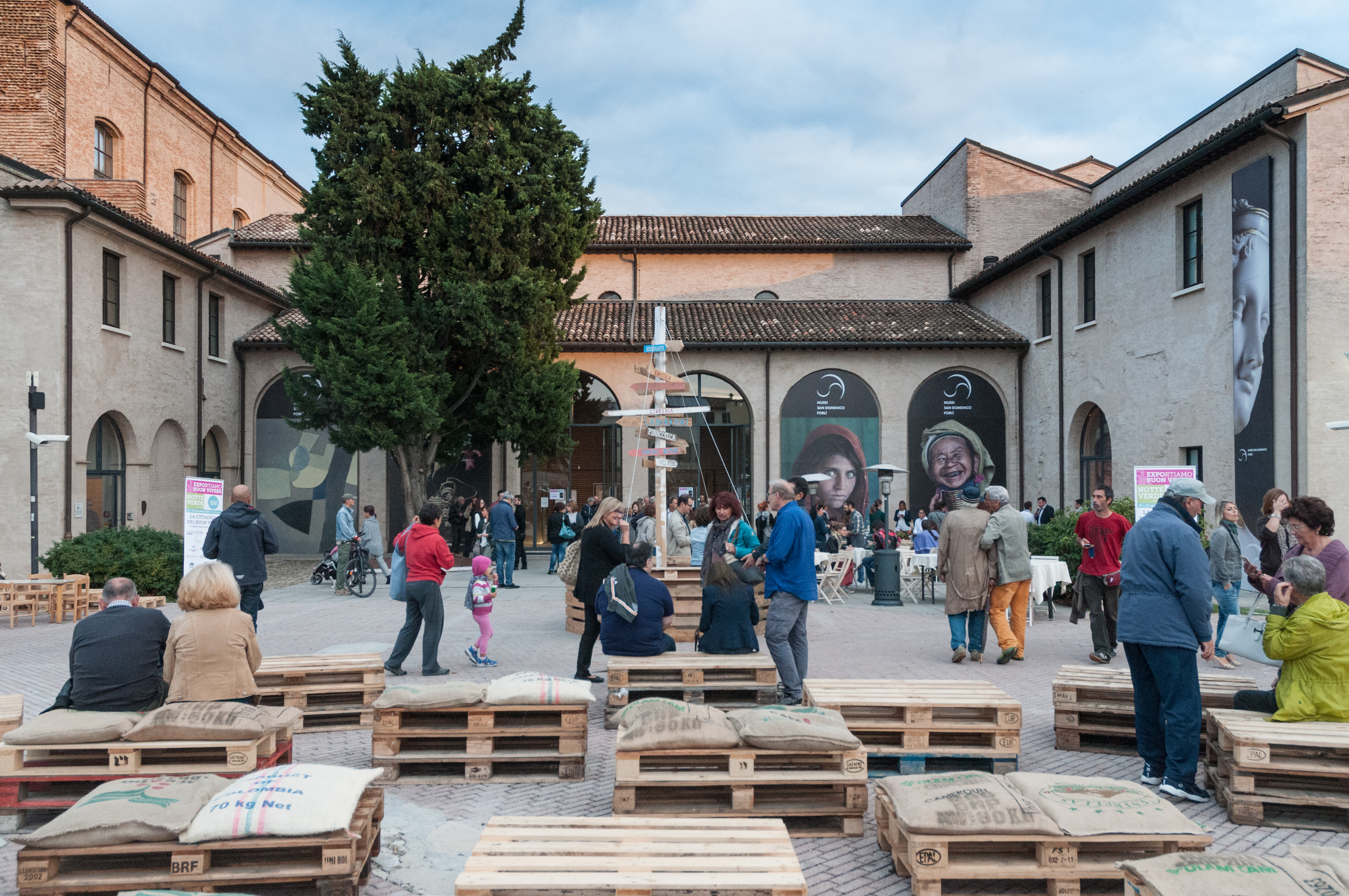
Opening of the exhibition dedicated to Steve McCurry (2015)

- "Steve McCurry - Icons and Women" (from 26 September 2015 to 10 January 2016).
- "Sebastião Salgado - Genesis" (from 28 October 2016 to 29 January 2017).
- "Elliott Erwitt - Personae" (from 23 September 2017 to 7 January 2018).
- "Ferdinando Scianna" (from 22 September 2018 to 6 January 2019).
- "The photography of Paolo Monti" (from 6 October 2018 to 6 January 2019).
- "Steve McCurry - Food" (from 21 September 2019 to 6 January 2020).
- "Being human - Great women photographers tell the world" (from 18 September 2021 to 30 January 2022).

== Awards and recognition ==
- 2019 – Global Fine Art Awards in the category Best Renaissance, Baroque, Old Masters, Dynasties - Group or Theme for the exhibition The Eternal and Time between Michelangelo and Caravaggio
- 2021 – Global Fine Art Awards in the category Best Ancient for the exhibition Odysseus. Art and myth
