= Forlivese school of art =

Italian Renaissance painting tradition based in Forlì

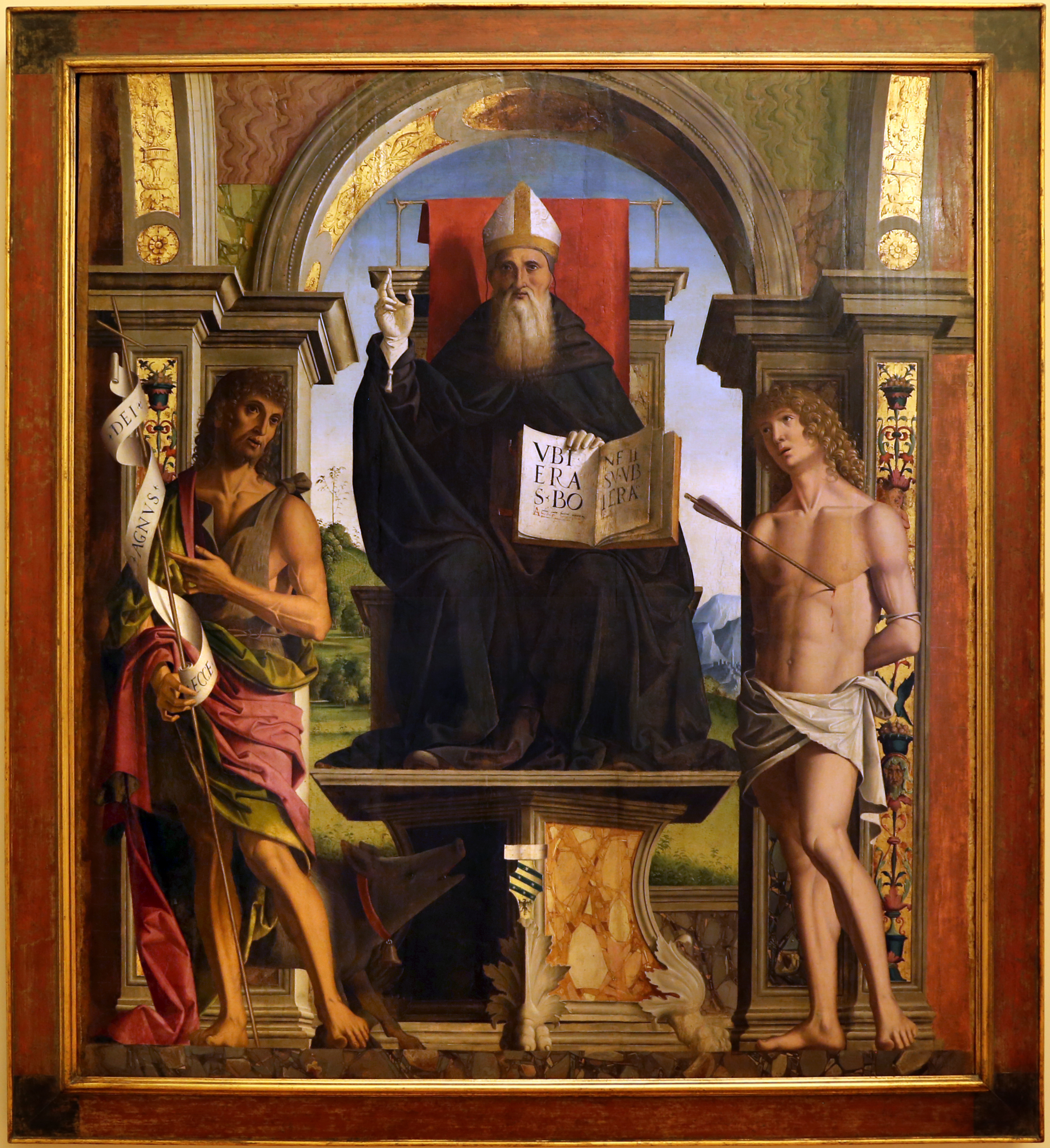
- Marco Palmezzano, Glorification of Saint Anthony Abbot enthroned between Saints John the Baptist and Sebastian (Pala Ostoli), 1496–1497
- Years active: 14th–16th centuries
- Location: Forlì, Romagna, Italy
- Major figures: Melozzo da Forlì, Marco Palmezzano, Baldassare Carrari, Francesco Menzocchi, Livio Agresti

The Forlivese school of art (Scuola forlivese) is a term used in art history for a local tradition of painting associated with Forlì and the surrounding territory of Romagna in northern Italy. It developed out of a late medieval artistic tradition and became particularly significant during the 15th and 16th centuries, within the broader Italian Renaissance.

The school is particularly associated with Melozzo da Forlì and his principal follower Marco Palmezzano. Their work combined a strong interest in linear perspective, monumental figure construction and spatial illusion with influences from Piero della Francesca, Andrea Mantegna and, in Palmezzano's case, contemporary Venetian painting.

== History ==
=== Early tradition ===
The origins of the Forlivese tradition are associated in older art historiography with the painter Guglielmo da Forlì, also known as Guglielmo degli Organi. His activity in Forlì is documented at the beginning of the 15th century, but the traditional identification of him as the founder of the local school is uncertain. Modern scholarship notes that no securely attributed works by Guglielmo are known and regards his supposed role as founder as a later historiographical construction.

Ansuino da Forlì is also relevant to the early history of the local tradition, although his documented career is more closely connected with Padua and the Paduan school. His surviving work and associations place him within the artistic milieu of northern Italy shaped by Filippo Lippi and Andrea Mantegna, while his possible role in Melozzo's early formation remains a matter of scholarly debate.

=== Melozzo da Forlì and Marco Palmezzano ===
Melozzo da Forlì (c. 1438–1494) was the most prominent Forlivese painter of the 15th century. His career took him to Urbino and Rome, where he developed a highly illusionistic approach to perspective and foreshortening. His Roman frescoes, including the decoration of the Vatican Library and the Basilica of Santi Apostoli, became important examples of Renaissance spatial illusionism.

Marco Palmezzano (c. 1459–1539) trained in Melozzo's circle and became the leading painter associated with Forlì during the late 15th and early 16th centuries. His early work adopted Melozzo's monumental figures and perspectival constructions, while later paintings incorporated elements derived from Giovanni Bellini, Cima da Conegliano and other Venetian painters. Palmezzano subsequently became a major figure in the artistic culture of Romagna.

Among Palmezzano's works in Forlì is the Pala Ostoli, painted in 1496–1497 for a chapel of the church of Santa Maria del Carmine. The altarpiece, depicting Saint Anthony Abbot enthroned between Saints John the Baptist and Sebastian, exemplifies the combination of perspectival architecture, monumental figures and landscape that became characteristic of the artist's mature style.

=== Sixteenth-century continuation ===
The tradition continued in the 16th century through painters who adapted the earlier Forlivese language to new artistic developments. Baldassare Carrari, active in Forlì and Ravenna from the late 15th century until 1516, combined local influences associated with Palmezzano and Niccolò Rondinelli with elements of the wider Romagnol and northern Italian traditions.

Francesco Menzocchi (1502–1574) was born in Forlì and became an important figure in the later development of local painting. He initially copied works by Rondinelli and Palmezzano and later trained with Girolamo Genga, whose influence contributed to his transition toward the forms of Mannerism.

Livio Agresti (1508–1580), a pupil of Menzocchi, carried the Forlivese tradition into the Mannerist period. Although much of his mature career was spent in Rome, he maintained connections with Forlì and produced works for the city's churches and civic collections.

Livio Modigliani (c. 1535–c. 1606), a pupil of Pier Paolo Menzocchi, represents a later continuation of the local tradition into the late 16th and early 17th centuries. His works combine Mannerist influences with the requirements of Counter-Reformation art and remained closely connected with churches in Forlì and the surrounding Romagna.

== Characteristics and influences ==
Forlivese painting is particularly associated with the construction of convincing pictorial space. Melozzo developed a forceful use of perspective and foreshortening, while Palmezzano applied these principles to altarpieces that combine architectural settings, monumental figures and carefully organized landscapes.

The school was not stylistically isolated. Palmezzano's mature work incorporated elements from contemporary Venetian painting, especially that of Bellini and Cima da Conegliano, while other Forlivese painters absorbed influences from Ferrara, Urbino and central Italy. These exchanges were especially visible in the transition from the late Quattrocento to the 16th century.

== Principal artists ==
- Guglielmo da Forlì (Guglielmo degli Organi) — an early figure traditionally regarded as a founder of the local school, although his role and surviving oeuvre are uncertain.
- Ansuino da Forlì — a 15th-century painter associated primarily with Padua but relevant to the early Forlivese milieu and the presumed formation of Melozzo.
- Melozzo da Forlì (c. 1438–1494) — the central figure of the 15th-century Forlivese tradition.
- Marco Palmezzano (c. 1459–1539) — Melozzo's principal follower and the leading Forlivese painter around the turn of the 16th century.
- Baldassare Carrari (c. 1460–1516) — active in Forlì and Ravenna and influenced by Palmezzano and Niccolò Rondinelli.
- Francesco Menzocchi (1502–1574) — a leading 16th-century painter whose work developed from local models toward Mannerism.
- Livio Agresti (1508–1580) — a pupil of Menzocchi who continued the tradition in a strongly Mannerist direction.
- Livio Modigliani (c. 1535–c. 1606) — a later Forlivese painter whose career extended into the early 17th century.

== See also ==
- Italian Renaissance painting
- Cenacolo Artistico Forlivese
- Mannerism
- Forlì
