= Antonio Santarelli (archaeologist) =

Italian archaeologist

Antonio Santarelli (22 April 1832 in Forlì – 12 August 1920) was an Italian archaeologist.

A member of the Governing Commission of Fine Arts, royal inspector of excavations and monuments, and director of the Pinacoteca and civic museums of his birthplace of Forlì. He carried out several digs in the outskirts of his town, at Villanova, Vecchiazzano and other sites, wrote many works of history and archaeology and founded the nucleus of what would become the National Archaeological Museum at Sarsina. The Museo Civico Archeologico at Forlì, which he founded and formed, is named after him and, among others, houses stone finds from Montepoggiolo, among the oldest from Europe. He and his brother Apelli were great philanthropists and benefactors, founding a map archive and children's asylum bearing their name.
