= Germano Sartelli =

Italian sculptor (1925–2014)

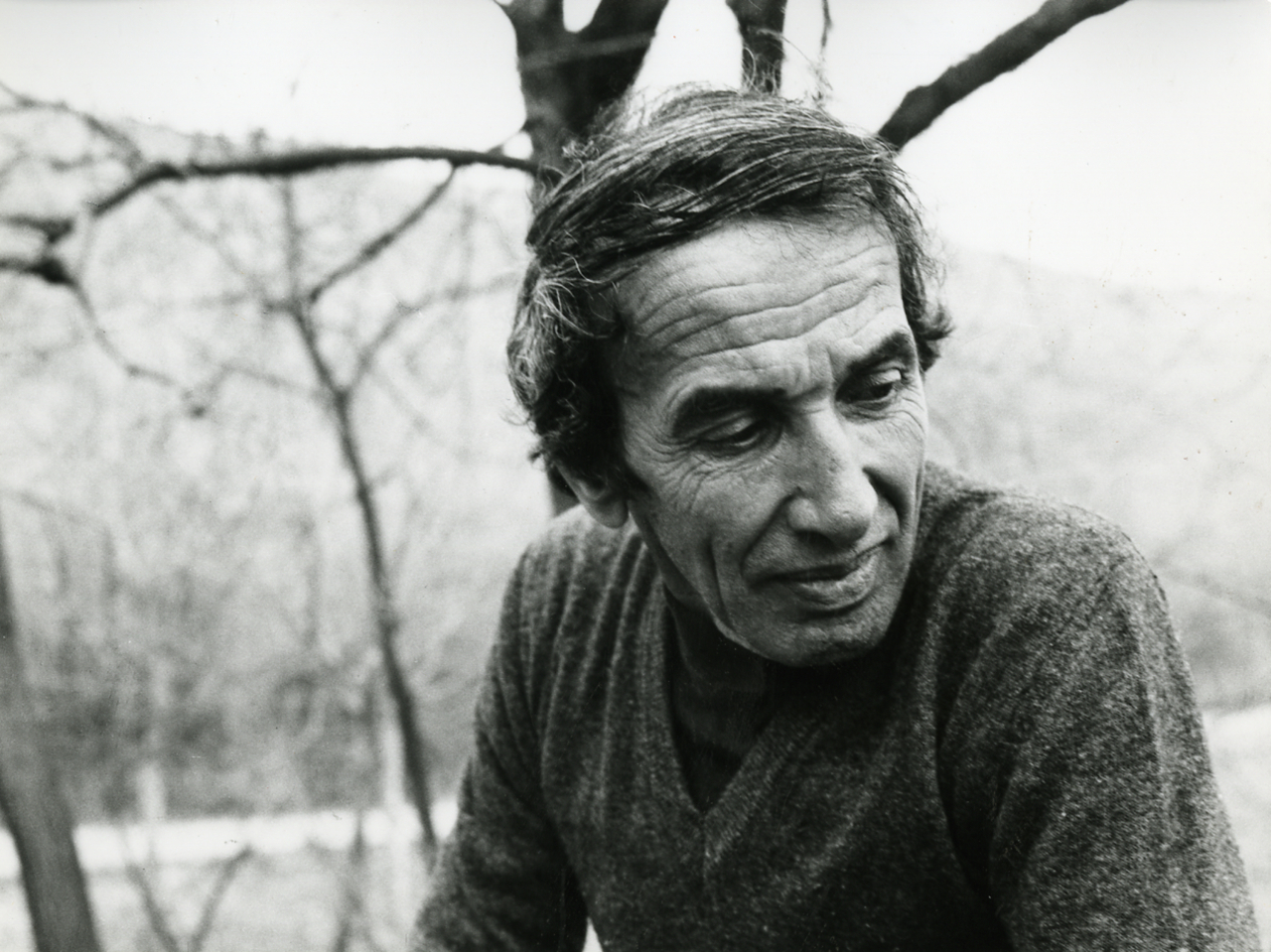
- Germano Sartelli photographed in 1975 by Paolo Monti
- Born: 1925
- Died: 2014 (aged 88–89)
- Known for: Sculpture

Germano Sartelli (1925 – 2014) was an Italian sculptor.

== Life ==
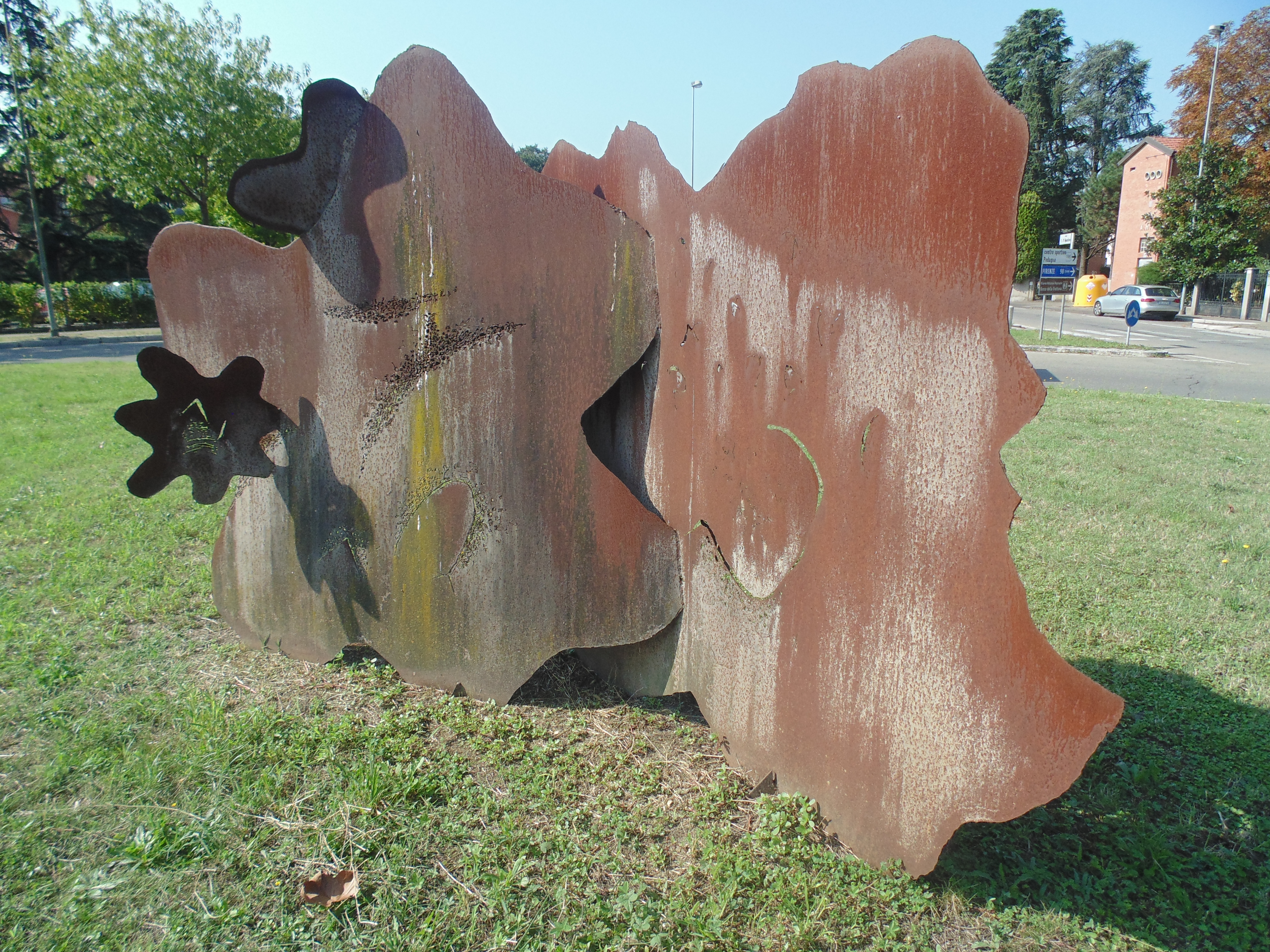
Sheet metal sculptures by Germano Sartelli, Imola

He was born in Imola in 1925.

After attending a wood carving course that it was held between the 30s and 40s by Gioachino Meluzzi, Sartelli devoted himself with passion to sculpture so he opened an atelier in the little town of Codrignano. The signature of his works has always been the use of recycled materials ranging from newspaper pages to metal wires and timber.

His first exhibition in 1958 was organized by Dino Gavina at the Cultural Club in Bologna with a presentation by Maurizio Calvesi.

In 1962 he was awarded the sculpture prize by the Ministry of Public Education (Italy) and in 1964 he exhibited at the 32nd Venice Biennale which was followed by numerous other personal and non-solo exhibitions.

In the fifties, Sartelli started a project at the Luigi Lolli Provincial psychiatric hospital in Imola to teach painting to patients whose creations were exhibited in an exhibition in Imola in 1954: it was the first time in Italia. The pioneering experience of art therapy was also narrated in a 2006 documentary.

In the same year of his death in 2014, the documentary film written and directed by Paolo Fiore Angelini Germano Sartelli. La forma delle cose, conversazioni was released in which the artist talks about himself.

Among others Maurizio Calvesi, Andrea Emiliani, Claudio Spadoni and Roberto Daolio. The archival collection is kept at the Museo San Domenico in Imola.

Germano Sartelli's works photographed by Paolo Monti

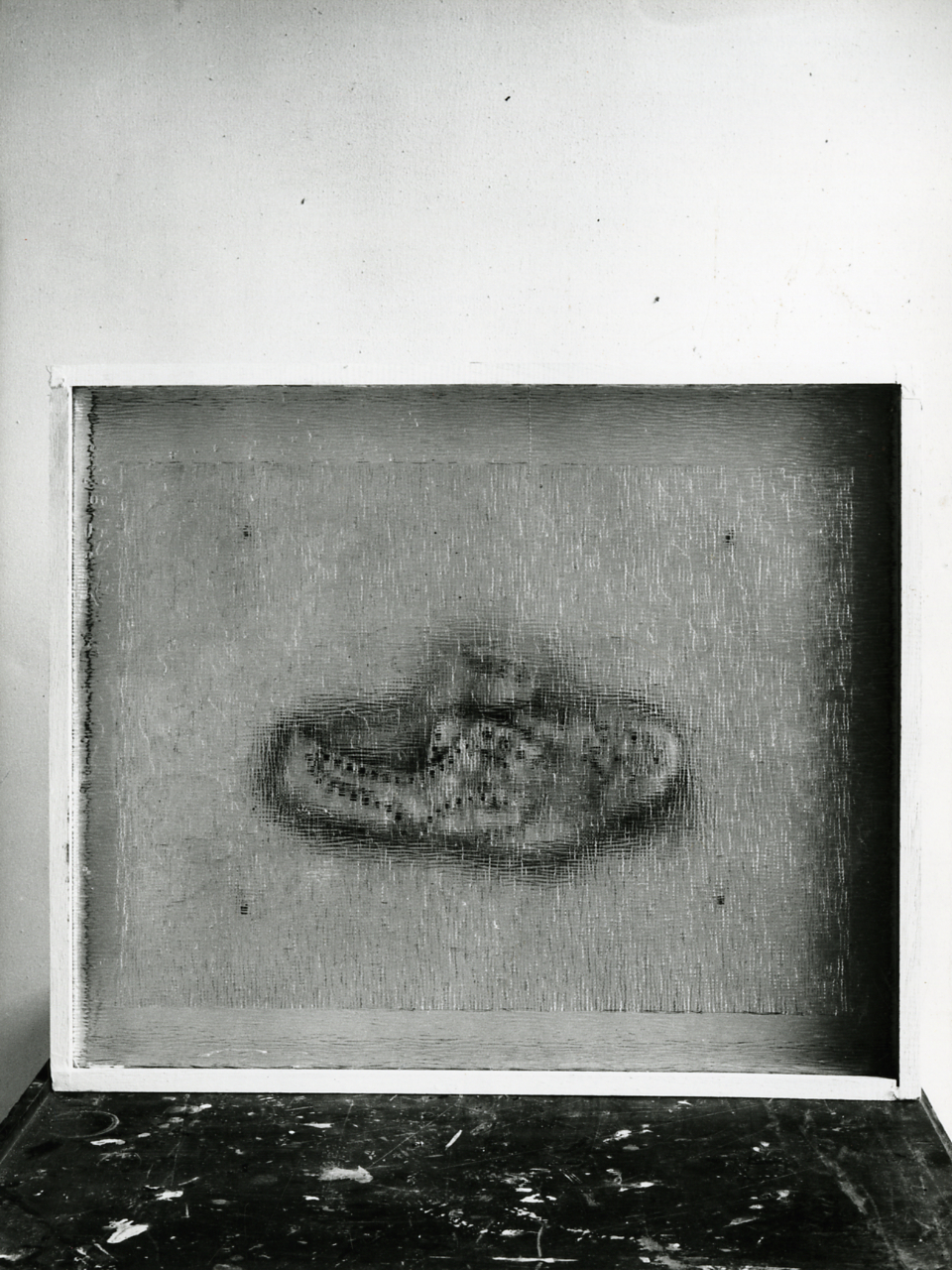

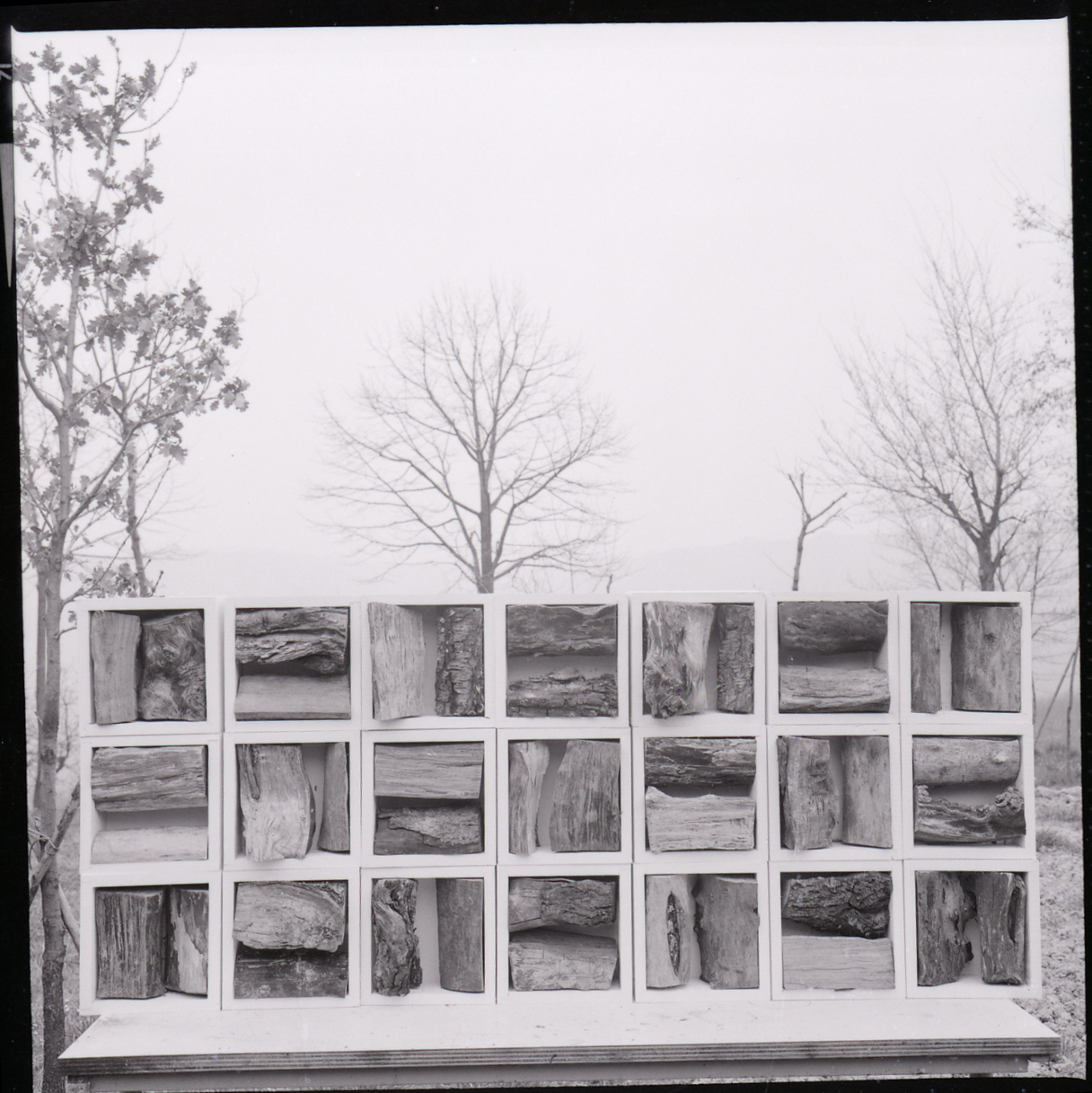

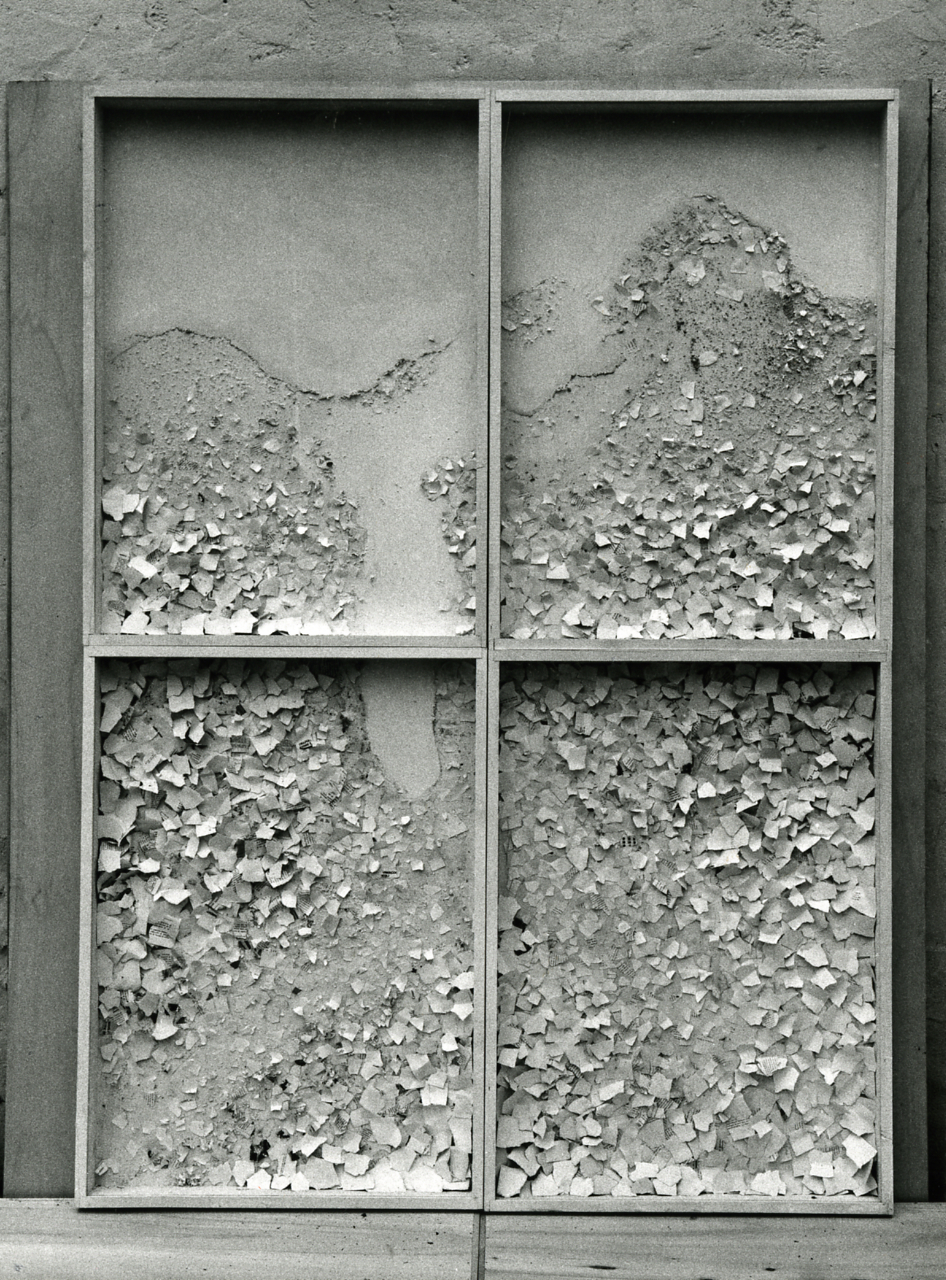

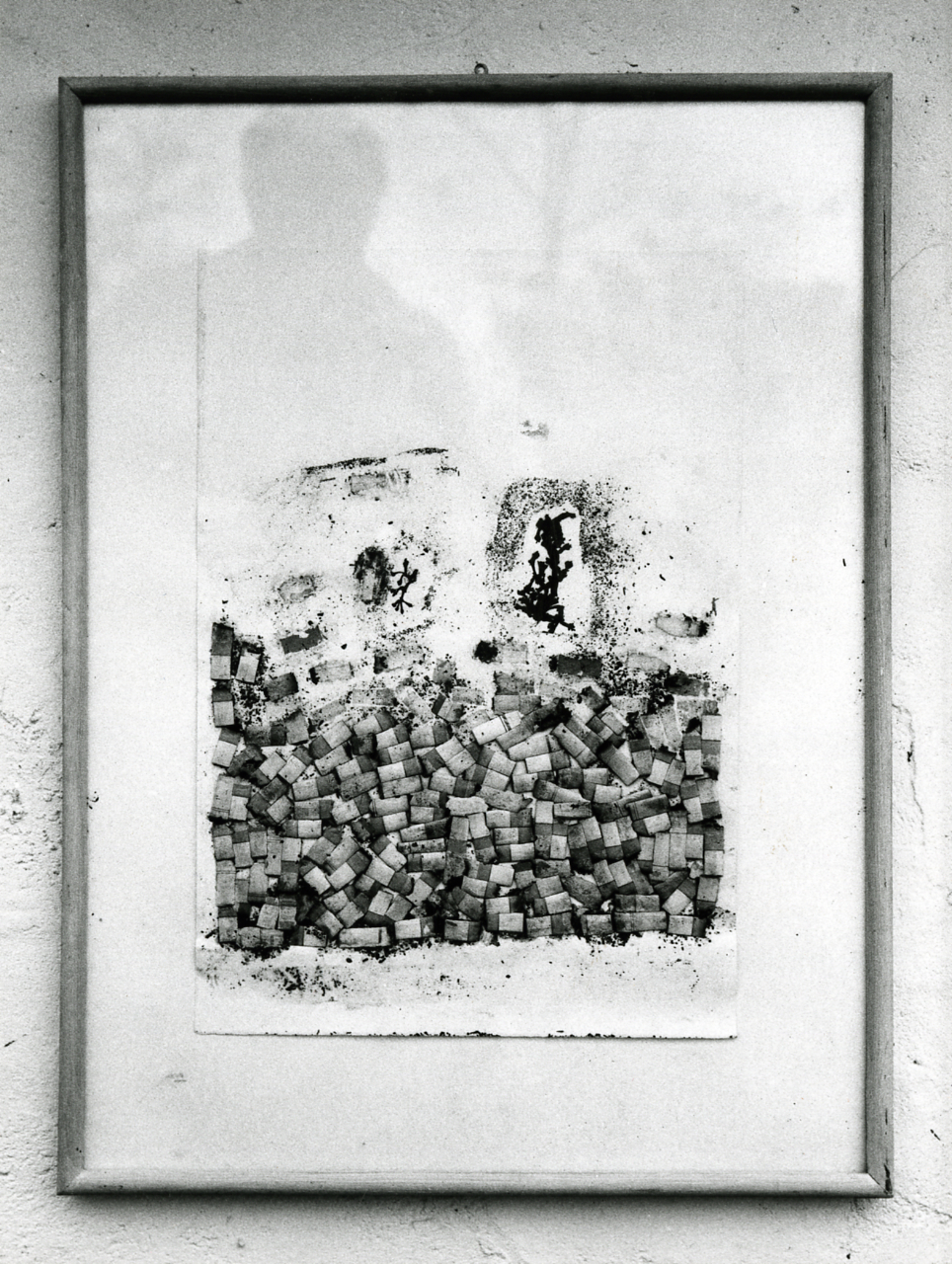

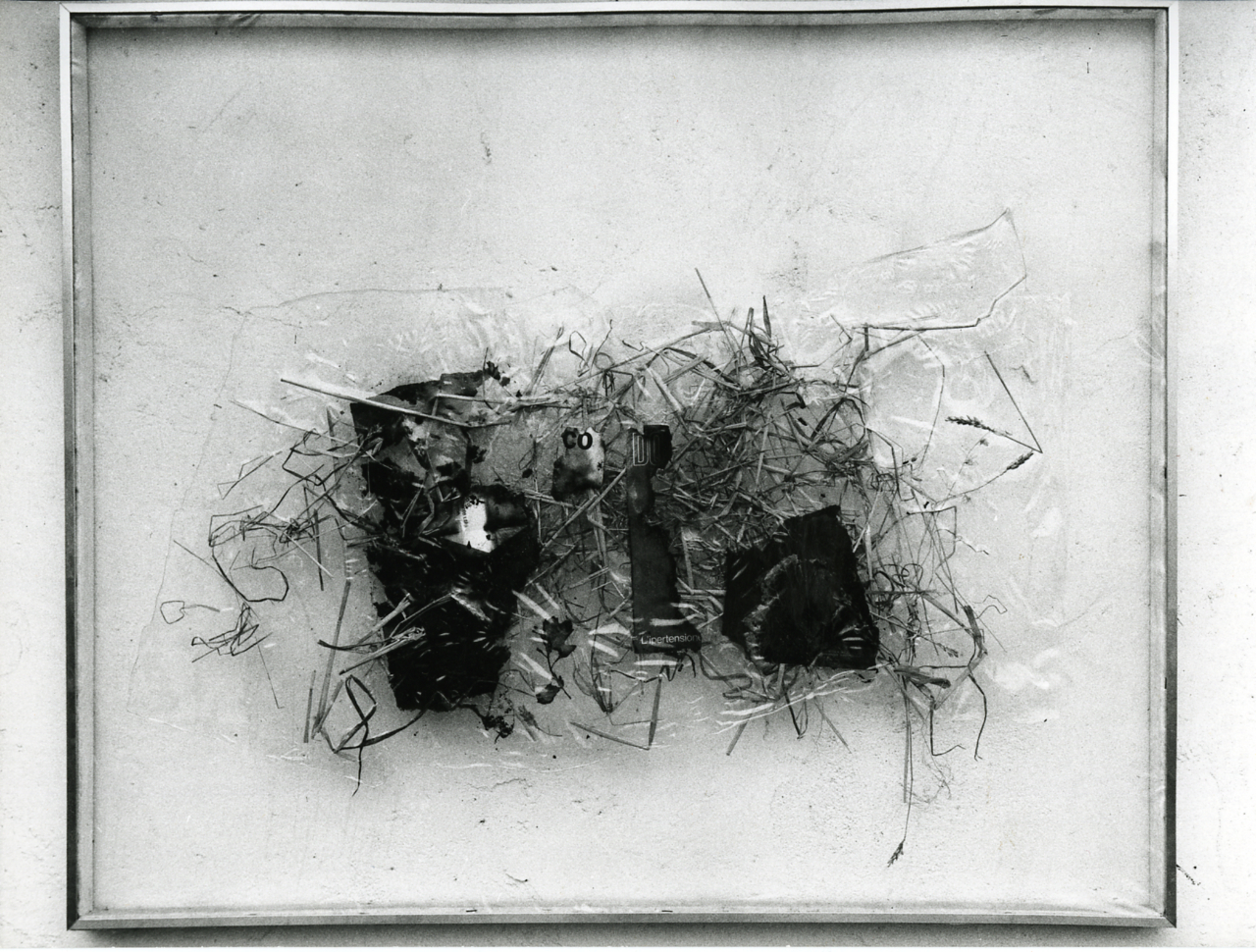

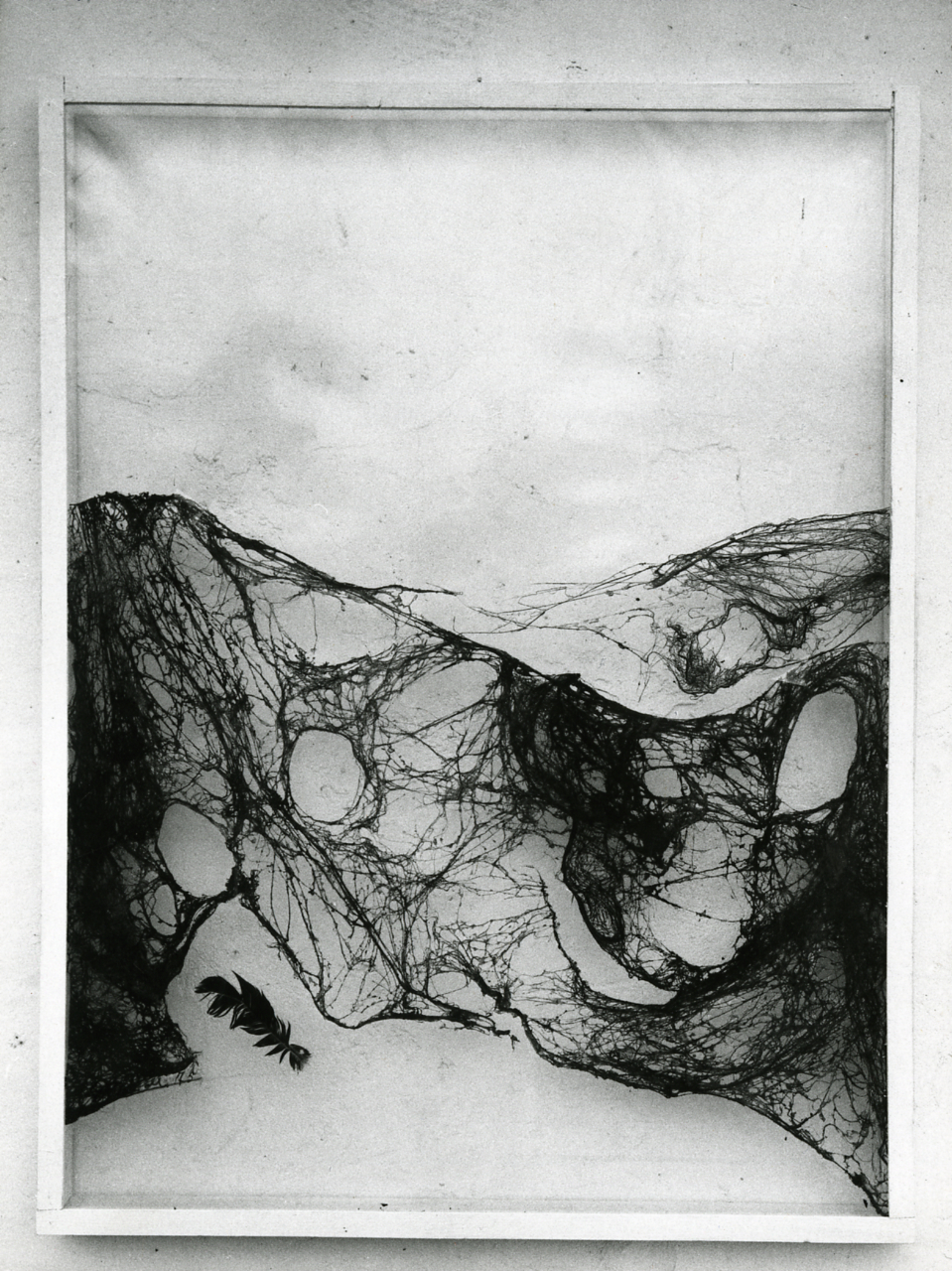

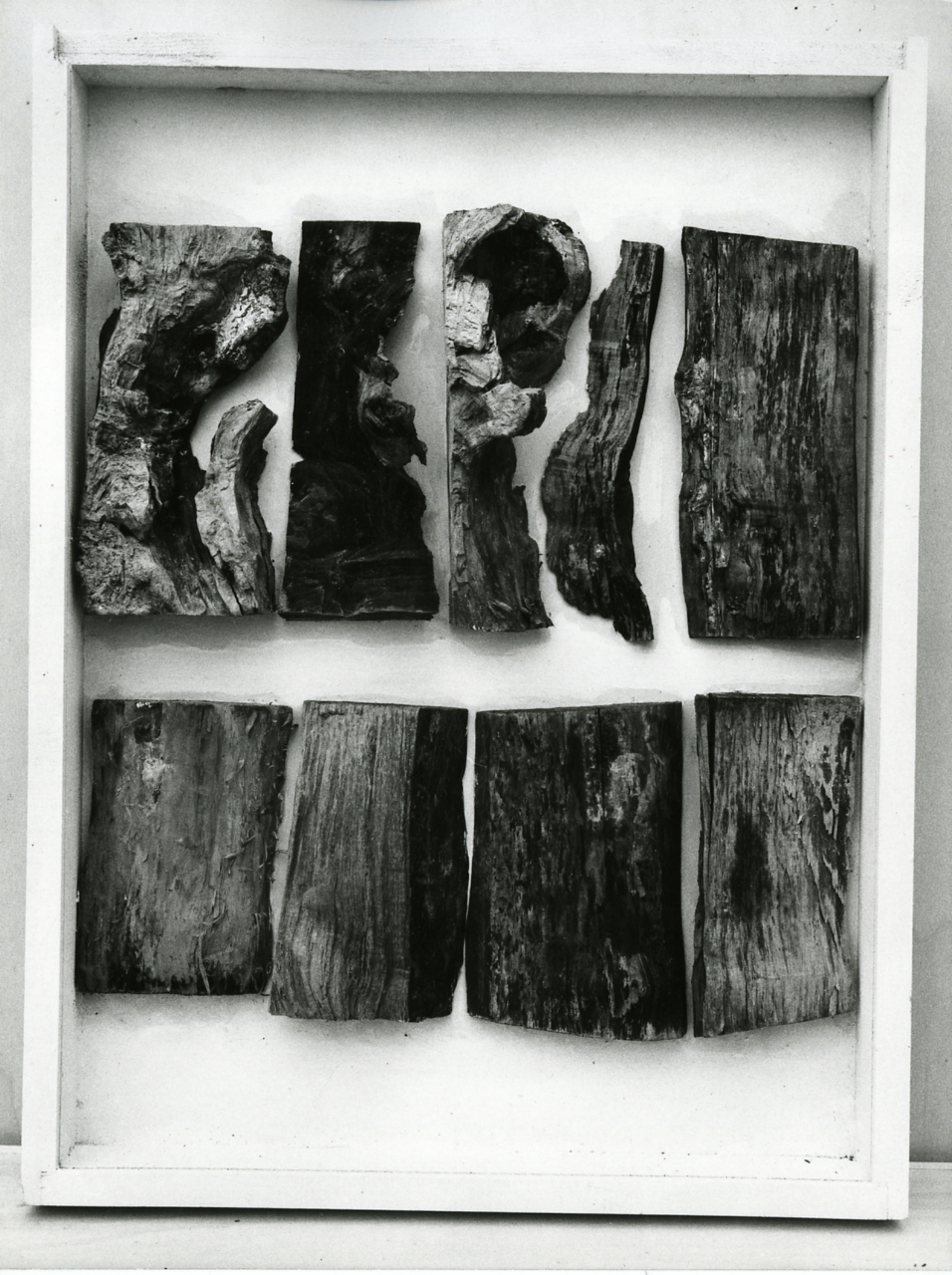
