= Baldassarre Carrari =

Baldassarre Carrari may refer to:

- Baldassarre Carrari the Younger (Baldassarre Carrari il Giovanni) (c. 1460–1516)
- Baldassarre Carrari the Elder (Baldassarre Carrari il Vecchio) (14th-century)
