= Pinacoteca Civica di Forlì =

The Pinacoteca Civica of Forlì, one of the civic museums of Forlì and currently based in the Musei di San Domenico, is an Italian art gallery. Artists whose work the gallery exhibits include:

- Livio Agresti
- Clemente Alberi
- Beato Angelico
- Nicola Bertucci
- Guido Cagnacci - the museum recently acquired (2005) his work "Allegoria dell'Astrologia sferica"
- Antonio Canova
- Baldassarre Carrari
- Giovanni Crivelli
- Domenichino
- Giovanni Fattori
- Guercino
- Lorenzo di Credi
- Carlo Magini
- Girolamo Marchesi
- Melozzo da Forlì(?)
- Francesco Menzocchi
- Livio Modigliani
- Giorgio Morandi
- Marco Palmezzano
- Adolfo Wildt

It contains the Verzocchi collection of 20th-century Italian painting.
