= Dead Christ =

Dead Christ may refer to:

- Dead Christ (Annibale Carracci), or Corpse of Christ
- Dead Christ (Holbein), or The Body of the Dead Christ in the Tomb
- Dead Christ (Mantegna), or Lamentation of Christ
- Dead Christ (Palmezzano)
