= Civic museums of Forlì =

The civic museums of Forlì - today housed in Corso della Repubblica and elsewhere - are the:

- Musei di San Domenico - headquarters
- Pinacoteca - sited at the former
- Biblioteca
- Collezione Verzocchi
- Collezione Pedriali
- Gipsoteca
- Monetiere Piancastelli
- Museo Archeologico Antonio Santarelli
- Museo Etnografico
- Museo del Risorgimento
- Museo del Teatro
- Museo Ornitologico
- Museo della Ceramica
- Armeria Albicini
- Museo della Ginnastica, housed at the Casa del Balilla during works beginning in 2009
