= Cesena Cathedral =

Roman Catholic church in Italy

Cesena Cathedral Cattedrale di San Giovanni Battista
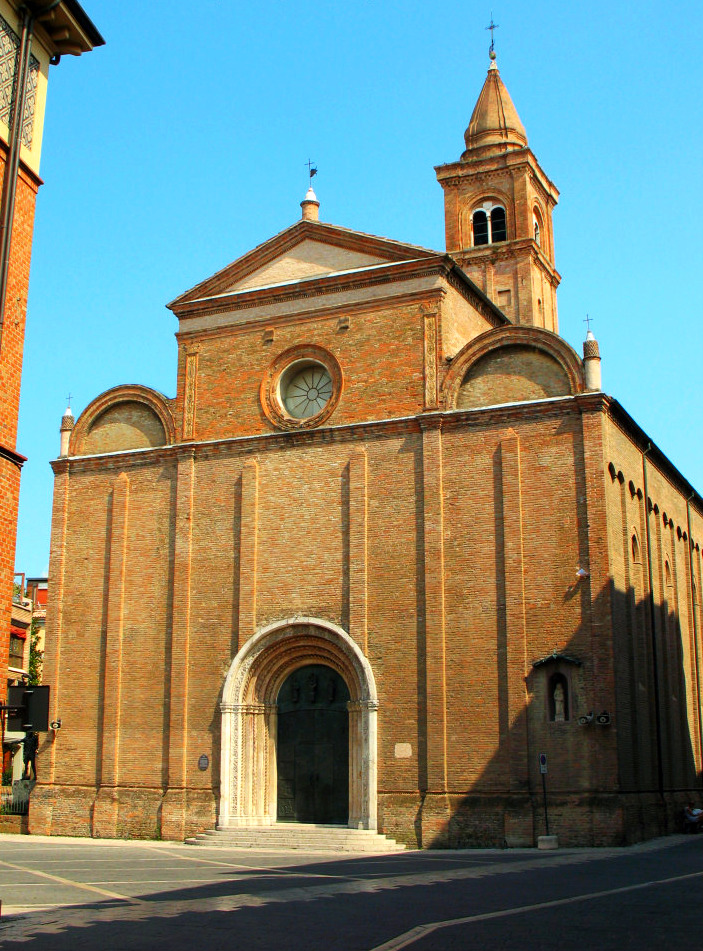
- Façade of Cesena Cathedral

Religion
- Affiliation: Roman Catholic

Location
- Location: Cesena, Italy
- Interactive map of Cesena Cathedral; Cattedrale di San Giovanni Battista
- Coordinates: 44°08′14.87″N 12°14′43.09″E

Architecture
- Architect: Undervaldo
- Type: Church
- Style: Romanesque-Gothic
- Groundbreaking: 1385
- Completed: c. 1404

Cesena Cathedral (Italian: Duomo di Cesena, Cattedrale di San Giovanni Battista) is a Roman Catholic cathedral dedicated to Saint John the Baptist in the city of Cesena, Italy. It has been the episcopal seat of the present Diocese of Cesena-Sarsina since 1986, and was previously that of the Diocese of Cesena.

The building of the cathedral, to replace an older one, was authorised by a papal bull of Pope Urban VI in 1378. The works started in 1385 and were paid for by the generosity of Andrea Malatesta, the lord of the city. The building was completed around the year 1405. The construction, in Romanesque-Gothic style, is attributed to the architect Undervaldo (probably Swiss).

The campanile (bell tower) was built between 1443 and 1457 to designs by the Maso di Pietro and funded by Bishop Antonio Malatesta da Fossombrone (bishop of Cesena from 1435 to 1475).

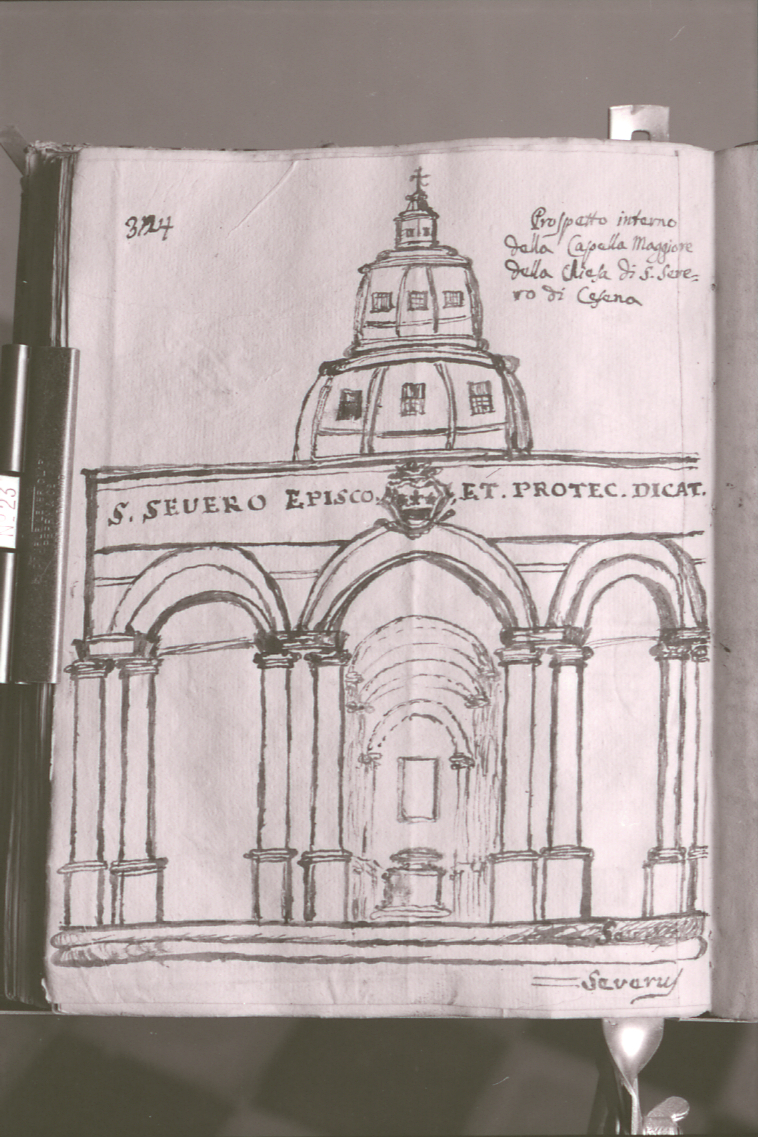
Ancient drawing of the destroyed church of San Severo in a photo by Paolo Monti, 1972.

The same Bishop Malatesta was responsible for the building of the Bishop's Palace adjoining the cathedral, which was completed by his successor Giovanni Venturelli (1475–1486).

After the radical rebuilding of the 1960s the only surviving original part of the structure is what remains of the door on the eastern side. Also dating from the Renaissance period is the Chapel of Saint Tobias next to the cathedral, now in use as the cathedral museum. However, the old hospital of the same name which gave assistance to pilgrims no longer exists.

The façade of the cathedral was completed only at the end of the 15th century with works attributed to the Venetian architect Mauro Coducci (1440–1504).

The mortal remains of Saint Maurus of Cesena (d. 946) are preserved here, in the Altar of Saint John, one of the greatest sculptures of Cesena produced between 1494 and 1505 by the Lombard sculptor Giovanni Battista Bregno da Osteno.

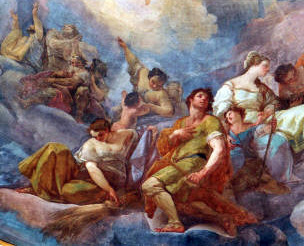
Fresco by Corrado Giaquinto

Inside the cathedral a small painting on a copper plate by the Mannerist Livio Agresti depicting Saint John has been returned.

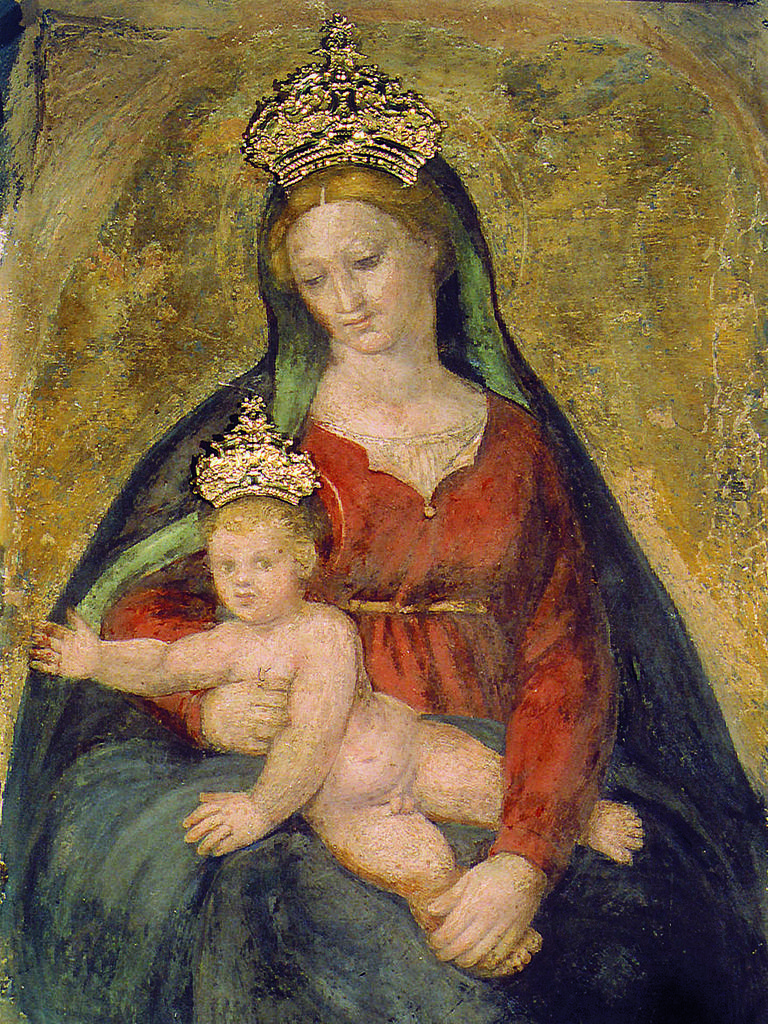
The painting of the Madonna del Popolo that was personally crowned by Pope Pius VI in 1782.

In the Cappella della Madonna del Popolo ("Chapel of the Madonna of the People") are frescoes by Corrado Giaquinto dating from 1750, and the painting was personally crowned by the Pope Pius VI on 3 June 1782, the first occasion in papal history.
