= Ansuino da Forlì =

15th-century Italian painter

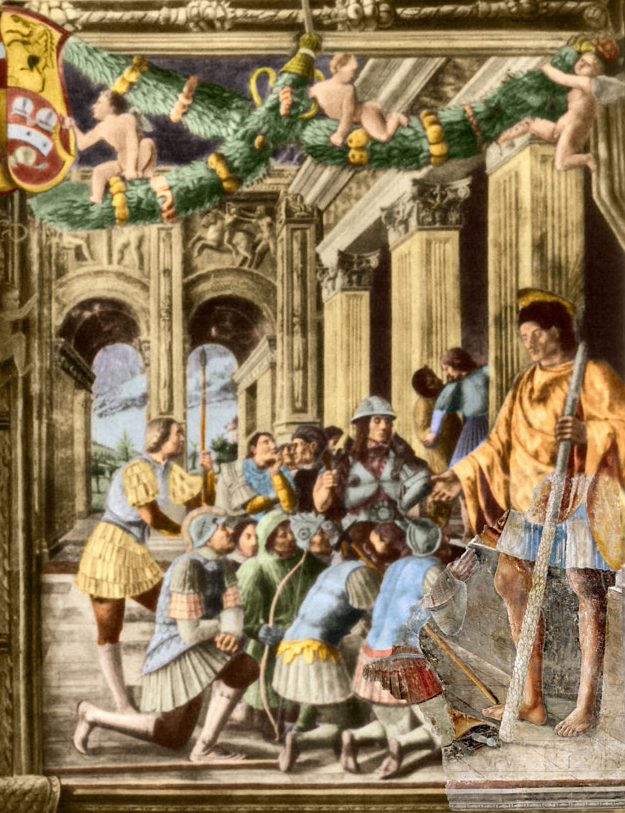
Reconstruction of the St. Christopher Preaching in the Ovetari Chapel (the surviving fragment can be seen in the lower right corner).

Ansuino da Forlì was an Italian painter of the Quattrocento period. Born and active in Forlì and Padua in the mid-15th century, he was a member of a Forlì painting school and influenced the great Melozzo da Forlì.

He trained with Squarcione and worked with Andrea Mantegna in the Ovetari Chapel for the church of the Eremitani in Padua.
