= Livio Agresti =

Italian painter

Livio Agresti (1508–1580), also called Ritius or Ricciutello, was an Italian painter of the late Renaissance or Mannerist period, active both in his native city of Forlì and in Rome, where he died. He was one of the members of the "Forlì painting school".

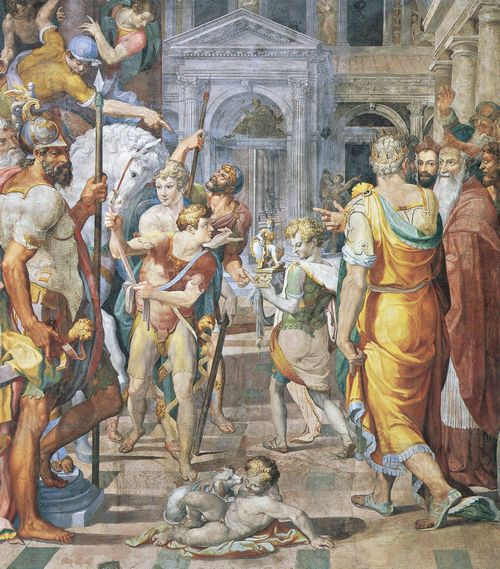
Peter of Aragon gives kingdom to Pope Innocent III (fresco, Sala Regia of the Vatican Palace).

== Biography ==
Initially a pupil of Francesco Menzocchi, in 1535 he painted the frescoes of the Eucharist and the Prophets for the Chapel of the Sacrament in Forlì Cathedral, now in the local art gallery, the Pinacoteca Civica di Forlì. In 1539, he painted in the Church of Santa Maria dei Servi. In 1542, he travelled to Ravenna, where he painted the canvas of Bishops now kept in Ariani Cathedral. He joined the Roman Accademia di San Luca in 1534. In 1544, he painted the frescoes of allegorical figures in the Sala Paolina of the Castel Sant’Angelo in Rome, under the supervision of Perin del Vaga. Agresti also helped decorate the church of Santa Maria in Cosmedin in Rome.

In 1555–6, he decorated the Gonzaga Chapel in the Church of Santo Spirito in Sassia with biblical scenes, and returned in 1574 to decorate the Chapel of the Trinity with more scenes from the New Testament.

The most recently discovered work of Agresti came to light in June 2009 in Cesena Cathedral, an oil on copper in depicting the patron saint of the city, Saint John the Baptist, assigned to the old master by Alex Cavallucci.

The Church of St John Maddermarket in Norwich has a large oil canvas of The Last Supper which, although attributed to Agresti, has no verifiable provenance.

One of his pupils was Litardo Piccioli.

== Works ==
- Cesena: Cesena Cathedral
- Rome: Church of Santo Spirito in Sassia
- Rome: Church of Santa Caterina dei Funari
- Rome: Oratorio del Gonfalone
- Rome: Church of Santa Maria della Consolazione
- Tivoli: Villa d'Este, where he had the direction of decoration at the noble floor.
- Vatican: Sala Regia (Vatican)
- Forlì: Pinacoteca (Museum)
- Roncofreddo: Pieve di Santa Paola with two frescoes: Madonna and Child and Saint Catherine of Alexandria
- Terni: Terni Cathedral
- Amelia: Church of San Giovanni Decollato ("Saint John Beheaded") or dell'Ospedaletto ("of the Hospital")
- Narni: Pinacoteca (museum)
- Bergen, Norway: Bergen Art Museum ("Autumn Allegory")
- Approval of the Rules of the Franciscan Order by Pope Innocent III in 1209
- Saint Catherine Disputing with the Philosophers
- Design for a Spandrel: A Roman Martyr and Two Putti–Saint Jude the Apostle
- Design for a Salt Cellar or a Table Fountain
