= Guglielmo da Forli =

Italian painter

Guglielmo da Forli, called Guglielmo degli Organi, was an Italian painter active in Forlì in the 14th century.

== Biography ==
He was putatively either a pupil or follower of Giotto, and painted frescoes in the churches of San Domenico and the Franciscans in his native city. He is considered the founder of the Forlivese school of art in the early Renaissance. His frescoes were said to have influenced Melozzo da Forli. A Madonna delle Grazie in the Forli Cathedral is attributed to Guglielmo.

The dates of his life are generally unknown. Guglielmo is said to have been born sometime in the first half of the 14th century and continued to paint until 1408. According to Vasari, in Forli he was a pupil of the painter Vespignano, who like Giotto died circa 1336.
