= Niccolo Rondinelli =

Italian painter (c. 1468 – c. 1520)

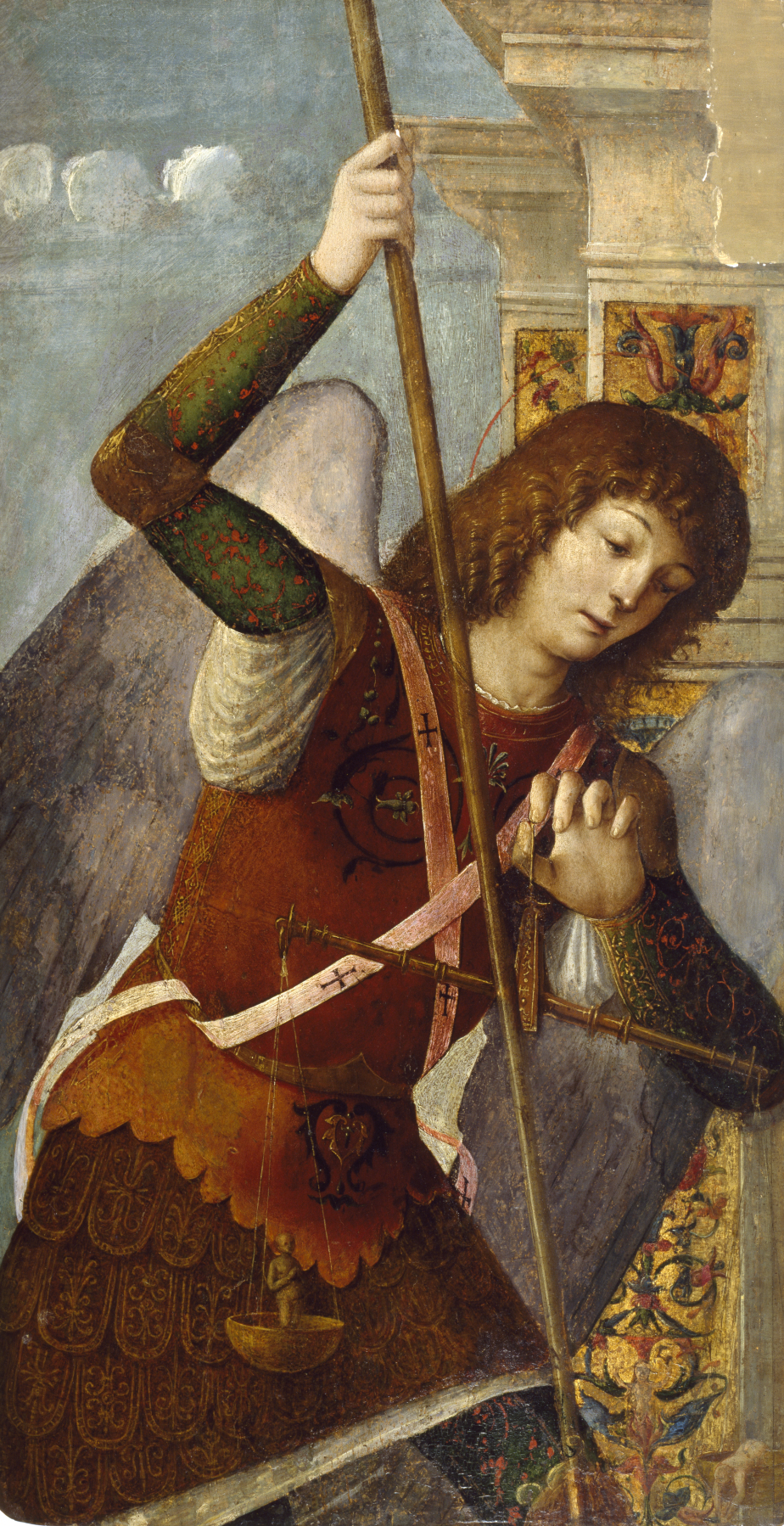

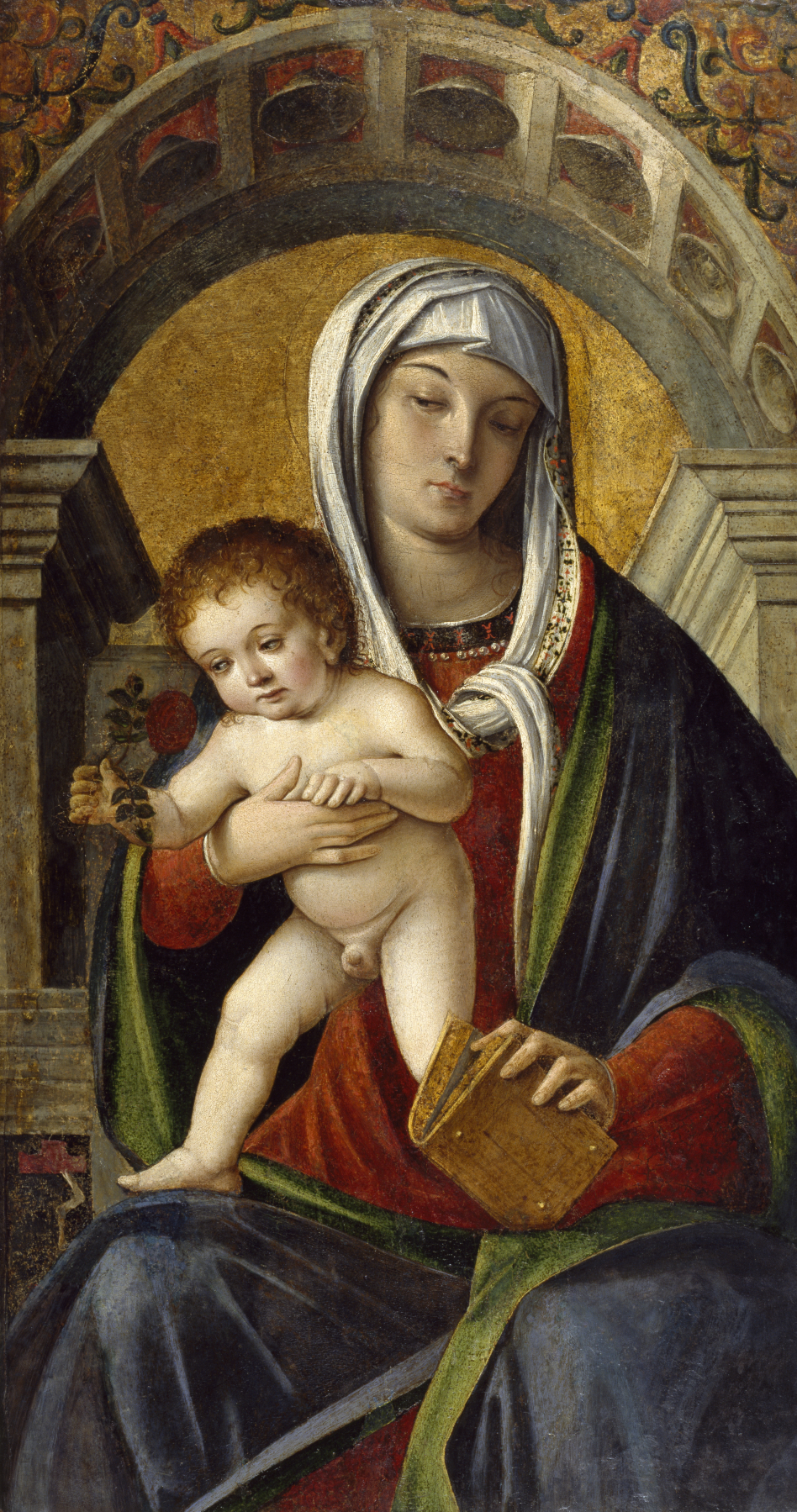

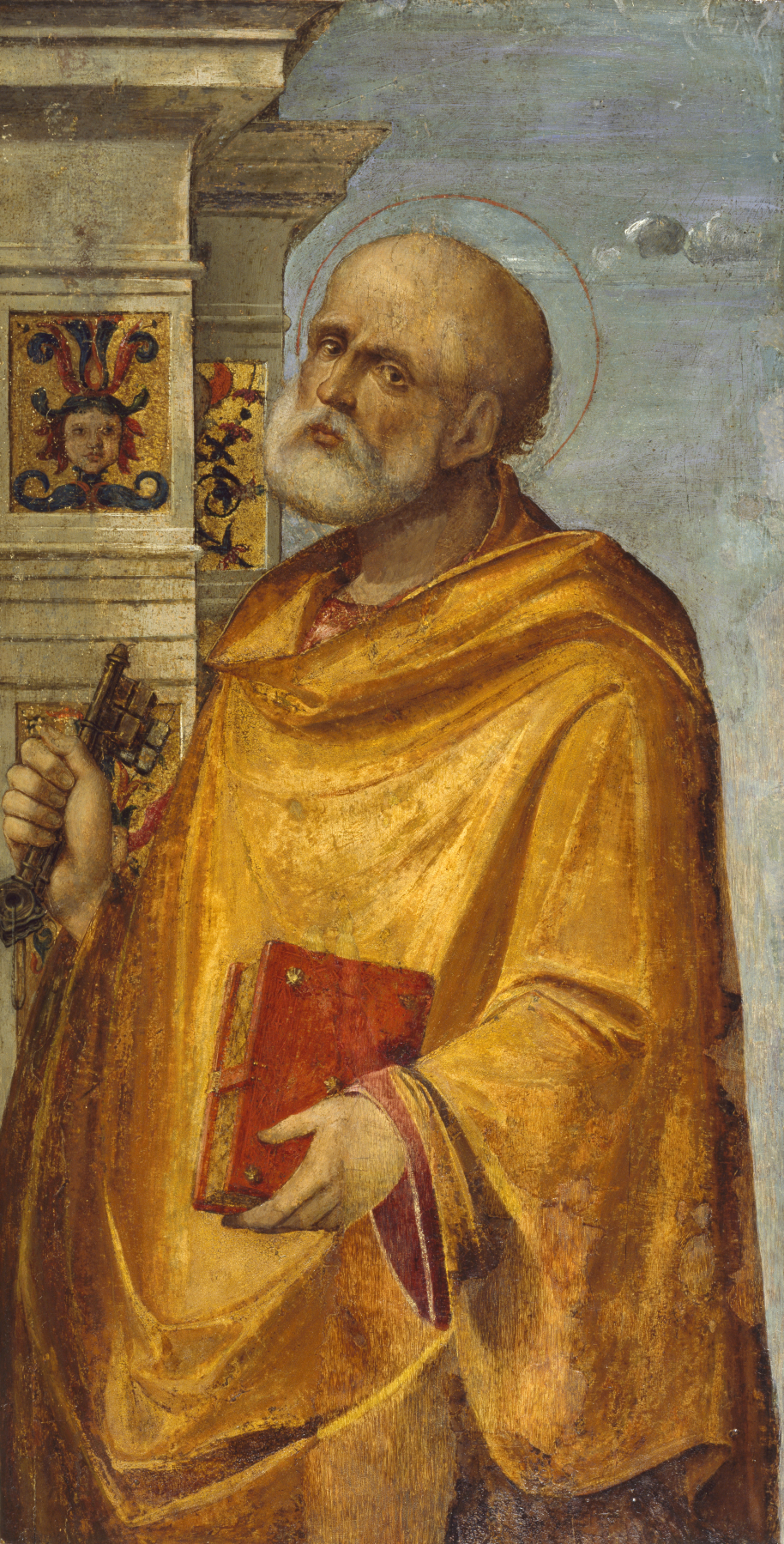

Triptych with Madonna and Child Enthroned Between the Archangel Michael and Saint Peter by Nicolò Rondinello in Walters Art Museum

Niccolò Rondinelli (c. 1468 – c. 1520) was an Italian painter of the Renaissance period, active mainly in Ravenna, where he was born. He was a pupil of the painter Giovanni Bellini. Also called Nicolo or Niccoló Rondinello. Among his pupils were Baldassare Carrari and Francesco da Cotignola.
