= Baldassarre Carrari the Elder =

Italian painter

Baldassarre Carrari the Elder (il Vecchio) was an Italian painter who worked at Forlì about the year 1354.

== Biography ==
He is supposed to be the author of a fragment of a series of paintings which once adorned the Santa Maria in Schiavonia church. That which remains is now in the gymnasium at Forlì, and represents the Adoration of the Magi and figures of Saints Peter, Jerome, Paul, Augustin, three figures, and two horses, "creations that do more honor to the school of Giotto in these parts than any assigned to the artists named by Vasari". He was a relative of Baldassarre Carrari the Younger.

The position of Carrari between Guglielmo degli Organi and Melozzo da Forli in the Forlivese school of painting is unclear. He is reputed by some to be the pupil of the former and master of the second, but the dates would be difficult to account. His Gothic style is said to approximate far more the former than the latter.

== See also ==
- Baldassare Carrari, a painter b. circa 1460
