= Baldassare Gabbugiani =

Italian engraver

Baldassare Gabbugiani was an Italian engraver. He executed some of the plates for the Museo Fiorentino, published at Florence between the years 1747 and 1766.
