= Adolfo Wildt =

Italian sculptor (1868–1931)

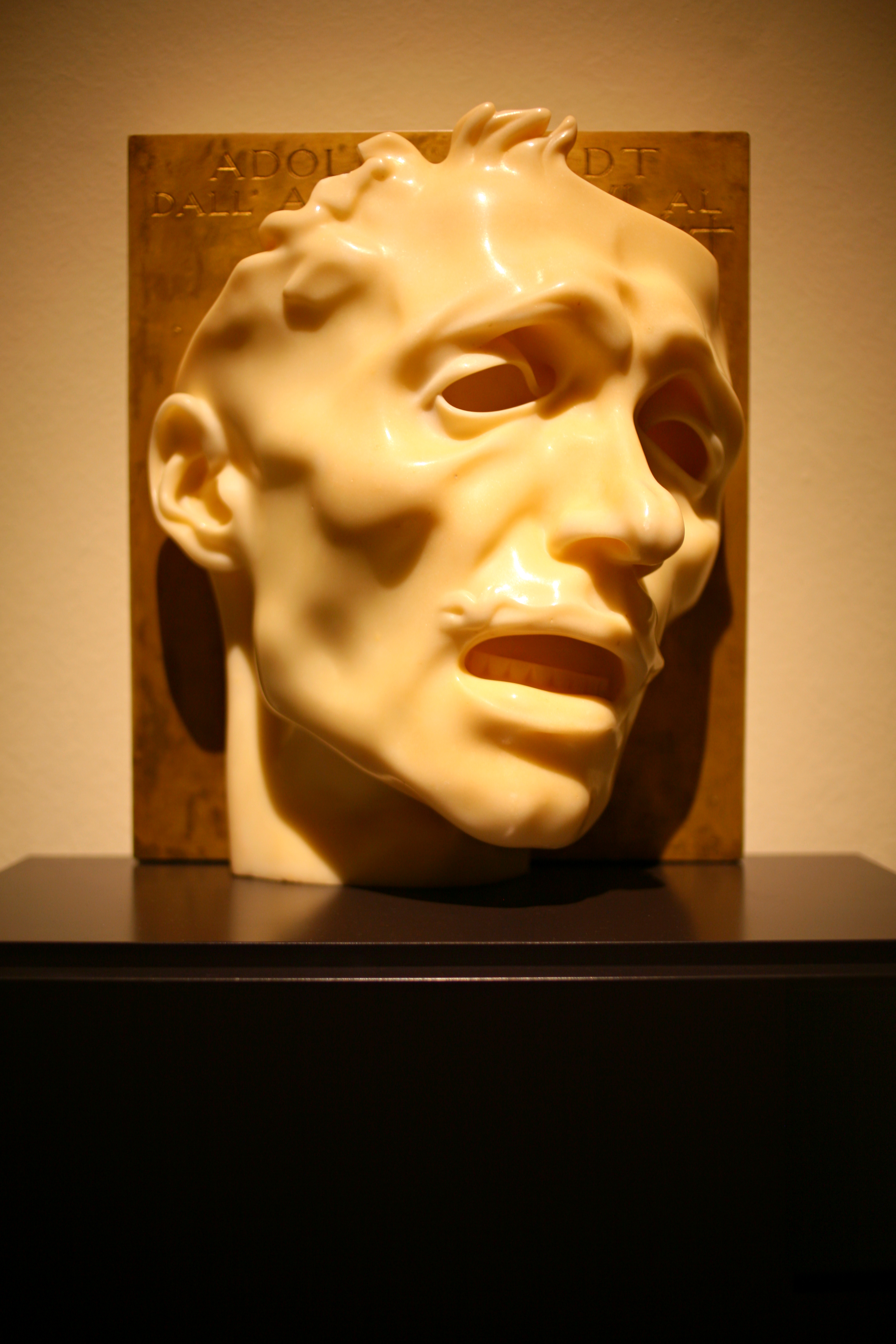
- Self portrait (1909)
- Born: 1 March 1868; Milan, Italy
- Died: 12 March 1931 (aged 63); Milan, Italy
- Education: Brera Academy
- Known for: sculpture
- Movement: Modernism

Adolfo Wildt (1 March 1868 – 12 March 1931) was an Italian sculptor. He is mostly known for his marble sculptures, which blend simplicity and sophistication, and paved the way for numerous modernist sculptors.

== Early life ==
Wildt was born in Milan to a Swiss family who had settled in Lombardy. He left school at age nine to work as a hairdresser and then as a goldsmith. At eleven he began an apprenticeship in the workshop of Giuseppe Grandi, who introduced him to the craft of sculpting marble. His technical ability made him popular within art circles by the age of eighteen. In 1888 he started to work as an assistant for sculptor Federico Villa. Wildt's interest in art eventually led him to reprise his education, and he enrolled in the Brera Academy of Fine Arts.

== Early career ==
In 1893 he exhibited his first work, a portrait of his wife, at the Permanent Society for Fine Arts in Milan. The piece was immediately purchased by the Galleria Nazionale d'Arte Moderna in Rome. From 1894 Wildt worked for Franz Rose, a Prussian collector and arts patron, with whom he signed a contract for a period of eighteen years. With Rose's support, Wildt immersed himself in his work, participating regularly in exhibitions in Milan, Munich, Zurich, Berlin and Dresden. Adolf von Hildebrand and Auguste Rodin were fascinated with Wildt's work and praised him for the experimental way in which he gave his marble sculptures a quality of opalescent transparency.

== Later career ==
After the death of Rose in 1912, Wildt lost a significant source of income and was forced for the first time to deal with the art market. In 1913, he was awarded the Premio Principe Umberto for his design for the fountain exhibited at The Trilogy of Secession in Monaco. (It was then exhibited in the courtyard of the Humanitas Society in Milan. From 1914 onwards his work was included in many international exhibitions. In 1921, 1924 and 1926 he was invited to show his work at the Venice Biennale. In 1921 he founded his Marble School in Milan and authored a book, The Art of Marble published by Hoepli. In 1927 Wildt's school was incorporated into the Brera Academy as a three-year course. Among his most famous pupils were Lucio Fontana, Fausto Melotti and Luigi Broggini.

Wildt died in Milan in 1931.

== Artwork ==
Wildt's work presents a background in late nineteenth-century Romanticism. His sculptures were influenced by the Secession and by Art Nouveau and are characterized by complex symbolism and gothic forms. The smoothness of their surfaces gives his marble busts a purity and plastic integrity that coexists with an almost frenzied dramatic feeling. Wildt's interest in Expressionism is particularly evident in his self-portrait of 1908. A significant body of his work is in the collection of the Civic Museums of Forlì: Fulcieri Paulucci de' Calboli (1919), Saint Lucia (1926), St. Francis of Assisi (1926), Mask of Sorrow, or Portrait (1908–1909), Lux (1920), The Saint Fountain (1921), Protection of Children, or Little Ones (1918).

== Selected bibliography ==
- Daniele Astrologo Abadal, Adolfo Wildt, Silvana Editoriale, Milan, 2007. ISBN 978-8836609284
- Beatrice Avanzi, Ophélier Ferlier, Fernando Mazzocca, Adolfo Wildt: L'ultimo simbolista, Skira/Rizzoli, New York, 2015. ISBN 978-8857230924
