= Baldassare Cittadella =

Baldassare Cittadella (born in 1603 in Lucca, Italy, dead December 3, 1651 at sea outside Goa, India) was a Catholic China missionary belonging to the Society of Jesus. In 1635 he came to Macau, where he was principal for the seminar and especially got the responsibility for newly baptised Chinese. He died during a journey back to Rome.
