= Baldassare Palazzotto =

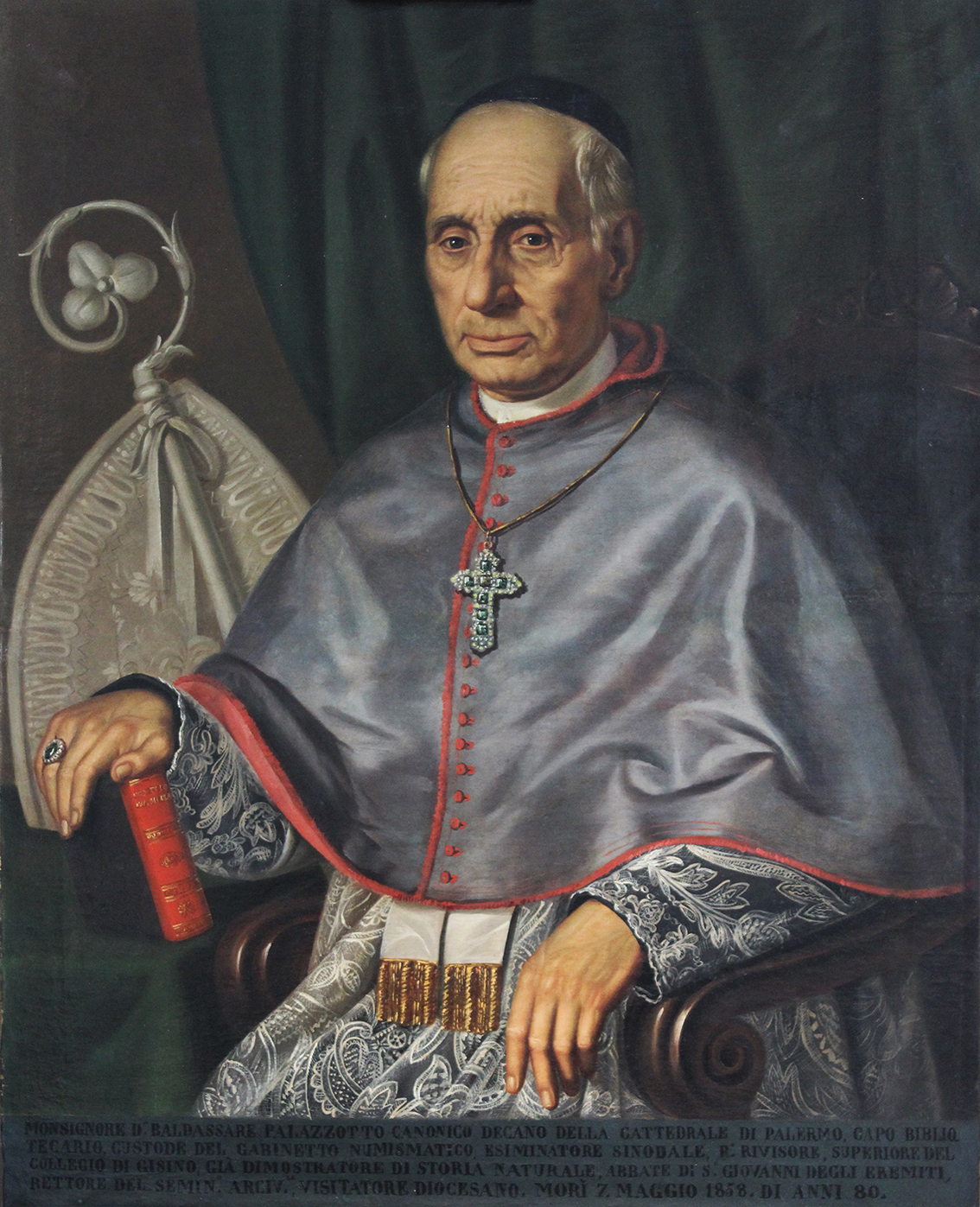
Portrait

Baldassare Palazzotto (1770 - 1858) was an Italian priest, bibliographer and one of the earliest ornithologists to study the birds of Sicily. Born in Palermo, he was the brother of the architect Emmanuel and came from a family of builders.

Palazzotto was born in the family of builders with royal patronage. His father was Salvatore Palazzotto (1751-1825) and their family, including Giuseppe Palazzotto had been active in Catania. Baldassare's brother Emmanuel (1798-1872) was a neogothic architect who designed the bell towers of the Cathedral of Palermo (1826-1835), parts of the Palazzo Lucchesi Palli di Campofranco, the Palazzo delle Reali Finanze and the Palazzo Forcella. Palazzotto became Canon at the Cathedral of Palermo and Canonical Abbot of San Giovanni degli Eremiti. He also served as a librarian in Palermo, a position he held until his death. He was elected spiritual peer of the Sicilian Parliament in 1848.

Palazzotto's natural history studies were principally on the birds of Sicily. He wrote down his observations which are preserved incomplete and this manuscript, the Trattato di Ornitologia siciliana was consulted by many including Andrea Bivona in 1840, Francesco Minà Palumbo in 1853 and Pietro Doderlein in 1869.
