= Baldassare Labanca =

Baldasarre Labanca (16 February 1832 – 22 January 1913) was an Italian Christian theologian and historian.

== Life ==
Baldasarre was born in Campobasso in Molise. His father, a merchant in town, ultimately had nine children. Baldassare was sent to apprentice with a maternal uncle who had liberal leanings, including connections with carboneria. He was enrolled in the Seminary of Trivento during 1843-1845, but upon the death of his father, he was sent to Naples to help with the family business. In Naples, he gravitated to the circle of Francesco de Sanctis, and thus in January through May 1848 participated in the brief attempt to establish constitutional government in Naples. This earned him a brief imprisonment by the Bourbon authorities.

Once released, he continued his education in theology but also in canonical law. In Agnone by 1853, he received ordination as a priest. In 1855, the abbot of Altamura awarded him a position teaching philosophy in the seminary. Uncomfortable in a religious habit, he was prompted by the revolutions of 1860, to publish a pamphlet urging that the papacy be stripped of temporal power, and be restricted to spiritual affairs. By 1861, he had written to the bishop of Trivento, for permission to go to Chieti to teach philosophy. There in Chieti, with the support of Luigi Settembrini and Bertrando Spaventa, no longer a priest, he was able to publish his first works on philosophy. In 1868, he moved to Bari, and in 1871 he was awarded a chair in philosophy at the Liceo Giuseppe Parini of Milan. While here, he was recruited by G.I. Ascoli to teach moral philosophy at the Scientific-Literary Academy. In 1874, he would publish a work about Hegelian philosophy, titled Della dialettica. After a brief stint in Naples, Baldasarre won in 1879 an appointment to the chair of moral philosophy at the University of Padua. He married his housekeeper, but she died a few year later. At Padua, his failure to adhere to Catholic dogma created both controversy and support. In 1883, he published a book on the 14th century theologian Marsilio da Padova. This was his first work towards becoming more of a historian of Christianity. He moved to a chair of moral philosophy at the University of Pisa. He then began publishing a history and analysis of early Christianity. In 1886, he took a position at the University of Rome teaching the history of Christianity.

In the competitive and political environment of Rome, he had intellectual counterparts including Antonio Labriola, Benedetto Croce and a young Giovanni Gentile. Baldasarre continued his work, often rescuing the contributions from nonconformist thinkers from prior centuries, such as Giambattista Vico and G.F. Finetti. he died in Rome and left his library to the Biblioteca Casanatense.

Edward Larber quoted Labanca in 1901: Religion for the University is a problem, not an axiom... the History of Religions must not be a poem or a psalmody ... it is not its duty to strike up the hymn of victory, nor to murmur the prayers of the dead to express this or that religious sentiment. Nor should the History of religions be an apology or a polemic: its task is not to exalt one religion at the expense of another. Lastly [it] should not be a theology, nor a philosophy.. it must be founded on the study of the sources and dominated by the interest of truth for truth's sake.
