= Baldassare Carrari =

Italian painter

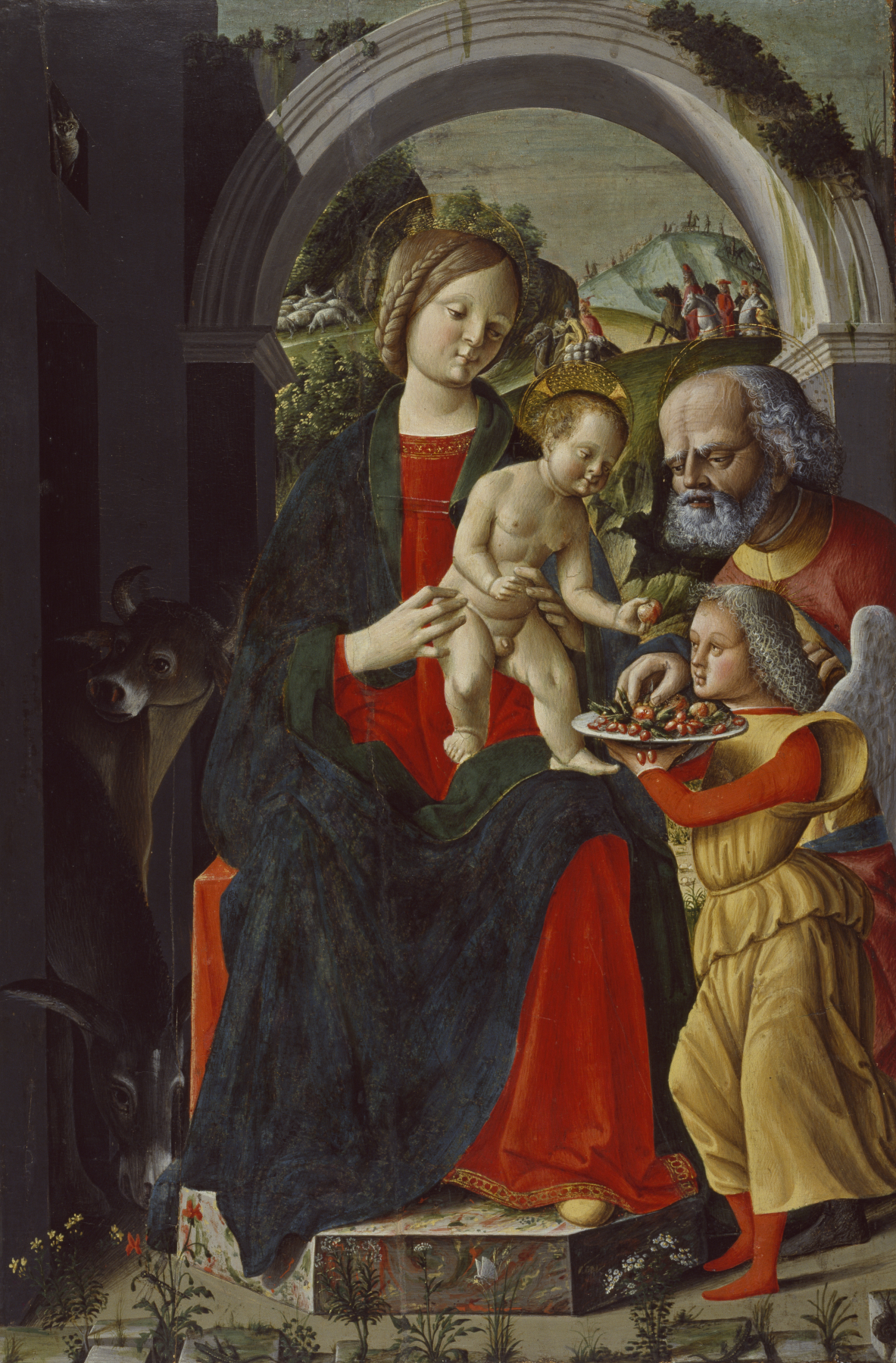
Holy Family with Angel

Baldassare Carrari (c.1460 in Forlì – 14 February 1516) or Baldassarre Carrari il Giovane was an Italian painter of the Renaissance period, active in both his native Forlì and Ravenna from 1486 till his death in his town of birth. He was a pupil of the painter Niccolò Rondinelli.

He was son of a Matteo, but a relative of Baldassarre Carrari il Vecchio (Baldassarre Carrari the Elder). Corrado Ricci considered him a distant follower of Melozzo da Forlì (died 1494 in Rome, perhaps through contacts with Melozzo's pupil, Marco Palmezzano, but also painting with a style influenced by Lorenzo Costa and Niccolo Rondinelli of Ravenna.

== Bibliography ==
- Farquhar, Maria (1855). Ralph Nicholson Wornum (ed.). Biographical catalogue of the principal Italian painters. London: Woodfall & Kinder. p. 150.
- The Borghese and Doria-Pamfili galleries in Rome, By Giovanni Morelli, page 265.
