= Marco Palmezzano =

Italian painter

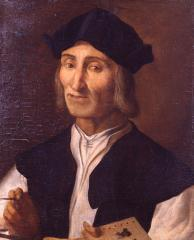
Marco Palmezzano, self-portrait

Marco Palmezzano (1460–1539) was an Italian painter and architect, belonging to the Forlì painting school, who painted in a style recalling earlier Northern Renaissance models. He was mostly active near Forlì.

== Biography ==
Palmezzano was born and died in Forlì, Romagna.

After his initial training with the painter Melozzo da Forlì — who had collaborated with Piero della Francesca and was widely esteemed as a master of perspective and foreshortening techniques— Palmezzano went to Rome in the early 1490s.

It is rumored that Palmezzano may have then traveled to Jerusalem to join the team painting frescoes at the Holy Cross church there, but no documentary evidence exists. He is, however, noted in property records as residing in Venice in 1495. Shortly thereafter, Palmezzano returned to Forlì, where he spent the rest of his long life—apparently with only brief excursions connected with commissions in other places in the region—until his death in 1539.

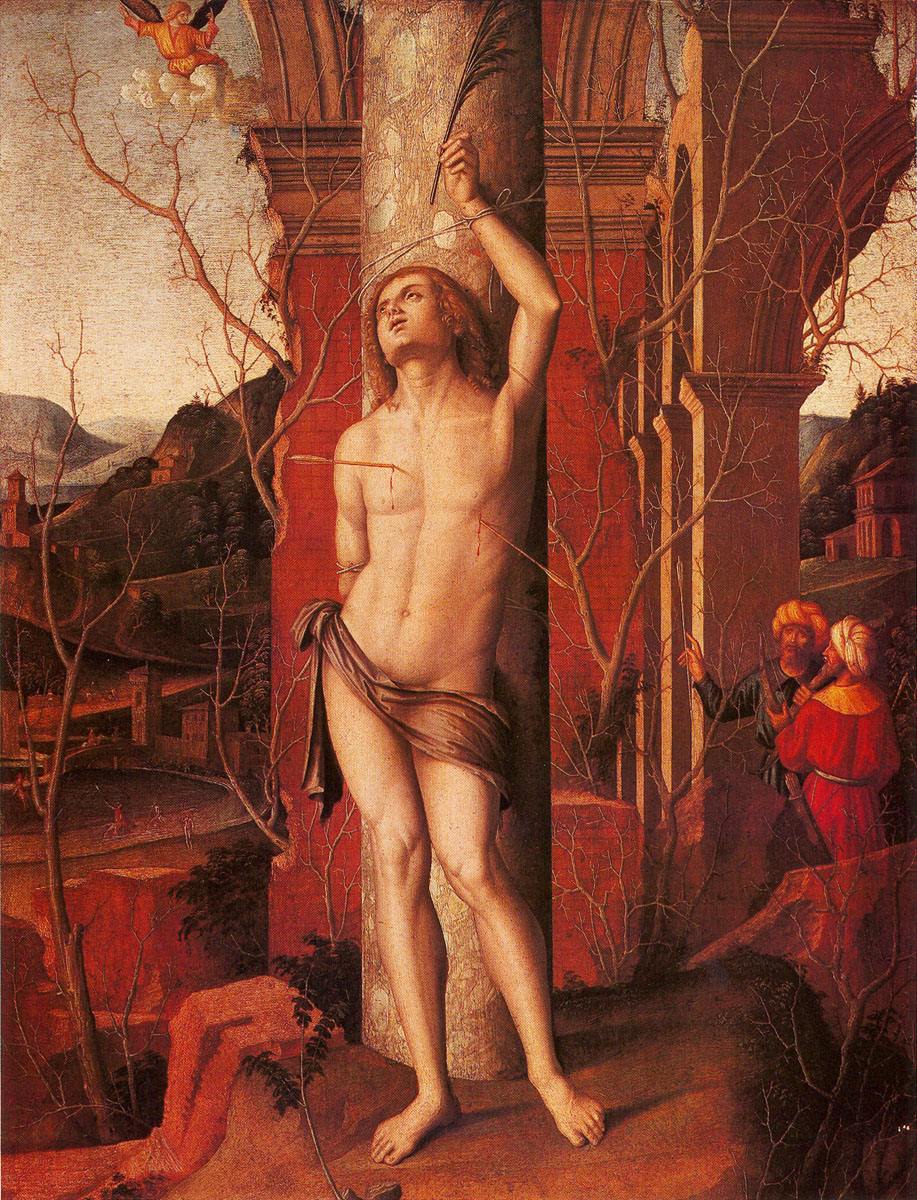
Saint Sebastian, (Museum of Fine Arts, Budapest)

Among his pupils in Forlì, are listed Baldassarre Carrari il Giovane.

== Work ==
Palmezzano's studio was prolific in producing altarpieces, most commonly featuring the iconic arrangement of an enthroned Virgin with child on her lap, while below, symmetrically sited in the foreground are flanking saints. Venetian painting, in general, and the work of Giovanni Bellini and Cima da Conegliano, in particular, were to remain the most powerful influences on Palmezzano's output. Moreover, he remained faithful to the Venetian style of the later 15th and early 16th century. Mannerism entirely passed him by, and he seemed immune to subsequent developments in Venetian painting. One of the most attractive facets of Palmezzano's oeuvre are the distinctive and suggestive landscapes that form the backdrops of many of his altarpieces. These are a blend of the ideal and lyrical, and of the observed reality of the Apennine foothills and mountains to the south of Forli for which Palmezzano clearly had a real affection. These landscapes are also employed to subtle and imaginative effect to convey the symbolic religious messages of the works.

== Chronology of work ==
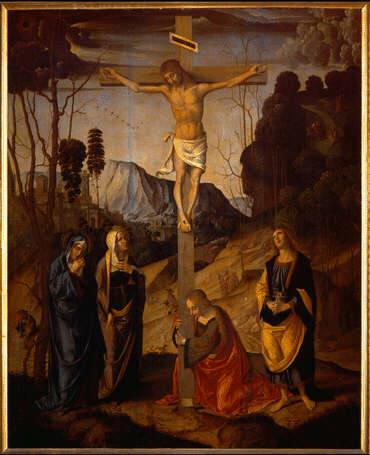
Crucifixion, (Uffizi, Florence)

- Crucifixion (early period) in the Pinacoteca Civica of Forlì.
- Virgin with Child between Saint John the Baptist and Saint Margaret (1492)
- Decorations in the Chapel Feo in Church of San Biagio at Forlì, destroyed in bombing during World War II (1493-34)
- Annunciation altarpiece for Forlì's Carmelite church (1495-57)
- Virgin and Child with Saints Giacomo and Michele (1490s)
- Madonna and Child with Saints (1493) Pinacoteca di Brera
- Virgin and Child with Saints John the Baptist and Filippo Bennizi - Gallery of Antique Art of Fondazione Cassa di Risparmio di Cesena
- Virgin and Child with Saint Francis of Assisi and Saint Catherine of Alexandria, created in Matelica (1501)
- Crucifixion between Gualberto and Mary Magdalene
- Holy Communion of Apostles (1506) - Oil on wood, Pinacoteca Civica, Forlì
- The Dead Christ in the Tomb with the Virgin Mary and Saints (1506) - Oil on wood, National Gallery, London
- Virgin and Child Enthroned between Saints John the Baptist and Jerome (1510) - Oil on wood panel, Vatican Picture Gallery
- Dead Christ with Two Angels (1510) - Tempera on panel, 81 x 79 cm, Musée du Louvre, Paris
- Holy Family with Saint Elizabeth and the Infant Saint John (1515) - Oil on wood panel, Vatican Picture Gallery
- Hospital Beaten for Forlì (1517)
- The Baptism of Christ (1535) - Oil on panel, 90 x 70 cm, Pinacoteca Civica, Forlì
- The Baptism of Christ (c. 1535) - Oil on wood panel, National Gallery of Victoria, Melbourne
- Virgin and Child Surrounded by Saints (1537) - Oil on wood panel, Vatican Picture Gallery
- Christ Bearing the Cross - Oil on wood panel, Vatican Picture Gallery
- Madonna and Child with the Infant Saint John the Baptist - Oil on panel, 65 x 52 cm, Private collection
- The Annunciation with City by the Sea - Oil on wood panel, Vatican Picture Gallery
- Saint Jerome and Saint Francis in the Desert, Loyola University Art Museum, Chicago

== Sources ==
- Francis Russell, Marco Palmezzano: Forlì, in The Burlington magazine, 148.2006, 1237, p. 294-295.
