= Melozzo da Forlì =

Italian architect and painter (c. 1438–1494)

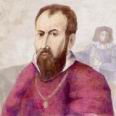
- Self-portrait
- Born: c. 1438; Forlì, Papal States
- Died: 8 November 1494 (aged c. 56); Forlì, Papal States
- Education: Forlì painting school
- Known for: Painting, architecture
- Notable work: Frescoes of the Basilica dei Santi Apostoli (Rome), Basilica della Santa Casa (Loreto)
- Movement: Italian Renaissance
- Patron(s): Ansuino da Forlì

Melozzo da Forlì (c. 1438 – 8 November 1494) was an Italian Renaissance painter and architect. His fresco paintings are notable for the use of foreshortening. He was the most important member of the Forlì painting school.

== Biography ==
Melozzo was supposedly from a wealthy family named Ambrosi from Forlì. Nothing is known about his early years. It is only a hypothesis that he was formed by the Forlivese school of art, then dominated by Ansuino da Forlì; both were influenced by Andrea Mantegna. It has been said, also without confirmation, that he became a journeyman and color-grinder to master painters. His presence was first mentioned in his birthplace in 1460 and again in 1464. Around this period, and together with Antoniazzo Romano, he painted frescoes in the Bessarione chapel in the Basilica dei Santi Apostoli in Rome. Melozzo then moved to Urbino, probably between 1465 and 1474. There he met Piero della Francesca, who profoundly influenced Melozzo's style and use of perspective. He would have also studied architecture by Bramante and the work of Flemish painters then working for duke Federico da Montefeltro. Melozzo may have worked with Justus of Ghent and Pedro Berruguete to decorate the studiolo of the city's famous Ducal Palace.

Around 1472-74, Melozzo transferred to Rome, although some authorities claim his presence in Rome five or ten years earlier for work in the Basilica di San Marco. In 1477, he finished his first major work in the new seat, a fresco now transferred to canvas and placed in the Pinacoteca Vaticana, representing Sixtus IV Appointing Platina as Librarian of the Vatican Library. In the same year Girolamo Riario built his palace in Rome, now known as Palazzo Altemps, with designs by Melozzo. In 1478, he was one of the original members of the Academy of St Luke, founded by Sixtus IV to unite the chief painters working in the city.

In about 1472-74, Melozzo was commissioned by Pietro Riario to paint the vault of the apse in the basilica dei Santi Apostoli in Rome, his subject being the Ascension of Christ. In this work, Christ is boldly and effectively foreshortened. This fresco was taken down in 1711. The figure of Christ is now in the Quirinal Palace; some of the other portions, which influenced Raphael, are in the sacristy of St Peter's. A hall in the Vatican Museums, with designs of angels and apostles by Melozzo, was taken from the same fresco. Another work of the Roman period is an Annunciation that can still be seen in the Pantheon.

Melozzo's last work in Rome was a chapel, now destroyed, in the church of Santa Maria in Trastevere. After the death of Sixtus IV in 1484, Melozzo moved from Rome to Loreto. There he painted the fresco in the cupola of the sacristy of San Marco in the Basilica della Santa Casa, commissioned by cardinal Girolamo Basso della Rovere. It is one of the first examples of a cupola decorated both with architecture and figures; it greatly influenced the Camera degli Sposi by Mantegna.

In 1489 Melozzo returned to Rome. During this period he probably drew some cartoons for the mosaics of Jesus blessing in the Chapel of St Helena of the basilica of Santa Croce in Gerusalemme.

Melozzo also painted the cupola of the Capuchin church at Forlì, which was destroyed in 1651. It has been said that he executed at Urbino some of the portraits of great men (Plato, Dante, Sixtus IV, et al) which are now divided between the Barberini Palace and the Campana collection in Paris. In 1493, he worked on some ceilings, now lost, of the Palazzo Comunale of Ancona. Eventually Melozzo returned to Forlì, where, together with his pupil Marco Palmezzano, he decorated the Feo Chapel in the church of San Biagio, which was destroyed during World War II. The Pinacoteca of Forlì houses a fresco by Melozzo, known as the "Pestapepe," or Pepper-grinder, now much damaged. Originally painted as a grocer's sign, it is an energetic example of rather coarse realism and is Melozzo's only secular subject.

Melozzo died in November 1494 in Forlì and is buried in the Church of the Santissima Trinita (Most Holy Trinity).

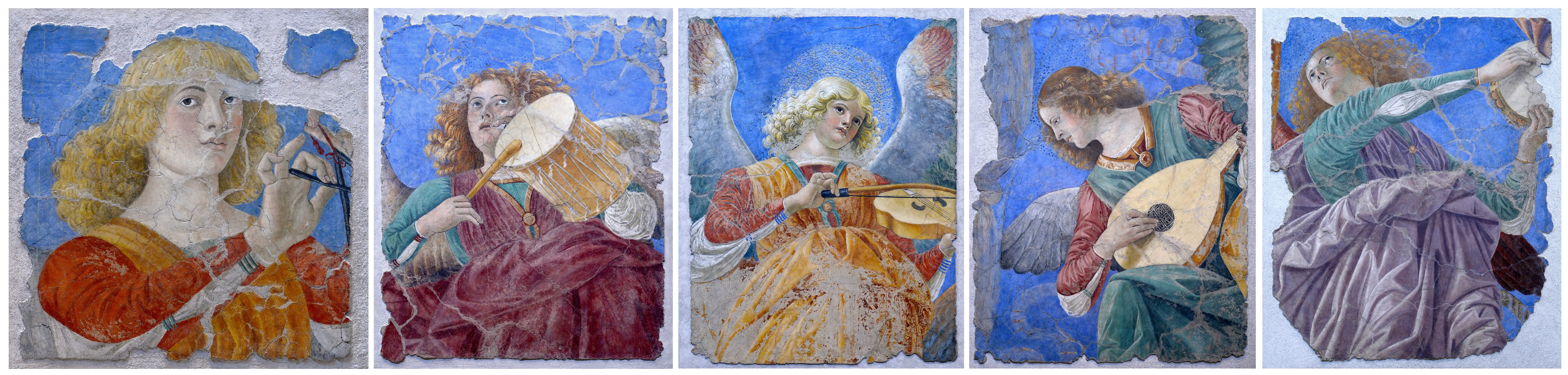
Selection of musician angels from fresco paintings of the Basilica dei Santi Apostoli, by Melozzo da Forli (Pinacoteca of the Vatican Museums)

== Legacy ==
While few of Melozzo's works are still preserved, critics agree that he contributed to the progress of pictorial art. Without being remarkable as a colorist, he painted with care and finish, creating fine and dignified figures. His use of perspective influenced other painters. Melozzo's works bear a certain resemblance to those of his contemporary Andrea Mantegna. Marco Palmezzano was a pupil of Melozzo. The signature "Marcus de Melotius" on some of Palmezzano's works, along with a general affinity of style, has led to their being ascribed to Melozzo and to the latter being incorrectly named "Marco Melozzo". The paintings of Melozzo strongly influenced Michelangelo, Raphael and Donato Bramante.

== Sources ==
- Herbermann, Charles, ed. (1913). "Melozzo da Forlí" . Catholic Encyclopedia. New York: Robert Appleton Company.
- Bryan, Michael (1886), Robert Edmund Graves (ed.), Dictionary of Painters and Engravers, Biographical and Critical, London: George Bell and Sons, p. 505
- Clark, Nicholas (1990), Melozzo Da Forli, London: Sotheby's Publications, ISBN 978-0-85667-371-9
