= List of works by Guido Cagnacci =

This incomplete list of works by Guido Cagnacci contains paintings and drawings in a variety of genres. Titles and dates often vary by source.

== List of works by year ==
Image	Title	Date	Dimensions	Collection	Medium
	The Virgin and Child with Saints Sebastian, Roch and Hyacinth	c. 1620–1625	320 × 190 cm	Oratory of San Rocco, Montegridolfo (Montegridolfo)	Altarpiece
	The Procession of the Holy Sacrament	1627–1628		Museum of Saludecio and Blessed Amato (Saludecio) (Note: On 8 September 1627, the Confraternity of the Holy Sacrament in Saludecio commissioned Cagnacci to decorate its chapel in the parish church of San Biagio. The painting was later moved out of the church and into the local museum.)	
	The Virgin and Child with Three Carmelite Saints: Teresa of Ávila, Mary Magdalene de' Pazzi, and Andrew Corsini	c. 1629–1631	335 × 230 cm	San Giovanni Battista, Rimini (Rimini)	Altarpiece
	Infant Jesus between Saints Joseph and Eligius	1634	241.7 × 156 cm	San Michele Arcangelo, Santarcangelo di Romagna (Santarcangelo di Romagna) (Note: In August 1634, the Compania of the Carpenters and Blacksmiths of Santarcangelo di Romagna commissioned Cagnacci to paint an altarpiece with their two patron saints, Joseph and Eligius, for their chapel in Sante Croce. The painting was later moved to San Michele Arcangelo, the church where Cagnacci was baptised.)	Altarpiece
	The Penitent Magdalene	1637		Santa Maria Maddalena, Urbania (Urbania)	Altarpiece
	Glory of Saint Valerian	1642–1644		Pinacoteca Civica di Forlì (Forlì) (Note: Between 1619 and 1636, a new chapel was built to house the Madonna of the Fire, the most sacred image in Forlì. The chapel was attached to the left nave of the cathedral of Santa Croce. In 1642, Cagnacci was commissioned for two quadroni ('large paintings') to decorate the dome of the chapel, representing the patron saints of the city: Valerian and Mercurialis. In 1699, they were removed and placed somewhere else in the cathedral. In 1851, they were moved to the Pinacoteca Civica di Forlì.)	
	Glory of Saint Mercurialis	1642–1643		Pinacoteca Civica di Forlì (Forlì)	
	Allegory of Human Life	c. 1640s	118.2 × 95.3 cm	Private collection	Oil on canvas
	Allegory of Human Life	c. 1650	115 × 94 cm	Cavallini-Sgarbi Collection (Portogruaro)	Oil on canvas
	David with the Head of Goliath	c. 1645–1650	108.3 × 86.4 cm	J. Paul Getty Museum (Los Angeles)	Oil on canvas
	David Holding Goliath's Head	c. 1650		Columbia Museum of Art (Columbia, SC)	Oil on canvas
	The Rape of Europa	c. 1650		Molinari-Pradelli Collection (Castenaso)	
	Jacob Peeling the Rods	c. 1650	148.8 × 186.5 cm	Picture Gallery, Buckingham Palace (Royal Collection)	Oil on canvas
	The Death of Cleopatra	c. 1645–1655	95 × 75 cm	Metropolitan Museum of Art (New York City)	Oil on canvas
	The Death of Cleopatra	c. 1660–1662	45 × 55 cm	Pinacoteca di Brera (Milan)	Oil on canvas
	The Death of Cleopatra	c. 1661–1662	120 × 158 cm	Kunsthistorisches Museum (Vienna)	Oil on canvas
	Emperor Leopold I in Coronation Armour	c. 1657–1658	190 × 120 cm	Kunsthistorisches Museum (Vienna)	Oil on canvas
	Saint Jerome	after 1659	160 × 110.5 cm	Kunsthistorisches Museum (Vienna)	Oil on canvas
	The Repentant Magdalene	c. 1660–1663	229.2 × 266.1 cm	Norton Simon Museum (Pasadena, CA)	Oil on canvas
	Head of a Woman in Left Profile, Looking Down	Undated	22 × 25.4 cm	Nationalmuseum (Sweden)	Black chalk, heightened with white chalk on dark grey washed paper

=== Disputed attributions ===
Image	Title	Date	Dimensions	Collection	Medium
	The Rape of Lucretia (now usually attributed to Felice Ficherelli)	c. late 1630s – c. 1640	163.5 x 117 cm	Accademia di San Luca (Rome)	Oil on canvas
