= Valerian of Forlì =

Unofficial saint and martyr of Forlì

Saint Valerian of Forlì
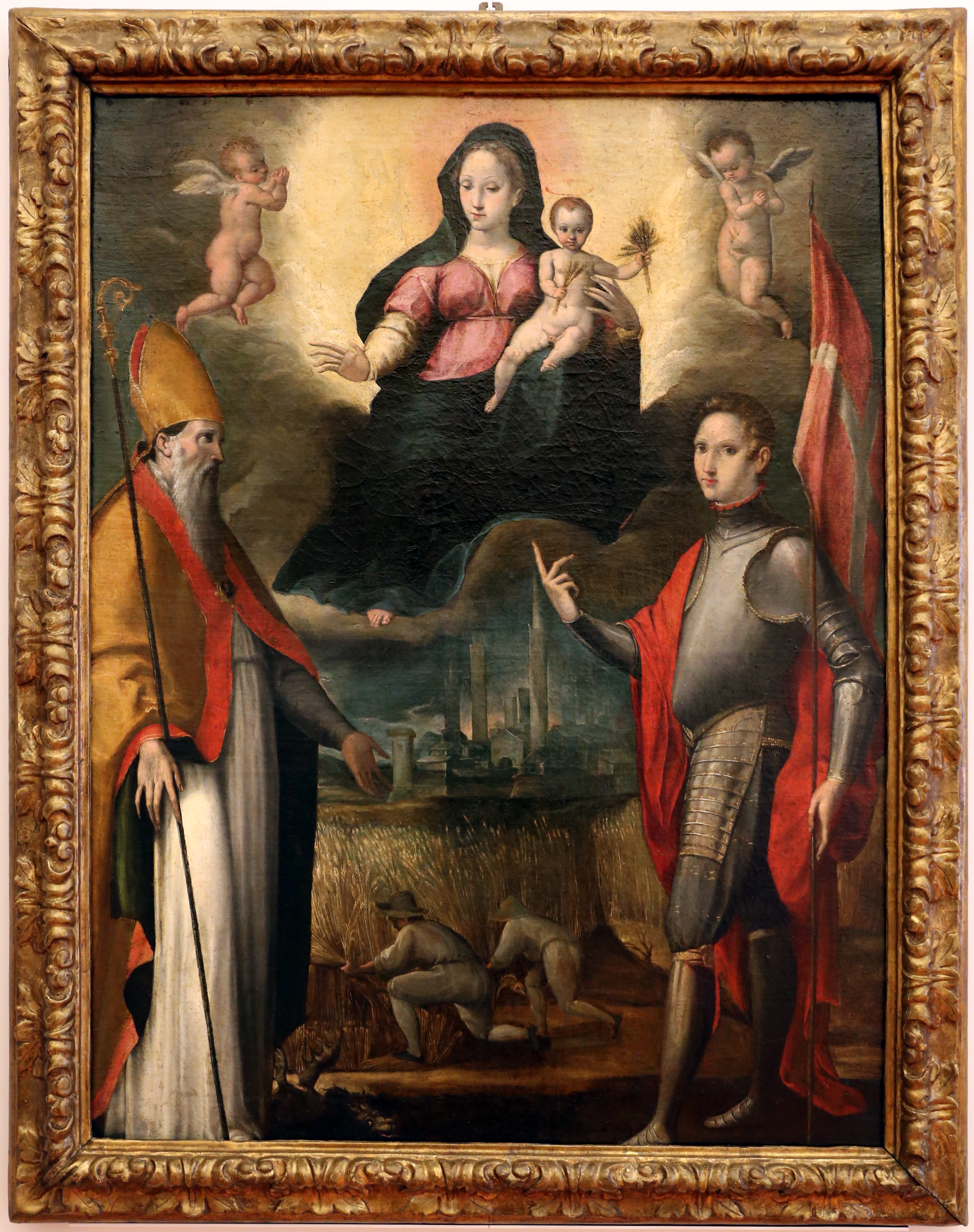
- Altarpiece by Gianfrancesco Modigliani in the Pinacoteca Civica di Forlì, with Saint Valerian on the right, 1590s

Martyr
- Residence: Forlì
- Major shrine: Santa Croce, Forlì
- Feast: 4 May

Valerian of Forlì (Italian: Valeriano da Forlì) was, according to mediaeval Christian traditions, a patron saint of the city of Forlì.

According to one tradition, Valerian was a soldier in Roman times who died a martyr in his city, probably in the locality of San Valeriano, known today as San Varano, together with eighty of his companions, the martyrs from Forlì. It was said that, despite being a soldier, Valerian refused to fight both in order not to endanger civilians and for refusing violence, and converted his fellow soldiers to Christianity.

Another tradition, in connexion with the church of Santa Maria del Voto, attributes to a certain romito (lit. 'hermit') and preacher of the Roman era, also named Valerian, the performance of miraculous deeds and successful exorcisms.

== Veneration ==
On 4 May 1848, in Santa Croce, the cathedral of Forlì, his bones were moved from the chapel of the Madonna del Fuoco to the main altar. In addition to various works of art, he is depicted on the ancient municipal seal and on that of the bishop of Forlì.

He is remembered locally on 22 November, but does not appear in the official Roman Martyrology. In 1967 the Sacred Congregation of Rites expunged his feast day (4 May) from the liturgical calendar, due to confusion as to the identity of the historical Valerian.

== See also ==
- Mercurialis of Forlì
