= The Conversion of Mary Magdalene =

Painting by Paolo Veronese

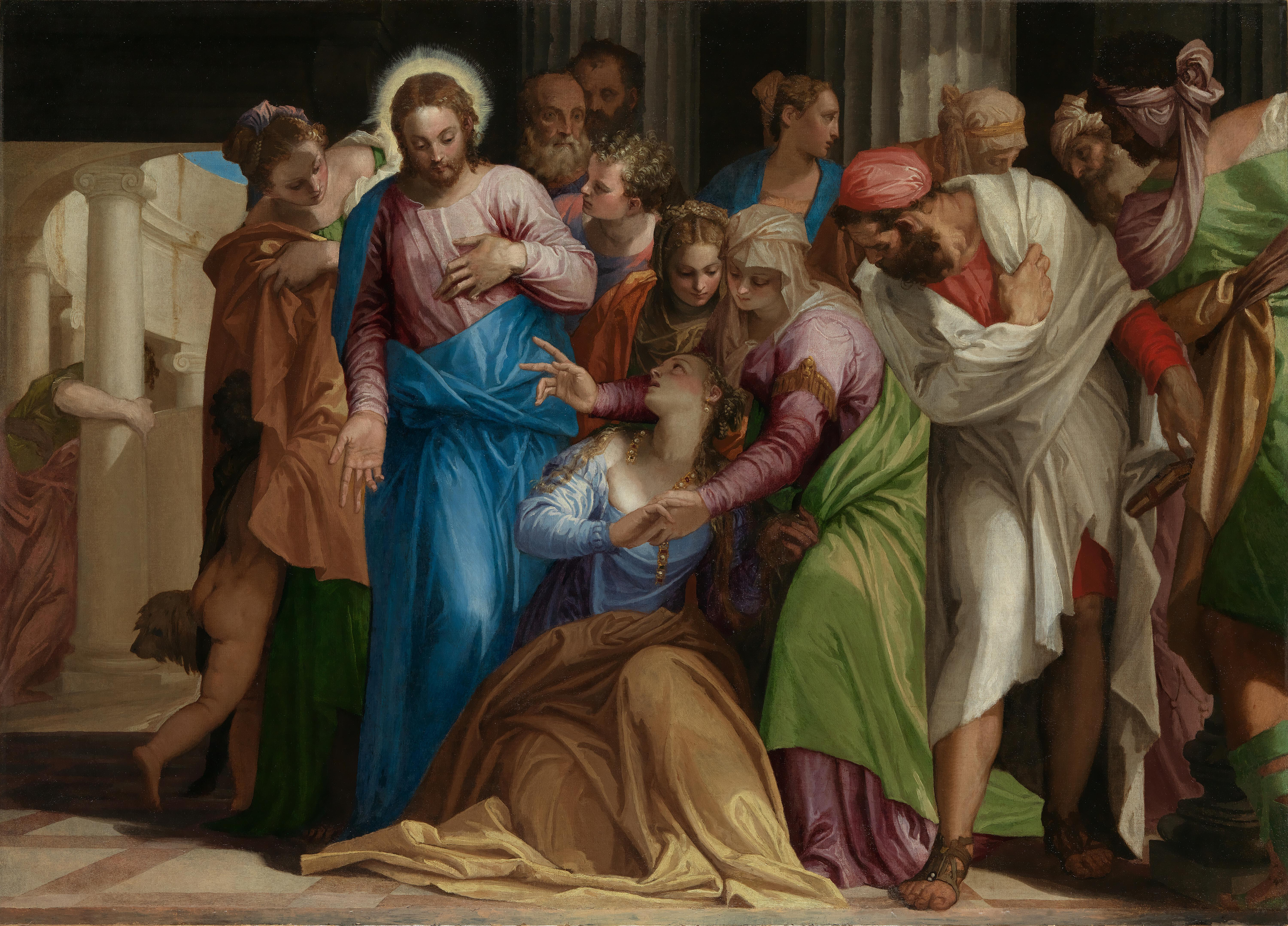
- Artist: Paolo Veronese
- Year: 1545–1548
- Medium: Oil on canvas
- Dimensions: 163.5 cm × 117.5 cm (64.4 in × 46.3 in)
- Location: National Gallery, London
- Owner: National Gallery, NG931

The Conversion of Mary Magdalene is an oil painting, an early work by the Italian Renaissance artist based in Venice, Paolo Veronese (1528–1588). He was known for his sumptuous paintings with a dramatic and colourful style. Dating from circa 1545–1548, when he was still in his teens, the painting was probably commissioned by a noble patron in Verona. It is now in the National Gallery in London.

The scene that the painting depicts is an event that is not described in the Gospels or the Golden Legend, and reflects the widespread beliefs at the time that, firstly, Mary Magdalene and Martha were sisters, living together, and secondly that Mary Magdalene was the woman mentioned elsewhere in the Gospels who had lived a life of sexual sin, perhaps a prostitute. Today these are seen by most Christians, including the Catholic Church, as three different women, with Mary of Bethany as Martha's sister.

== Subject ==
The subject of the painting has been debated: the general opinion is now that it depicts the conversion of Mary Magdalene, as described in Pietro Aretino's 1535 book L'umanità di Cristo; this version of the Gospels was widely distributed and read in Northern Italy at this time. In the legend that inspired the painting, Mary went to the temple in Jerusalem where the teachings of Jesus inspired her to convert to a pious life. In the painting she is depicted in dress inappropriate for the religious building, which Veronese used to symbolise her prior sinful life. She is shown on her knees and blushing as she listens to Jesus.

== Painting ==
In this painting, Martha and Mary Magdalene are in the Temple where Jesus is preaching. Mary Magdalene is on her knees beside Christ, turning her face towards him, while Martha is extending her hands towards Christ and Mary Magdalene. Her low-cut dress alludes to her former life of sin, and the necklace slipping from her neck echoes her turn away from a worldly life towards one of spiritual devotion.

The scene, set in the Temple, is very rare, but there is another depiction in the National Gallery, The Conversion of Mary Magdalene by Pedro Campaña, c. 1562, after a destroyed fresco by Federico Zuccaro in a church in Venice. There is also a study by Paul Delaroche (1797–1856) of about 1835 in the Wallace Collection, London. This was for a set of lunettes in the Church of the Madeleine, Paris which were not executed in the end. The Repentant Magdalene of the early 1660s by the Baroque Italian painter Guido Cagnacci shows a more common version of the subject, set at the home of the two sisters, with Christ not present.

Paolo Veronese was known for his depictions of luxurious settings and love of decorating the most holy and sacred of scenes with people clad in shimmering fur-lined gowns made of silks and brocades, more reminiscent of Venetian high society than humble representations of the subjects. When the Inquisition questioned his choice of representing holy subjects he answered: "We painters take liberties, the same way that poets and lunatics do", thus asserting that his liberty as an artist included being able to choose how to portray his subjects.

The painting has been in the National Gallery in London since 1876, when it was bequeathed from the estate of art collector Wynne Ellis.

== See also ==
- Allegory of Virtue and Vice (Veronese)
