= Ciccolini =

Ciccolini is a surname of Italian origin. Notable people with the surname include:

- Aldo Ciccolini (1925–2015), Italian pianist
- Claudio Ciccolini (1624–1688), Italian Roman Catholic prelate
- Félix Ciccolini (1916–2010), French politician
- François Ciccolini (born 1962), French football manager and player
