= Bernardo Cappello =

Venetian humanist and writer

Bernardo Cappello (1498 - 8 March 1565) was a Venetian humanist, writer and pupil of Pietro Bembo.

== Life ==
Cappello was born in Venice, the son of the diplomat Francesco Capello and his wife Elena Priuli. He held various political posts until being exiled to the island of Rab in 1540 for suggesting that the power of the Council of Ten should be limited. He escaped from Rab in 1541 and took refuge in Rome under the protection of cardinal Alessandro Farnese, whom he followed to Florence, France and Parma. He later became lieutenant of Tivoli before becoming governor of Orvieto, Todi, Assisi and Spoleto in rapid succession. He died in Rome.

== Works ==
- Rime, a collection of 314 sonnets and 34 canzoni, dedicated to (among others) Pope Paul III, Pope Pius IV, Francis I of France, Margaret of Valois, Caterina de Medici, Charles V, Philip II of Spain, Ippolito d'Este, Alessandro Farnese, Guidobaldo II della Rovere, Pietro Bembo, Annibal Caro, Vittoria Colonna, marchesa of Pescara and Pietro Giovanni Aliotti, bishop of Forlì.
