= Muzio Dandini =

Roman Catholic prelate

Most Reverend Muzio Dandini
- Bishop of Senigallia
- Church: Catholic Church
- Diocese: Diocese of Senigallia
- In office: 1686–1712
- Predecessor: Rainutius Baschi
- Successor: Giandomenico Paracciani

Orders
- Consecration: 15 April 1686 by Alessandro Crescenzi (cardinal)

Personal details
- Born: 8 November 1634 Cesene, Italy
- Died: 15 April 1686 (age 51) Senigallia, Italy

Muzio Dandini (8 November 1634 – 15 April 1712) was an Italian Roman Catholic prelate who served as Bishop of Senigallia (1686–1712).

== Biography ==
Muzio Dandini was born in Cesene, Italy. On 1 April 1686, he was appointed during the papacy of Pope Innocent XI as Bishop of Senigallia. On 15 April 1686, he was consecrated bishop by Alessandro Crescenzi (cardinal), Cardinal-Priest of Santa Prisca, with Francesco Casati, Titular Archbishop of Trapezus, and Marcantonio Barbarigo, Archbishop of Corfù, serving as co-consecrators. He served as Bishop of Senigallia until his death on 7 August 1712.

== Episcopal succession ==
While bishop, he was the principal co-consecrator of:

- Giovanni Rasponi, Bishop of Forlì (1689);
- Jan Gomoliński, Bishop of Kyiv and Chernihiv (1700); and
- Alessandro Roncovieri, Bishop of Borgo San Donnino (1700).

Catholic Church titles
Preceded by Rainutius Baschi	Bishop of Senigallia; 1686–1712	Succeeded by Giandomenico Paracciani
