= Bartolomeo Gandolfi =

Italian Roman Catholic prelate

Most Reverend Bartolomeo Gandolfi
- Bishop of Faenza
- Church: Catholic Church
- Diocese: Diocese of Faenza
- In office: 1463–1471

Orders
- Consecration: 27 November 1463 by Giacomo Paladini

Personal details
- Died: 4 July 1471 Faenza, Italy

Bartolomeo Gandolfi (died 1471) was an Italian Roman Catholic prelate who served as Bishop of Faenza (1463–1471).

== Biography ==
Already by 1437, Bartolomeo di Francisci Gandolfi was a Canon of the Cathedral Chapter and iudex capituli. By June 1463, he is recorded as Archpriest of the plebs of Corleto.

Bishop Alessandro Stampetti da Sarnano of Faenza died in February 1463. The Cathedral Chapter duly met and, on 20 February, elected Federico Manfredi, a Canon of the cathedral and the son of Astorgio II, Lord of Faenza. Pope Pius II, however, refused to ratify the election of a young man who was only twenty-two years old, and quashed the election. On 10 April 1463, Bartolomeo Gandolfi was appointed by Pope Pius II as Bishop of Faenza, at the suggestion of Astorgio II.

On 27 November 1463, he was consecrated bishop by Giacomo Paladini, Bishop of Forlì.

He died in 1470, between 19 July and 21 December. His successor, Federico Manfredi, was still only a Protonotary Apostolic in a document of 19 July 1470, but already Bishop of Faenza, according to a document dated 21 December 1470.

== Sources ==
- Azzurrini, Bernardino (1905). Antonio Messeri (ed.). Chronica breviora aliaque monumenta Faventina a Bernardino Azzurrinio collecta. Rerum Italicarum Scriptores, XXVIII, parte iii (in Latin and Italian). Tipi della casa editrice S. Lapi.
- Strocchi, Andrea (1841). Serie cronologica storico-critica de' vescovi faentini (in Italian). Faenza: Montanari e Marabini. pp. 184–186. [highly inaccurate]

Catholic Church titles
Preceded by Alessandro Stampetti	Bishop of Faenza; 1463–1471	Succeeded by Federico de Manfredi
