= Ascenzio Guerrieri =

Most Reverend Ascenzio Guerrieri
- Bishop of Castellaneta
- Church: Catholic Church
- Diocese: Diocese of Castellaneta
- In office: 1635–1645
- Predecessor: Antonio de Mattei
- Successor: Angelo Melchiori

Orders
- Consecration: 13 May 1635 by Francesco Maria Brancaccio

Personal details
- Died: 1645 Castellaneta, Italy

Ascenzio Guerrieri (died 1645) was a Roman Catholic prelate who served as Bishop of Castellaneta (1635–1645).

== Biography ==
On 7 May 1635, Ascenzio Guerrieri was appointed during the papacy of Pope Urban VIII as Bishop of Castellaneta. On 13 May 1635, he was consecrated bishop by Francesco Maria Brancaccio, Cardinal-Priest of Santi XII Apostoli, with Giacomo Theodoli, Bishop of Forlì and Alessandro Suardi, Bishop of Lucera, serving as co-consecrators. He served as Bishop of Castellaneta until his death in 1645.

Catholic Church titles
| Preceded by Antonio de Mattei | Bishop of Castellaneta; 1635–1645 | Succeeded by Angelo Melchiori |
