= Mercurialis =

Mercurialis or variants may refer to:

- Mercurialis (plant), a genus of plants in the family Euphorbiaceae
- Girolamo Mercuriale or Mercuriali (1530–1606), Italian philologist and physician
- Mercurialis of Forlì (Italian: Mercuriale) (died c. 406), bishop of Forlì

== See also ==
- Mercurial
