= Giacomo Paladini =

15th-century Roman Catholic bishop

Most Reverend Giacomo Paladini
- Bishop of Forlì
- Church: Catholic Church
- Diocese: Diocese of Forlì
- In office: 1463–1470
- Predecessor: Daniele di Arluno
- Successor: Alessandro Numai

Orders
- Consecration: 27 November 1463 by Ventura degli Abbati

Giacomo Paladini (died 1470) was an Italian Roman Catholic prelate who served as Bishop of Forlì (1463–1470).

== Biography ==
On 18 September 1463, Giacomo Paladini was appointed during the papacy of Pope Pius II as Bishop of Forlì. On 27 November 1463, he was consecrated bishop by Ventura degli Abbati, Bishop of Bertinoro, with Antonio Malatesta, Bishop of Cesena, and Bartolomeo Gandolfi, Bishop of Faenza, serving as co-consecrators. He served as Bishop of Forlì until his death in 1470.

Catholic Church titles
Preceded by Daniele di Arluno	Bishop of Forlì; 1463–1470	Succeeded by Alessandro Numai
