= Giovanni Rasponi =

18th-century Roman Catholic bishop

Most Reverend Giovanni Rasponi
- Bishop of Forlì
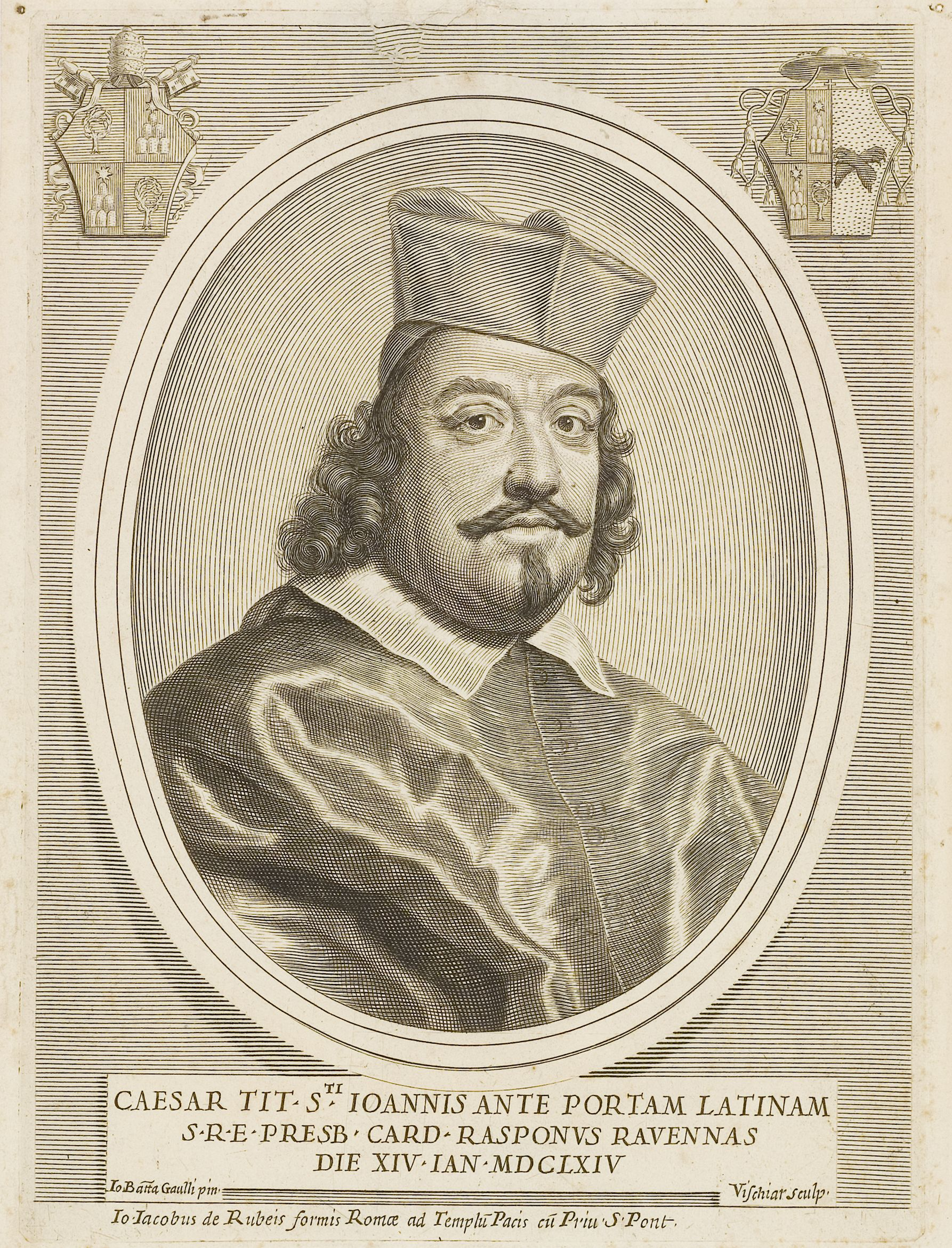
- Church: Catholic Church
- Diocese: Diocese of Forlì
- In office: 1689–1714
- Predecessor: Claudio Ciccolini
- Successor: Tommaso Torelli

Orders
- Ordination: 27 February 1689
- Consecration: 20 March 1689 by Flavio Chigi (seniore)

Personal details
- Born: 1646 Ravenna, Italy
- Died: 31 August 1714 (age 68)

Giovanni Rasponi (1646 – 31 August 1714) was an Italian Roman Catholic prelate who served as Bishop of Forlì from 1689 to 1714.

== Biography ==
Giovanni Rasponi was born in Ravenna, Italy and ordained a priest on 27 February 1689. On 28 February 1689, he was appointed during the papacy of Pope Innocent XI as Bishop of Forlì. On 20 March 1689, he was consecrated bishop by Flavio Chigi (seniore), Cardinal-Bishop of Albano, with Muzio Dandini, Bishop of Senigallia, and Stefano Giuseppe Menatti, Titular Bishop of Cyrene, serving as co-consecrators. He served as Bishop of Forlì until his death on 31 August 1714.

While bishop, he was the principal co-consecrator of Andrea Santacroce, Titular Archbishop of Seleucia in Isauria (1690).

Catholic Church titles
Preceded by Claudio Ciccolini	Bishop of Forlì; 1689–1714	Succeeded by Tommaso Torelli
