= Lorenzo Campeggi (bishop of Senigallia) =

Italian Roman Catholic bishop

Most Reverend Lorenzo Campeggi
- Bishop of Senigallia
- Church: Catholic Church
- Diocese: Diocese of Senigallia
- In office: 1628–1639
- Predecessor: Antonio Marcello Barberini
- Successor: Cesare Facchinetti
- Previous posts: Bishop of Cesena (1623–1628); Apostolic Nuncio to Savoy (1624–1627); Apostolic Nuncio to Spain (1634–1639)

Orders
- Consecration: 21 January 1624 by Ottavio Bandini

Personal details
- Died: 9 August 1639

Lorenzo Campeggi (died 1639) was a Roman Catholic prelate who served as Bishop of Senigallia (1628–1639), Apostolic Nuncio to Spain (1634–1639), Apostolic Nuncio to Savoy (1624–1627), and Bishop of Cesena (1623–1628).

== Biography ==
On 8 December 1623, Lorenzo Campeggi was appointed during the papacy of Pope Urban VIII as Bishop of Cesena. On 21 January 1624, he was consecrated bishop by Ottavio Bandini, Cardinal-Bishop of Palestrina, with Pietro Dini, Archbishop of Fermo, and Antonio Díaz (bishop), Bishop of Caserta, serving as co-consecrators. On 23 March 1624, he was appointed during the papacy of Pope Urban VIII as Apostolic Nuncio to Savoy where he served until his resignation on 3 July 1627. On 11 December 1628, he was appointed during the papacy of Pope Urban VIII as Bishop of Senigallia. On 31 January 1634, he was appointed during the papacy of Pope Urban VIII as Apostolic Nuncio to Spain; he served until his resignation on 8 August 1639. He served as Bishop of Senigallia until his death on 9 August 1639.

== External links and additional sources ==
- Cheney, David M. "Diocese of Cesena-Sarsina". Catholic-Hierarchy.org. (for Chronology of Bishops) ^{[self-published]}
- Chow, Gabriel. "Diocese of Cesena-Sarsina (Italy)". GCatholic.org. (for Chronology of Bishops) ^{[self-published]}
- Cheney, David M. "Nunciature to Savoy". Catholic-Hierarchy.org. (for Chronology of Bishops) ^{[self-published]}
- Cheney, David M. "Nunciature to Spain". Catholic-Hierarchy.org. ^{[self-published]}
- Chow, Gabriel. "Apostolic Nunciature Spain". GCatholic.org. ^{[self-published]}
- Cheney, David M. "Diocese of Senigallia". Catholic-Hierarchy.org. (for Chronology of Bishops) ^{[self-published]}
- Chow, Gabriel. "Diocese of Senigallia (Italy)". GCatholic.org. (for Chronology of Bishops) ^{[self-published]}

Catholic Church titles
Preceded by Francesco Sacrati (cardinal)	Bishop of Cesena; 1623–1628	Succeeded by Pietro Bonaventura
Preceded by Ladislao d'Aquino	Apostolic Nuncio to Savoy; 1624–1627	Succeeded by Aloysius Galli
Preceded by Cesare Monti	Apostolic Nuncio to Spain; 1634–1639	Succeeded by Cesare Facchinetti
Preceded by Antonio Marcello Barberini	Bishop of Senigallia; 1628–1639	Succeeded by Cesare Facchinetti
