= Tommaso Asti =

15th-century Roman Catholic bishop

Most Reverend Tommaso Asti
- Bishop of Forlì
- Church: Catholic Church
- Diocese: Diocese of Forlì
- In office: 1485–1512
- Predecessor: Alessandro Numai
- Successor: Pietro Griffo

Personal details
- Died: 1512

Tommaso Asti (died 1512) was an Italian Roman Catholic prelate who served as Bishop of Forlì (1485–1512).

On 3 September 1485, Tommaso Asti was appointed Bishop of Forlì by Pope Innocent VIII.

He served as Bishop of Forlì until his death in 1512.

Catholic Church titles
Preceded by Alessandro Numai	Bishop of Forlì; 1485–1512	Succeeded by Pietro Griffo
