= Alessandro Numai =

15th-century Roman Catholic bishop

Most Reverend Alessandro Numai
- Bishop of Forlì
- Church: Catholic Church
- Diocese: Diocese of Forlì
- In office: 1470–1485
- Predecessor: Giacomo Paladini
- Successor: Tommaso Asti

Personal details
- Born: 1440 Forlì, Italy
- Died: August 1485 (aged 44–45)

Alessandro Numai (1440 – August 1485) was an Italian Roman Catholic prelate who served as Bishop of Forlì (1470–1485).

== Biography ==
Alessandro Numai was born in 1440 in Forlì, Italy. On 9 May 1470, he was appointed Bishop of Forlì by Pope Paul II.

He served as Bishop of Forlì until his death in Aug 1485.

Catholic Church titles
Preceded by Giacomo Paladini	Bishop of Forlì; 1470–1485	Succeeded by Tommaso Asti
