= Pietro Griffo =

16th-century Roman Catholic bishop

Most Reverend Pietro Griffo
- Bishop of Forlì
- Church: Catholic Church
- Diocese: Diocese of Forlì
- In office: 1512–1516
- Predecessor: Tommaso Asti
- Successor: Bernardo de' Medici

Personal details
- Born: Jan 1469 Pisa
- Died: 1516 Rome

Pietro Griffo (Latin: Petrus Griffus) (died 1516) was an Italian Roman Catholic prelate who served as Bishop of Forlì (1512–1516).

== Biography ==
On 31 Oct 1512, Pietro Griffo was appointed by Pope Julius II as Bishop of Forlì. He served as Bishop of Forlì until his death in 1516.

Catholic Church titles
Preceded by Tommaso Asti	Bishop of Forlì; 1512–1516	Succeeded by Bernardo de' Medici
