= Cesare Bartorelli =

17th-century Roman Catholic bishop

Most Reverend Cesare Bartorelli
- Bishop of Forli
- Church: Catholic Church
- In office: 1602–1635
- Predecessor: Corrado Tartarini
- Successor: Giacomo Theodoli

Personal details
- Died: 9 January 1635

Cesare Bartorelli (died 1635) was an Italian Roman Catholic prelate who served as Bishop of Forlì (1602–1635).

== Biography ==
On 20 Nov 1602, Cesare Bartorelli was appointed during the papacy of Pope Clement VIII as Bishop of Forlì. He served as Bishop of Forlì until his death on 9 Jan 1635.

While bishop, he was the principal co-consecrator of Gilles de Souvre, Bishop of Comminges (1617).

Catholic Church titles
Preceded by Corrado Tartarini	Bishop of Forlì; 1602–1635	Succeeded by Giacomo Theodoli
