= Bernardo de' Medici =

16th-century Roman Catholic bishop

Most Reverend Bernardo de' Medici
- Bishop of Forli
- Church: Catholic Church
- Diocese: Diocese of Forlì
- In office: 1516–1519
- Predecessor: Pietro Griffo
- Successor: Leonardo de' Medici

Personal details
- Died: 1519

Bernardo de' Medici (died 1519) was an Italian Roman Catholic prelate who served as Bishop of Forlì (1516–1519).

== Biography ==
On 15 Nov 1516, Bernardo de' Medici was appointed during the papacy of Pope Julius II as Bishop of Forlì. He served as Bishop of Forlì until his death in 1519.

Catholic Church titles
Preceded by Pietro Griffo	Bishop of Forlì; 1516–1519	Succeeded by Leonardo de' Medici
