= Corrado Tartarini =

16th-century Roman Catholic bishop

Most Reverend Corrado Tartarini
- Bishop of Forli; Apostolic Nuncio to Savoy
- Church: Catholic Church
- Diocese: Diocese of Forlì
- In office: 1599–1602
- Predecessor: Alessandro de Franceschi
- Successor: Cesare Bartorelli

Personal details
- Born: Città di Castello, Italy
- Died: 13 February 1602

Corrado Tartarini (died 1602) was an Italian Roman Catholic prelate who served as Bishop of Forlì (1599–1602) and Apostolic Nuncio to Savoy (1601–1602).

== Biography ==
Corrado Tartarini was born in Città di Castello, Italy. On 18 Sep 1599, he was appointed during the papacy of Pope Clement VIII as Bishop of Forlì. On 2 Aug 1601, he was appointed during the papacy of Pope Clement VIII as Apostolic Nuncio to Savoy. He served as Bishop of Forlì and Apostolic Nuncio to Savoy until his death on 13 Feb 1602.

Catholic Church titles
Preceded by Alessandro de Franceschi	Bishop of Forlì; 1599–1602	Succeeded by Cesare Bartorelli
Preceded by Giulio Cesare Riccardi	Apostolic Nuncio to Savoy; 1601–1602	Succeeded by Paolo Tolosa
