= Alexander Sforza =

Roman Catholic prelate

Most Reverend Alexander Sforza
- Titular Archbishop of Neocaesarea in Ponto; Apostolic Nuncio to Savoy
- Church: Catholic Church
- In office: 1695–1701
- Successor: Pompeio Aldrovandi

Orders
- Consecration: 19 June 1695 by Galeazzo Marescotti

Personal details
- Born: 6 August 1658 Viterbo, Italy
- Died: 8 Apr 1701 (age 42)

Alexander Sforza or Alessandro Sforza (1658–1701) was a Roman Catholic prelate who served as Titular Archbishop of Neocaesarea in Ponto (1695–1701) and Apostolic Nuncio to Savoy (1695–1701).

== Biography ==
Alexander Sforza was born in Viterbo, Italy on 6 August 1658. On 13 June 1695, he was appointed during the papacy of Pope Innocent XII as Titular Archbishop of Neocaesarea in Ponto. On 19 June 1695, he was consecrated bishop by Galeazzo Marescotti, Cardinal-Priest of Santi Quirico e Giulitta, with Prospero Bottini, Titular Archbishop of Myra, and Sperello Sperelli, Bishop of Terni, serving as co-consecrators. On 24 Jun 1695, he was named Apostolic Nuncio to Savoy. He served as Apostolic Nuncio to Savoy until his death on 8 Apr 1701.

While bishop, he was the principal consecrator of Michel-Gabriel Rossillon de Bernex, Bishop of Genève (1697).

== External links and additional sources ==
- Cheney, David M. "Nunciature to Savoy". Catholic-Hierarchy.org. (for Chronology of Bishops) ^{[self-published]}

Catholic Church titles
Preceded by	Titular Archbishop of Neocaesarea in Ponto; 1695–1701	Succeeded by Pompeio Aldrovandi
Preceded by Ferdinando Strozza	Apostolic Nuncio to Savoy; 1695–1701	Succeeded by Alessandro Francesco Codebò
