= Bernardo Antonio de' Medici =

16th-century Roman Catholic bishop

Most Reverend Bernardo Antonio de' Medici
- Bishop of Cassano all'Jonio
- Church: Catholic Church
- Diocese: Diocese of Cassano all'Jonio
- In office: 1551–1552
- Predecessor: Durante Duranti
- Successor: Giovanni Angelo de' Medici
- Previous post: Bishop of Forlì (1528–1551)

Personal details
- Born: 1501
- Died: 1552 (age 51)

Bernardo Antonio de' Medici (1476 – 1552) was an Italian bishop and diplomat. He was considered one of the leading ambassadors of Cosimo I de' Medici.

He was the son of Antonio de' Medici and Selvaggia di Felice del Beccuto. He was bishop of Forlì between 1528 and 1551, before being transferred to the diocese of Cassano on 23 October 1551.

In 1537 Cosimo I gave him the delicate mission of getting confirmation of his right to the duchy (which had passed to him after Alessandro de' Medici's death) from Charles V, Holy Roman Emperor. He was invited to France and Genoa the same year and in 1539 he became ambassador to Naples. In 1540 he was one of the founders of the Accademia Fiorentina. He was invited back to France in 1544-45 by Francis I and in 1547-51 by Charles V. He was sent back to Tuscany by Charles in 1552 and died later that year.

Catholic Church titles
Preceded by Niccolò Ridolfi	Bishop of Forlì; 1528–1551	Succeeded by Pietro Giovanni Aliotti
Preceded by Durante Duranti	Bishop of Cassano all'Jonio; 1551–1552	Succeeded by Giovanni Angelo de' Medici
