= Luigi Galli =

17th-century Roman Catholic bishop

Most Reverend Luigi Galli
- Bishop of Ancona e Numana
- Church: Catholic Church
- Diocese: Diocese of Ancona e Numana
- In office: 1622–1657
- Predecessor: Giulio Savelli
- Successor: Giannicolò Conti
- Previous post: Apostolic Nuncio to Savoy (1627–1629)

Orders
- Consecration: 16 May 1622 by Giulio Savelli

Personal details
- Born: Osimo, Italy
- Died: 22 July 1657

Luigi Galli or Giovanni Galli (Latin: Ioannes Aloysius Galli) (died 1657) was a Roman Catholic prelate who served as Bishop of Ancona e Numana (1622–1657) and Apostolic Nuncio to Savoy (1627–1629).

== Biography ==
Galli was born in Osimo, Italy. On 2 May 1622, he was appointed during the papacy of Pope Gregory XV as Bishop of Ancona e Numana. On 16 May 1622, he was consecrated bishop by Giulio Savelli, Cardinal-Priest of Santa Sabina, with Marinus Bizzius, Archbishop of Bar, and Giulio Sansedoni, Bishop Emeritus of Grosseto, serving as co-consecrators. On 3 Jul 1627, he was appointed during the papacy of Pope Urban VIII as Apostolic Nuncio to Savoy where he served until his resignation on 11 Oct 1629. He served as Bishop of Ancona e Numana until his death on 22 Jul 1657.

While bishop, he was the principal co-consecrator of Ercole Rangoni, Bishop of Sant'Angelo dei Lombardi e Bisaccia (1622); and Andrea Baroni Peretti, Bishop of Palestrina (1624).

== External links and additional sources ==
- Cheney, David M. "Nunciature to Savoy". Catholic-Hierarchy.org. (for Chronology of Bishops) ^{[self-published]}
- Cheney, David M. "Archdiocese of Ancona-Osimo". Catholic-Hierarchy.org. (for Chronology of Bishops) ^{[self-published]}
- Chow, Gabriel. "Metropolitan Archdiocese of Ancona–Osimo (Italy)". GCatholic.org. (for Chronology of Bishops) ^{[self-published]}

Catholic Church titles
Preceded by Giulio Savelli	Bishop of Ancona e Numana; 1622–1657	Succeeded by Giannicolò Conti
Preceded by Lorenzo Campeggi	Apostolic Nuncio to Savoy; 1627–1629	Succeeded by Alessandro Castracani
