= Claudio Ciccolini =

17th-century Roman Catholic bishop

Most Reverend Claudio Ciccolini
- Church: Catholic Church
- Diocese: Diocese of Forlì
- In office: 1666–1688
- Predecessor: Giacomo Theodoli
- Successor: Giovanni Rasponi

Orders
- Consecration: 13 Jun 1666 by Carlo Bonelli

Personal details
- Born: Oct 1624 Macerata, Italy
- Died: 29 April 1688 (aged 63) Forlì, Italy

Claudio Ciccolini (October 1624 – 29 April 1688) was a Roman Catholic prelate who served as Bishop of Forlì from 1666 to 1688.

== Biography ==
Claudio Ciccolini was born in Oct 1624 in Macerata, Italy. On 7 June 1666, he was appointed during the papacy of Pope Urban VIII as Bishop of Forlì. On 13 June 1666, he was consecrated bishop by Carlo Bonelli, Cardinal-Priest of Sant'Anastasia. He served as Bishop of Forlì until his death on 29 April 1688.

== External links and additional sources ==
- Cheney, David M. "Diocese of Forlì–Bertinoro". Catholic-Hierarchy.org. (for Chronology of Bishops) ^{[self-published]}
- Chow, Gabriel. "Diocese of Forlì–Bertinoro (Italy)". GCatholic.org. (for Chronology of Bishops) ^{[self-published]}

Catholic Church titles
Preceded by Giacomo Theodoli	Bishop of Forlì; 1666–1688	Succeeded by Giovanni Rasponi
