= Domenico Svampa =

Italian Roman Catholic prelate and cardinal

His Eminence Domenico Svampa
- Archbishop of Bologna
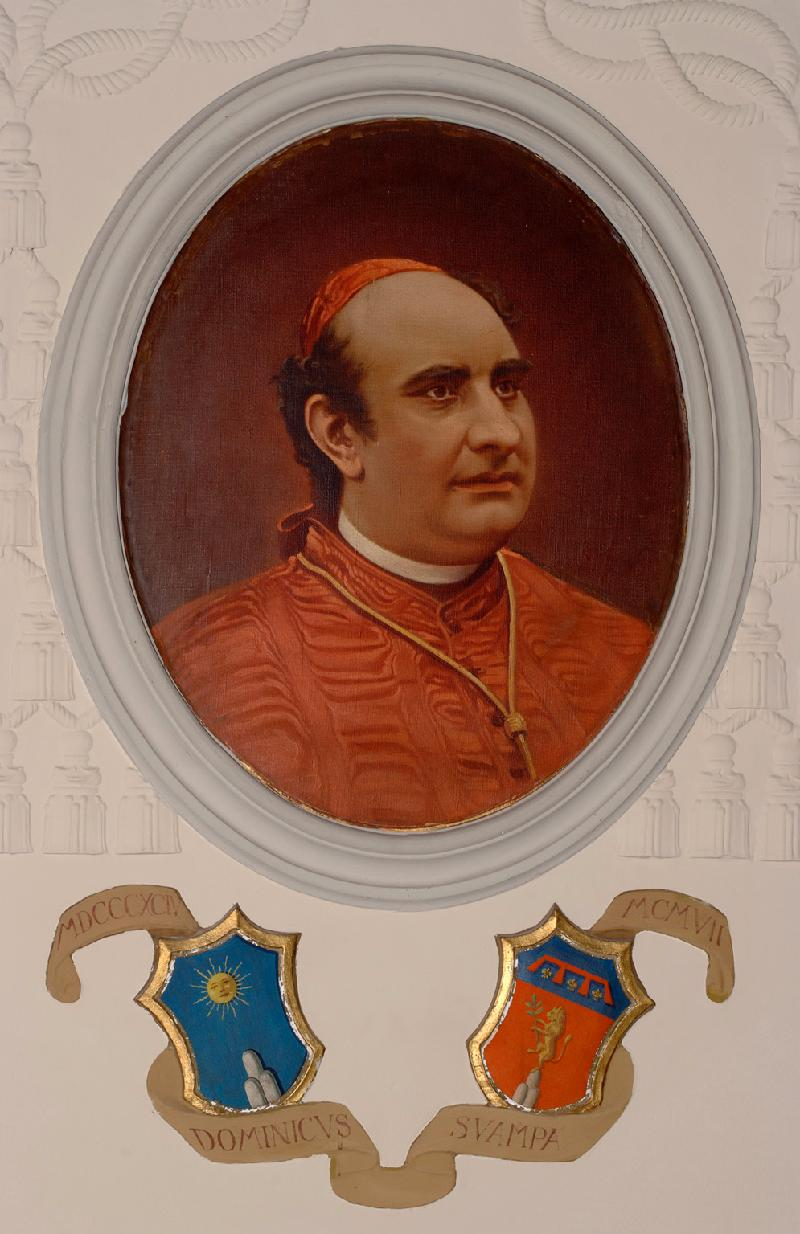
- Church: Roman Catholic Church
- Archdiocese: Bologna
- See: Bologna
- Appointed: 21 May 1894
- Term ended: 10 August 1907
- Predecessor: Serafino Vannutelli
- Successor: Giacomo della Chiesa
- Other post: Cardinal-Priest of Sant'Onofrio (1894-1907)
- Previous post: Bishop of Forlì (1887-94)

Orders
- Ordination: 4 April 1874 by Costantino Patrizi Naro
- Consecration: 29 June 1887 by Giovanni Simeoni
- Created cardinal: 18 May 1894 by Pope Leo XIII
- Rank: Cardinal-Priest

Personal details
- Born: Domenico Svampa; 13 June 1851 Montegranaro, Papal States
- Died: 10 August 1907 (aged 56) Bologna, Kingdom of Italy
- Coat of arms

Domenico Svampa (13 June 1851 in Montegranaro, Papal States – 10 August 1907 in Bologna, Kingdom of Italy) was an Italian Roman Catholic prelate and cardinal who served as the Archbishop of Bologna from 1894 until his death.

He studied in Rome in 1879 and obtained doctorates in theology as well as canon and civil law. He taught these subjects at the seminary of Fermo and the Pontifical Roman Atheaneum S Apollinare. He was elected bishop of Forlì on 23 May 1887 and was created cardinal priest in the consistory of 18 May 1894. He was named as Cardinal Priest of S Onofrio.

He participated in the conclave of 1903.

He is buried in Bologna.
