= Leonardo de' Medici =

Most Reverend Leonardo de' Medici
- Bishop of Forlì
- Church: Catholic Church
- Diocese: Diocese of Forlì
- In office: 1519–1526
- Predecessor: Bernardo de' Medici
- Successor: Niccolò Ridolfi

Leonardo de' Medici was a Roman Catholic prelate who served as Bishop of Forlì (1519–1526).

== Biography ==
On 14 Mar 1519, Leonardo de' Medici was appointed during the papacy of Pope Leo X as Bishop of Forlì. He served as Bishop of Forlì until his resignation in 1526.

Catholic Church titles
Preceded by Bernardo de' Medici	Bishop of Forlì; 1519–1526	Succeeded by Niccolò Ridolfi
