= Pietro Giovanni Aliotti =

Italian bishop

Pietro Giovanni Aliotti (also known as Pier Giovanni Aliotti or Aleotti; 1479 – 20 September 1563) was an Italian Roman Catholic prelate who served as the Bishop of Forlì from 1551 until his death.

== Life ==
In 1532 he became Guardarobiere Pontificio and Maestro di Camera, initially for pope Clement VII and then for pope Julius III, before being made bishop of Forlì in 1551, a post he held until his death. He was a confidant of several popes and given several other positions by them. He also took part in the final documents produced by the Council of Trent and was one of the dedicatees of Bernardo Cappello's Rime.

Vasari reports that Michelangelo disliked him and nicknamed him 'Tantecose', since "he wanted to be involved in everything ... and everything depended on him". Benvenuto Cellini also complained about him in his autobiography since he often urged him (on behalf of pope Clement VII) to complete unfinished commissions.

He was very active as bishop, causing Forlì to be "quoted as an example of orthodoxy and of religious zeal". His successor Antonio Giannotti (1563–1578) continued along the same lines and so in the 1560s the pathos in the Forli School of art "anticipated that of the Roman school in the 1570s".

== Note ==
Catholic Church titles
Preceded by Bernardo Antonio de' Medici	Bishop of Forlì; 1551-1563	Succeeded by Antonio Giannotti da Montagnana
