= Apostolic Nunciature to Savoy =

Former diplomatic mission of the Holy See in Europe

The Apostolic Nunciature to Savoy was an ecclesiastical office of the Catholic Church to the Duchy of Savoy, Italy. It was a diplomatic post of the Holy See, whose representative is called the Apostolic Nuncio with the rank of an ambassador. The office ceased to exist in 1795 soon after the Duchy of Savoy was occupied by French revolutionary forces in 1792 after the French Revolution .

== List of Apostolic Nuncios ==
=== 16th century ===
- François de Bachaud (June 3, 1560 - July 1, 1568 deceased)
- Vincenzo Lauro (November 23, 1568 - June 1, 1573 appointed Apostolic Nuncio to Poland)
- Girolamo Federici (June 15, 1573 - June 29, 1577 dismissed)
- Ottavio Santacroce (June 29, 1577 - September 15, 1580)
- Vincenzo Lauro (September 15, 1580 - May 10, 1585) (second term)
- Gian Ambrogio Fieschi (May 10, 1585 - January 1586 deceased)
- Giulio Ottinelli (February 12, 1586 - November 13, 1592 dismissed)
- Marcello Acquaviva (September 13, 1592 - April 1, 1595 dismissed)
- Giulio Cesare Riccardi (April 1, 1595 - August 2, 1601 dismissed)

=== 17th century ===
- Corrado Tartarini (August 2, 1601 - February 13, 1602 deceased)
- Paolo Tolosa, C.R. ( May 30, 1602 - June 12, 1606 resigned)
- Pietro Francesco Costa (June 12, 1606 - March 23, 1624 resigned)
- Lorenzo Campeggi (March 23, 1624 - July 3, 1627 resigned)
- Luigi Galli (July 3, 1627 - October 11, 1629 resigned)
- Alessandro Castracani (October 11, 1629 - July 30, 1634 resigned)
- Fausto Caffarelli (July 30, 1634 - May 4, 1641 resigned)
- Gasparo Cecchinelli (May 4, 1641 - April 4, 1644 resigned)
- Giovanni Battista Landi (April 16, 1644 - July 29, 1646 deceased)
- Alessandro Crescenzi (November 16, 1646 - December 30, 1658)
- Carlo Roberti de' Vittori (December 24, 1658 - April 28, 1664 appointed Apostolic Nuncio to France)
- Niccolo Pietro Bargellini (July 4, 1665 - February 11, 1668 appointed Apostolic Nuncio to France)
- Angelo Maria Ranuzzi (June 30, 1668 - May 13, 1671 appointed Apostolic Nuncio to Poland)
- Marcello Durazzo (June 17, 1671 - August 12, 1672 resigned)
- Fabrizio Spada (August 12, 1672 - January 3, 1674 appointed Apostolic Nuncio to France)
- Pietro Alberini (March 10, 1674 - November 1675 resigned)
- Giuseppe Mosti (February 20, 1676 - February 12, 1690 appointed Apostolic Nuncio to Spain)
- Ferdinando Strozza (June 8, 1690 - May 12, 1695 deceased)
- Alessandro Sforza (June 24, 1695 - April 8, 1701 deceased)

=== 18th century ===
- Alessandro Francesco Codebò (April 1701 - October 11, 1703) (internuncio)
- Bernardino Guinigi (October 11, 1703 - February 1707 dismissed) (internuncio)
- Raniero Felice Simonetti (October 7, 1711 - January 6, 1717 appointed Apostolic Nuncio to the Kingdom of Naples) (internuncio)
- Giovanni Carlo Antonelli (May 21, 1736 - 1739 dismissed) (internuncio)
- Ludovico Merlini (January 27, 1741 - December 27, 1753 dismissed)
- Emidio Ziucci (May 28, 1775 - September 1795 dismissed) (internuncio)
- Suppression of the Apostolic Nunciature (1753-1839)

=== 19th century ===
- Antonio Tosti (April 25, 1822 - January 15, 1829 appointed cleric of the Chamber) (Charge d'Affaires)
- Tommaso Pasquale Gizzi (January 5, 1829 - January 25, 1835 appointed internuncio in Belgium) (Charge d'Affaires)
- Ambrogio Campodonico (January 25, 1835 - 1839) (Charge d'Affaires)
- Vincenzo Massi (November 12, 1839 - January 10, 1841 deceased)
- Tommaso Pasquale Gizzi (June 1841 - January 21, 1844 created cardinal)
- Antonio Benedetto Antonucci (July 29, 1844 - April 1850 dismissed)
- Gaetano Tortone (1856-1891), pro-nuncio
