= Giulio Cesare Riccardi =

Most Reverend Giulio Cesare Riccardi
- Archbishop of Bari-Canosa
- Church: Catholic Church
- Diocese: Archdiocese of Bari-Canosa
- In office: 1592–1602
- Predecessor: Antonio Puteo
- Successor: Bonviso Bonvisi
- Previous post: Apostolic Nuncio to Savoy (1595–1601)

Orders
- Consecration: 15 Nov 1592 by Enrico Caetani

Personal details
- Died: 13 February 1602 Bari, Italy

Giulio Cesare Riccardi (died 13 Feb 1602) was a Roman Catholic prelate who served as Archbishop of Bari-Canosa (1592–1602) and Apostolic Nuncio to Savoy (1595–1601).

== Biography ==
On 30 Oct 1592, Giulio Cesare Riccardi was appointed during the papacy of Pope Clement VIII as Archbishop of Bari-Canosa. On 15 Nov 1592, he was consecrated bishop by Enrico Caetani, Cardinal-Priest of Santa Pudenziana, with Guillaume de St-Marcel d'Avançon, Archbishop of Embrun, and Leonard Abel, Titular Bishop of Sidon, serving as co-consecrators. On 1 Apr 1595, he was appointed during the papacy of Pope Clement VIII as Apostolic Nuncio to Savoy where he served until 2 Aug 1601. He served as Archbishop of Bari-Canosa until his death on 13 Feb 1602.

== External links and additional sources ==
- Cheney, David M. "Archdiocese of Bari-Bitonto". Catholic-Hierarchy.org. (for Chronology of Bishops) ^{[self-published]}
- Chow, Gabriel. "Metropolitan Archdiocese of Bari–Bitonto (Italy)". GCatholic.org. (for Chronology of Bishops) ^{[self-published]}
- Cheney, David M. "Nunciature to Savoy". Catholic-Hierarchy.org. (for Chronology of Bishops) ^{[self-published]}

Catholic Church titles
Preceded by Antonio Puteo	Archbishop of Bari-Canosa; 1592–1602	Succeeded by Bonviso Bonvisi
Preceded by Marcello Acquaviva	Apostolic Nuncio to Savoy; 1595–1601	Succeeded by Corrado Tartarini
