= Alessandro of Forlì =

Bishop of Forlì

Alessandro was a bishop of Forlì. He began his term in 1160. It was during his administration of the diocese that the episcopal palace was built.
