= Giacomo Theodoli =

17th-century Roman Catholic bishop

Most Reverend Giacomo Teodolo
- Bishop Emeritus of Forlì
- Church: Catholic Church
- Diocese: Diocese of Forlì
- In office: 1635–1665
- Predecessor: Cesare Bartorelli
- Successor: Claudio Ciccolini
- Previous post: Archbishop of Amalfi (1625–1635)

Orders
- Consecration: 20 April 1625 by Ottavio Bandini

Personal details
- Born: 14 March 1594 Rome, Italy
- Died: 21 March 1667 (age 73) Rome, Italy

Giacomo Theodoli or Giacomo Teodolo (1594–1643) was a Roman Catholic prelate who served as Archbishop (Personal Title) of Forlì (1635–1665) and Archbishop of Amalfi (1625–1635).

== Biography ==
Giacomo Theodoli was born on 14 Mar 1594 in Rome, Italy. On 7 Apr 1625, he was appointed during the papacy of Pope Urban VIII as Archbishop of Amalfi. On 20 Apr 1625, he was consecrated bishop by Ottavio Bandini, Cardinal-Bishop of Porto e Santa Rufina. On 7 May 1635, he was appointed during the papacy of Pope Urban VIII as Archbishop (Personal Title) of Forlì. He served as Bishop of Forlì until his resignation in 1665. He died in Rome, Italy.

== Episcopal succession ==
Episcopal succession of Giacomo Theodoli

While bishop, he was the principal consecrator of Luigi Riccio, Bishop of Vico Equense (1628);

and the principal co-consecrator of:

- Gaetano Cossa, Archbishop of Otranto (1635);
- Francesco Antonio Porpora, Bishop of Montemarano (1635);
- Ascenzio Guerrieri, Bishop of Castellaneta (1635);
- Mario Theodoli, Bishop of Imola (1644);
- Carlo Pio di Savoia, Bishop of Ferrara (1655);
- Francesco Tirotta, Bishop of Squillace (1665);
- Cesare Ugolini, Bishop of Grosseto (1665);
- Jeronim de Andreis, Bishop of Korčula (1665);
- Federico Baldeschi Colonna, Titular Archbishop of Caesarea in Cappadocia (1665);
- Baltasar Valdés y Noriega, Bishop of Gaeta (1665); and
- Diego della Chiesa, Bishop of Nice (1665).

Catholic Church titles
Preceded by Paolo Emilio Filonardi	Archbishop of Amalfi; 1625–1635	Succeeded by Matteo Granito
Preceded by Cesare Bartorelli	Archbishop (Personal Title) of Forlì; 1635–1665	Succeeded by Claudio Ciccolini
