= Carlo Bonelli =

Italian lawyer and diplomat (1612–1676)

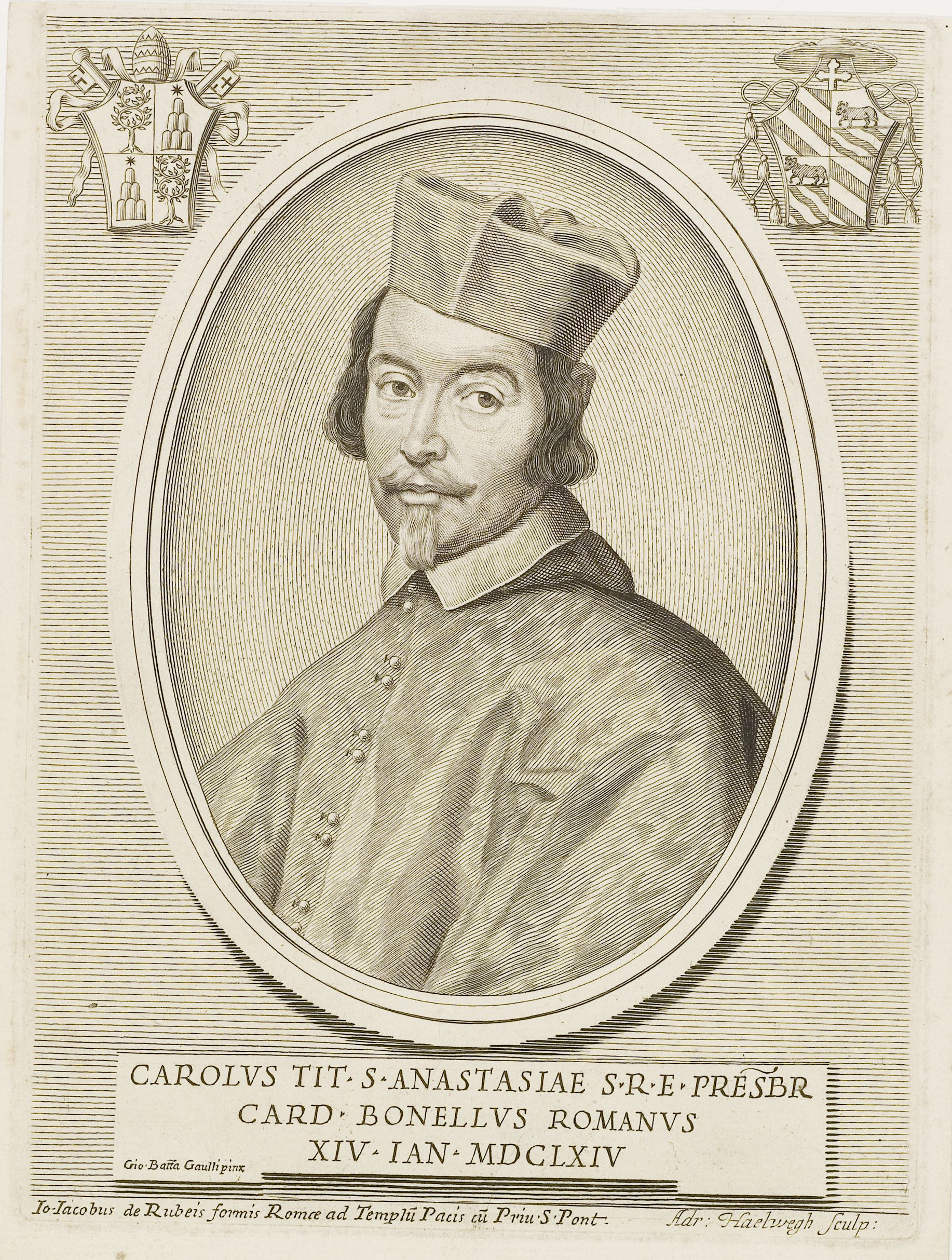
- Born: 1612
- Died: 1676 (aged 63–64)
- Occupations: lawyer and diplomat
- Known for: cardinal of the Roman Catholic Church in 1664

Carlo Bonelli (1612–1676) was an Italian lawyer and diplomat who was appointed a cardinal of the Roman Catholic Church in 1664.

== Life ==
Carlo Bonelli dei marchesi di Cassano was born in 1612, the great-great-grand-nephew of Pope Pius V. He received his doctorate in law from the University of Perugia and was appointed private chamberlain to Pope Urban VIII. His career in the Roman Curia resulted in appointments as governor of several cities of the Papal States, including Rome, then as vice-camerlengo from 15 April 1655 to 18 October 1656, when he was appointed to the titular position of Latin Archbishop of Corinth. Fortified by the title, he was sent as nuncio extraordinary to Philip IV of Spain to establish peace among the Christian princes, 27 October 1656. With the Treaty of the Pyrenees signed in 1659, he remained in Madrid as ordinary nuncio until 1664. When he was recalled to Rome and made cardinal in the consistory of 14 January 1664, with the titulus of S. Anastasia, he brought with him the auditor of the papal legation at the court of Madrid, the antiquarian Raffaello Fabretti, who took advantage of Bonelli's leisurely return through the south of France to extend his knowledge of Roman antiquities.

Bonelli died on 27 August 1676. His tomb by Carlo Rainaldi in Santa Maria sopra Minerva, Rome, has not been admired by art historians.

== Sources ==
- Cardinals of the Holy Roman Church: Carlo Bonelli
