= Our Lady of the Fire =

Italian Catholic Marian title

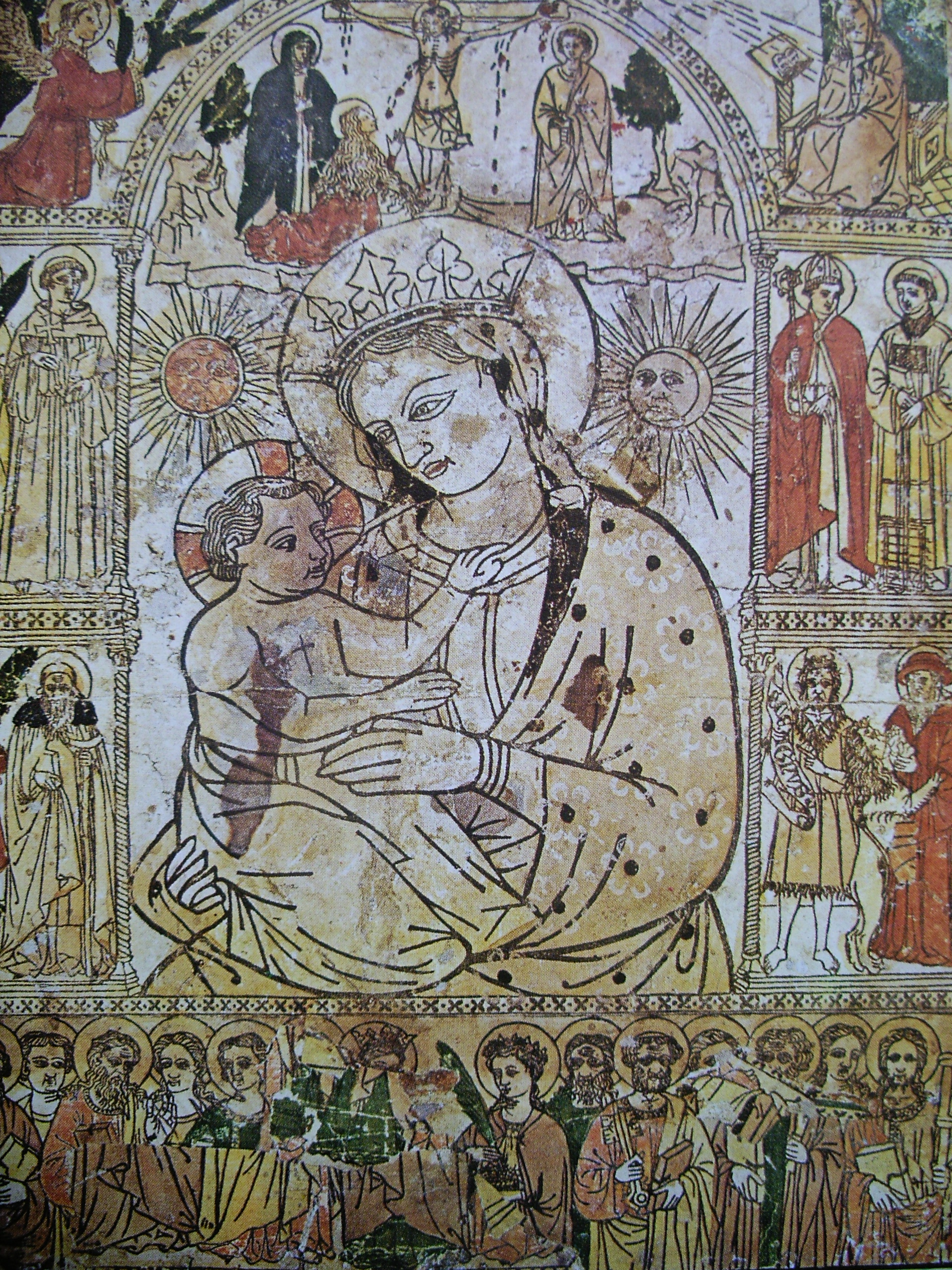
The Madonna of the Fire (late 14th or early 15th century)

Our Lady of the Fire (Italian: Madonna del Fuoco) is an early 15th-century image of the Madonna and Child, venerated by Catholics in Forlì and considered by them to be the protector of salt workers since the 17th century.She is the patroness saint of Forli.

== History ==
This early Italian devotional print was displayed in a school in Forli. It survived the 1428 fire that destroyed the school, and was subsequently venerated and moved to the city's cathedral, Santa Croce.

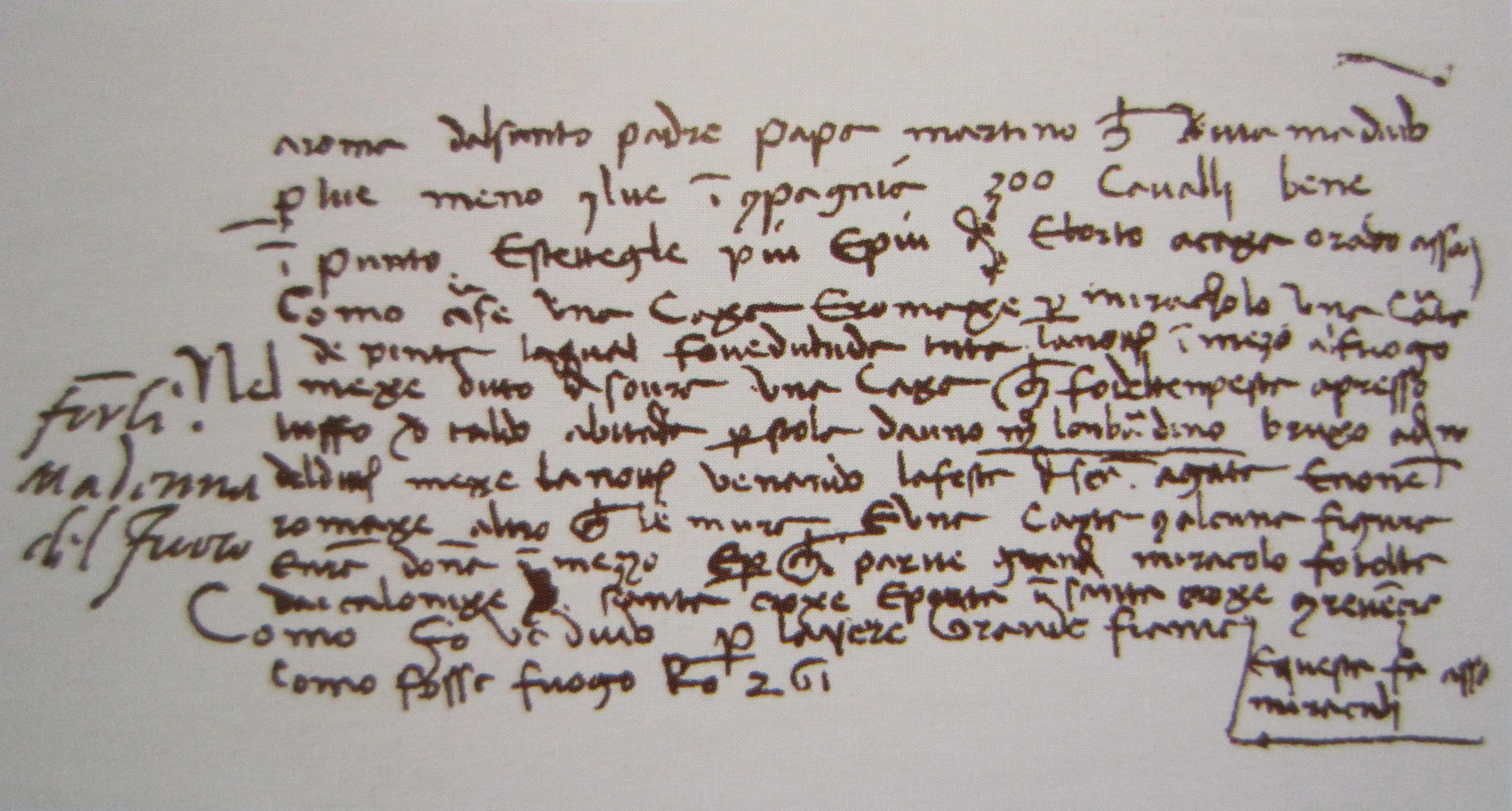
Page from the chronicle of Giovanni di Mastro Pedrino relating to the miraculous event (15th century)

In memory of the fire, one or more small lights are displayed from the windows of the houses of Forlì during the night on 4 and 5 February. The streets between the main squares are lined with stands selling sweets, clothing, and games. The Piadina della Madonna is an oval-shaped sweet bread with anise seeds.

== Description ==
The image is a hand-coloured woodcut almost twenty inches high and sixteen inches wide. The Virgin is shown with the Child, while the sun and moon stand on either side. It also depicts annunciation and crucifixion scenes, as well as various saints.

== Prayer ==
"O Lord, You miraculously protected and preserved the image of the Mother of Your beloved Son from the destruction of fire. Grant that through her merits and intercession, we may escape the fire of hell thanks to the fire of Your love. Through Jesus Christ, our Lord. Amen."

== Bibliography ==
- Bezzi, Giuliano; del Buono, Floriano; Cimatti, Giovanni (1637). Il fuoco trionfante : racconto della traslatione della miracolo.a imagine detta la Mado[n]na del fuoco, protettrice della città di Forli: solenizzata da esse città sotto li XX. di ottobre MDCXXXVI. OCLC 891123517.*
