= Forlì Cathedral =

- Cathedral of the Holy Cross
- Cattedrale di Santa Croce
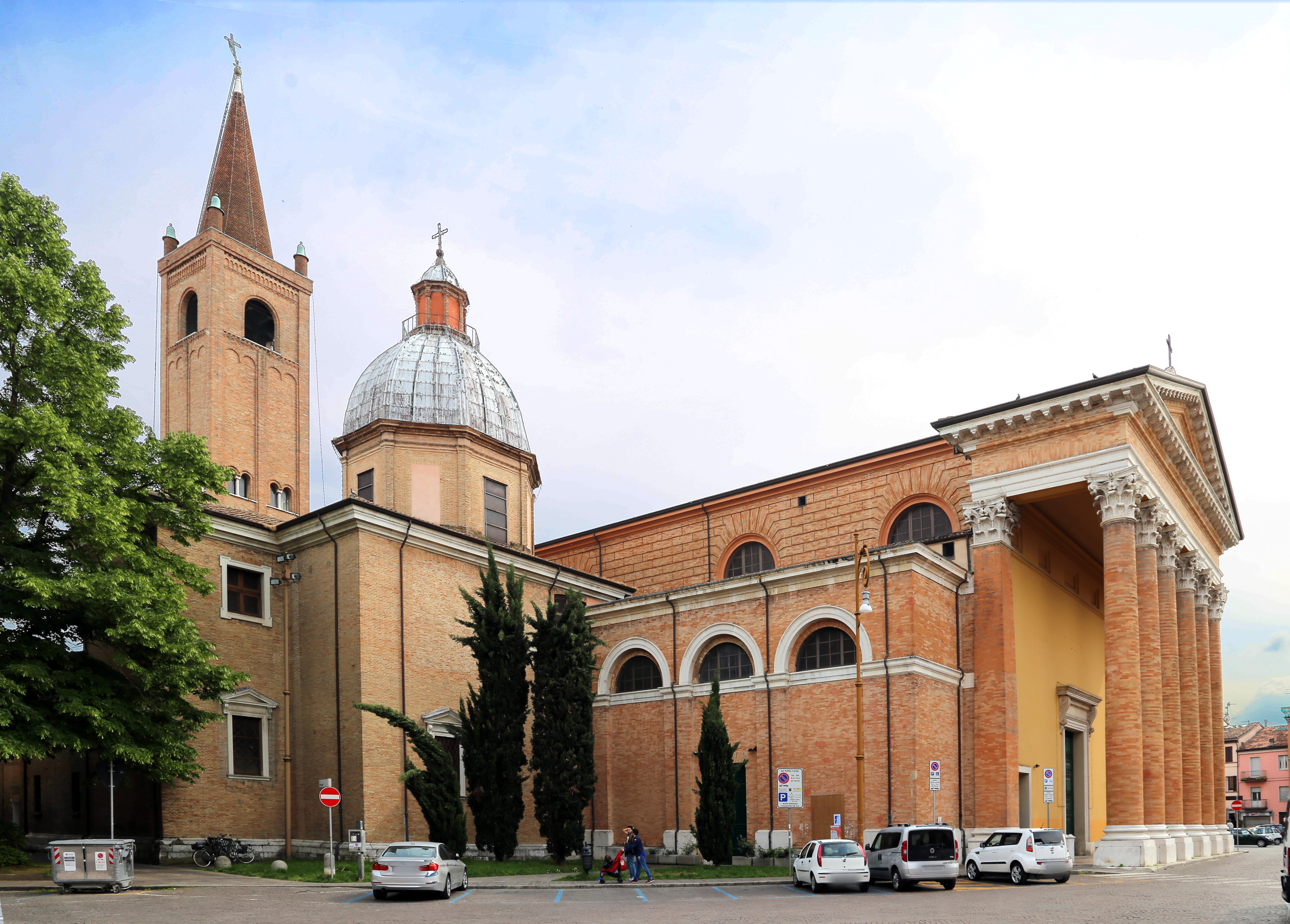
- Forlì Cathedral
- 44°13′25.32″N 12°2′17.66″E
- Location: Forlì, Emilia-Romagna
- Country: Italy
- Denomination: Roman Catholic
- Tradition: Roman Rite

Architecture
- Architectural type: Neoclassical
- Completed: 1841

Administration
- Archdiocese: Ravenna-Cervia
- Diocese: Forlì-Bertinoro

Forlì Cathedral, otherwise the Cathedral of the Holy Cross (Italian: Cattedrale di Santa Croce; Duomo di Forlì), is the Roman Catholic cathedral of Forlì, Emilia-Romagna, Italy. Formerly the seat of the bishop of Forlì, it has been since 1986 the episcopal seat of the Diocese of Forlì-Bertinoro.

== History ==
The cathedral of Santa Croce existed as early as 562. In 1419 Pope Martin V ordered restorations that were completed in 1475. It was almost entirely rebuilt in 1841, with the principal exception of the 17th-century chapel of the Madonna del Fuoco; the sacred image contained there was formerly in a private house, where it remained unharmed during a fire.

== Notable maestri di cappella ==
- Giulio Belli (around 1600)
- Clemente Monari (1713–1729)
- Gasparo Garavaglia (around 1752)
- Ignazio Cirri (1759–1787)
- Giovanni Battista Cirri (1787–1808)
- Andrea Favi (1808–1822)

== Further sources ==
- Guida per la Città di Forlì. Tipografia Casali. Forlì, 1838
- Brunelli, Domenico; Zoli, Angelo (1862): Cenni storici sulla Cattedrale di Forlì. Forlì, Stabilimento Tip. Croppi
- Calzini, E.; Mazzatinti, G. (1893): Guida di Forlì. Luigi Bordandini Editore Tipografo. Forlì
- Viroli, Giordano (1994): Chiese di Forlì. Nuova Alfa Editoriale per Cassa dei Risparmi di Forlì
- D'Altri, Sivia (2000): Il Duomo di Santa Croce in Forlì. Guide d’arte e di storia a cura della coop. "Il Laboratorio". Costa Editore. Realizzata dalla Fondazione della Cassa dei Risparmi di Forlì
