= The Repentant Magdalene (Cagnacci) =

Oil painting of the early 1660s by Guido Cagnacci

- La Maddalena penitente (Italian)
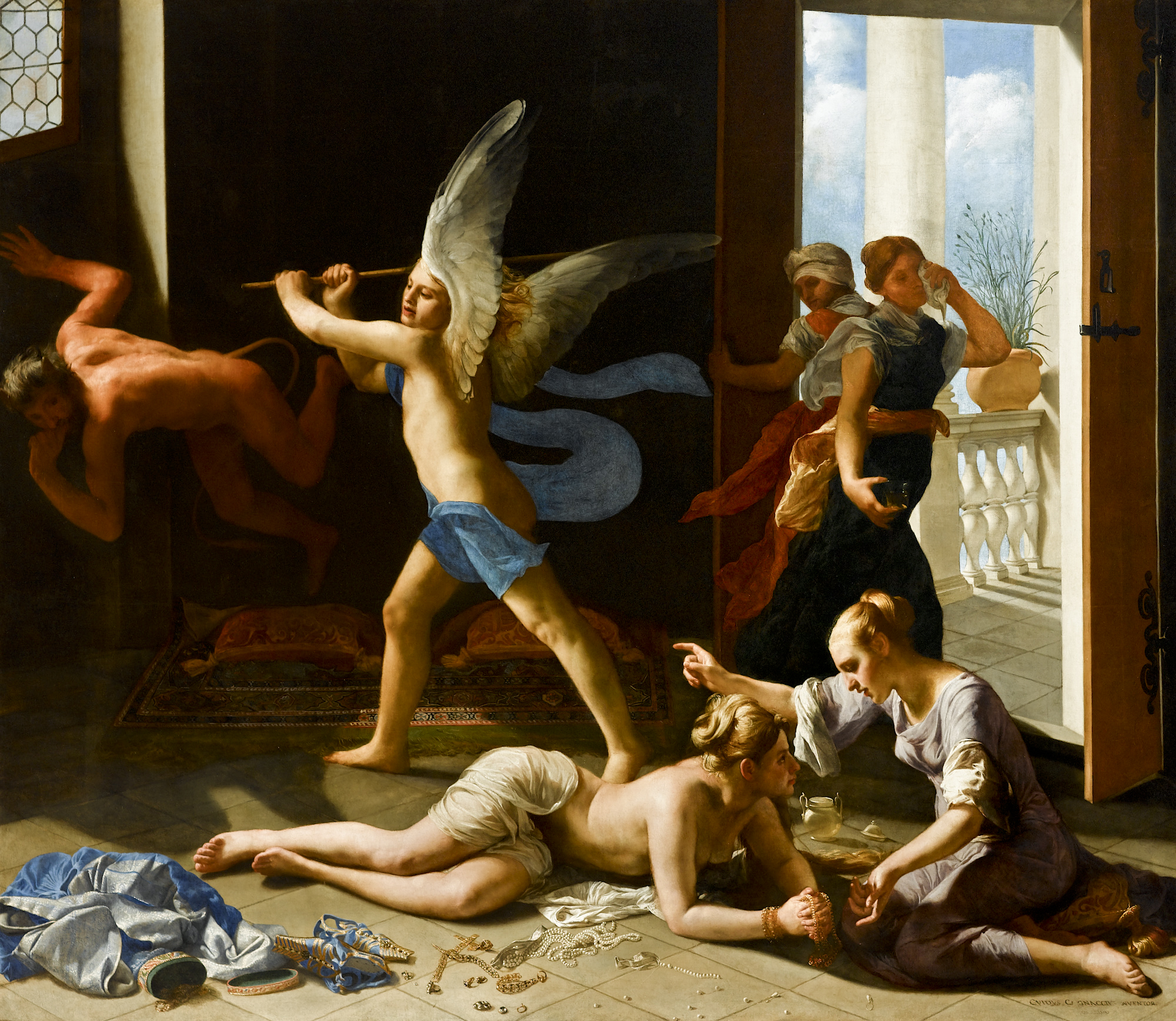
- Artist: Guido Cagnacci
- Year: c. 1660−1663
- Medium: Oil on canvas
- Dimensions: 229.2 cm × 266.1 cm (90.2 in × 104.8 in)
- Location: Norton Simon Museum; Pasadena

The Repentant Magdalene, also called The Conversion of Mary Magdalene, is an oil painting of the early 1660s by the Baroque Italian painter Guido Cagnacci. It shows Mary Magdalene, beside her remonstrating sister Martha, at the moment she repents, echoed by an allegorical pairing of Virtue, an angel, chasing out Vice, a devil. The painting is at the collection of the Norton Simon Museum, in Pasadena.

== Provenance ==
The painting's owners have been:

- Dukes of Mantua by 1665, Duke Carlo II, villa Marmirolo and villa Favorita
- Duke Ferdinand Carlo Gonzaga, 10th and last Duke of Mantua in 1706, transported to Venice 1707; upon his death, transported 5 July 1708 to Padua, (sale, Venice, 1711, )
- purchased by Christian Cole, and transported to England in April, 1711
- Henry Bentinck (1st Duke of Portland by 1716), Bulstrode House; Harcourt House by 1854
- Dukes of Portland, Welbeck Abbey and London
- by descent to Lady Anne Bentinck, Welbeck Abbey (sold at Christie's, London, 11 December 1981, lot 52)
- P.D. Colnaghi & Co., London
- Norton Simon Art Foundation

== See also ==
- Penitent Magdalene (Caravaggio)
- Penitent Magdalene (Titian, 1565)
