= Guido Cagnacci =

Italian painter (1601–1663)

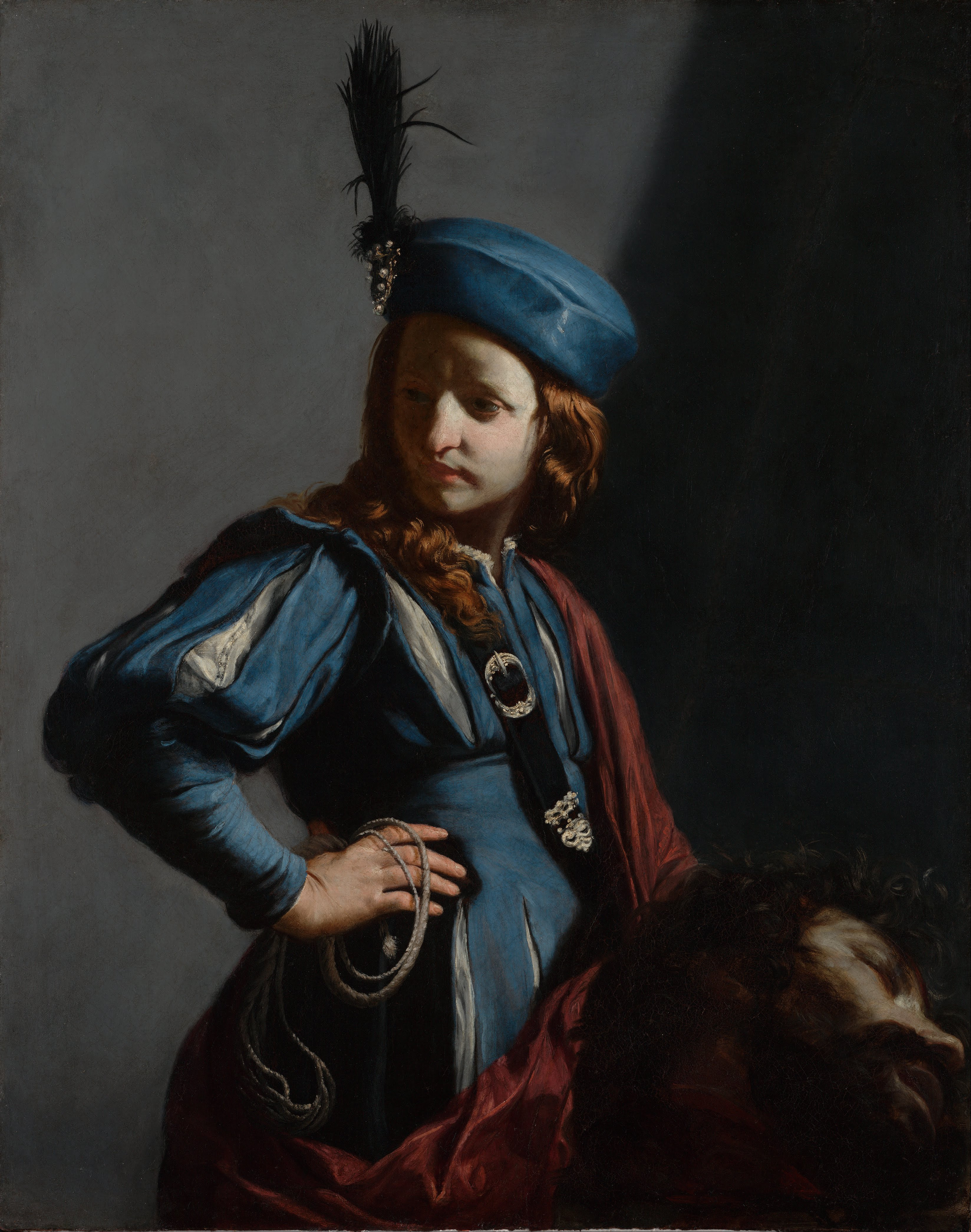
David with the Head of Goliath (c. 1645–50)

Guido Cagnacci (Italian: [kaɲˈɲattʃi]; 13 January 1601 – 1663) was an Italian Baroque painter originally from Santarcangelo di Romagna. His mature works are characterized by their use of chiaroscuro and their sensual subjects. He was influenced by the masters of the Bolognese School.

== Biography ==
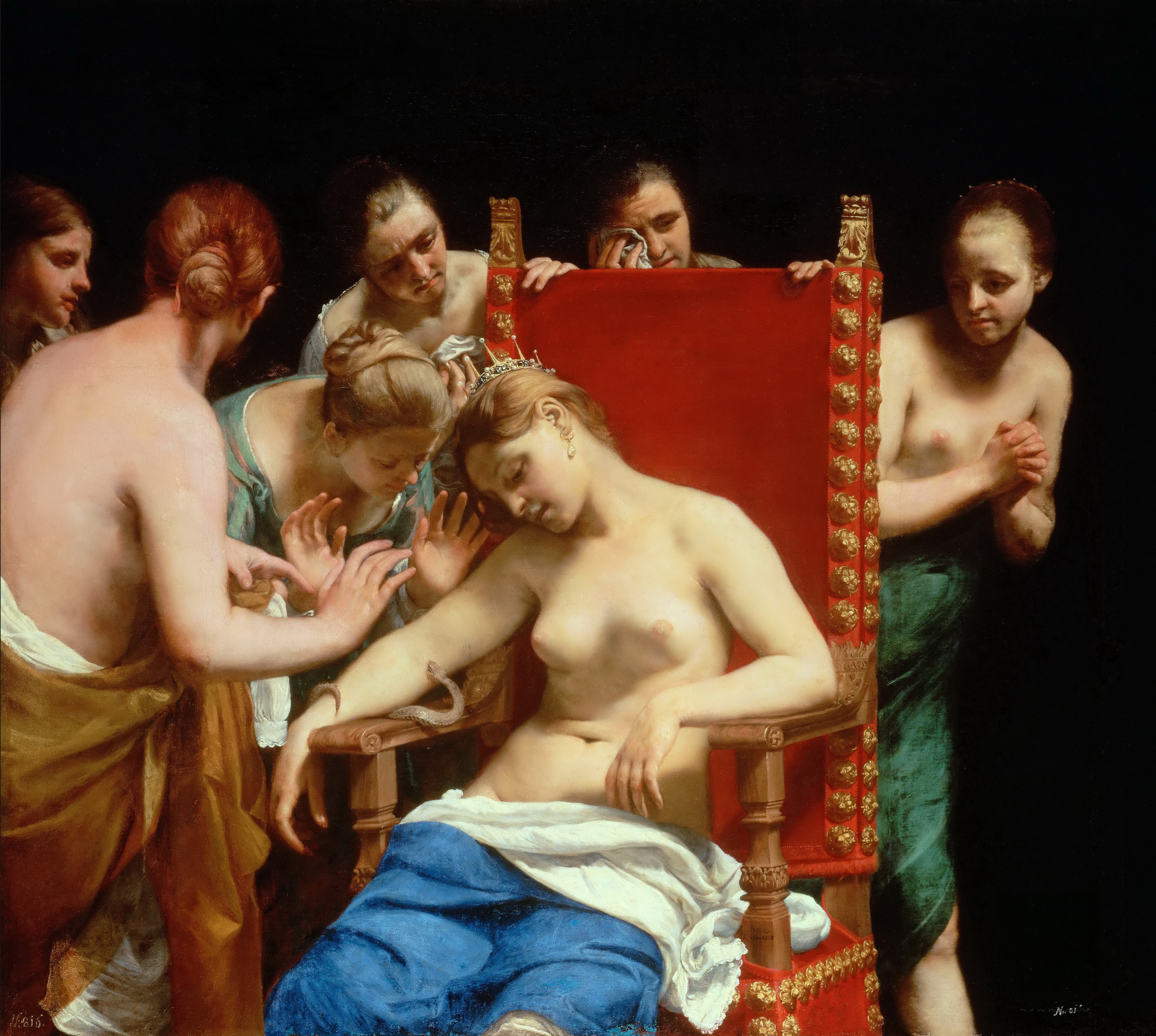
The Death of Cleopatra (1658)

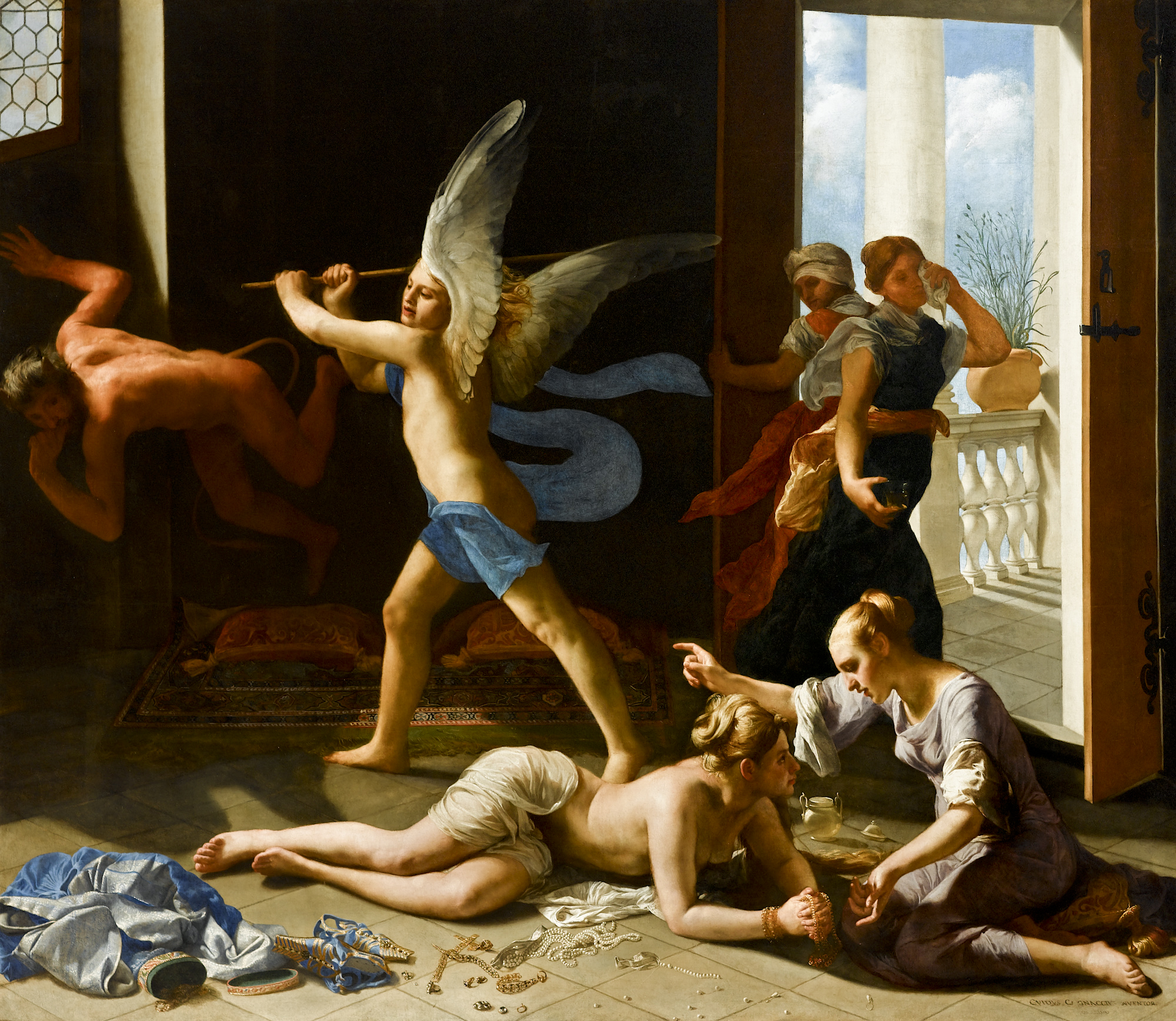
The Repentant Magdalene

Guido Cagnacci was born on 13 January 1601 in the small city of Santarcangelo di Romagna to Matteo Cagnacci, a tanner and furrier, and Livia Serra. His mother (Serra) came from the province of Cesena; the origins of his paternal family, however, are altogether uncertain. Some documents suggest that the Cagnacci came from Castel Durante, but it is also possible that they hailed from Rimini, where Matteo moved in 1618.

Not much is known about Guido's early life or training as a painter, though he is widely characterized as an autodidact. According to Giovan Battista Costa (the artist's eighteenth-century biographer), Cagnacci "had been given such marvelous talent from nature to become a painter that he began to practice this noble art all by himself and one could say almost without master." It was probably due to this precocious talent that Matteo Cagnacci decided to send his son away from his birthplace for more formal training.

From 1617 to 1621, Matteo supported his son's education in Bologna, where he stayed with the nobleman Girolamo Leoni; the father paid also ostensibly for two trips to Rome, where his son lodged with Guercino. Although the identity of his master during this early period remains uncertain, Ludovico Carracci and Guido Reni are cited popularly as the young artist's Bolognese teachers.

Cagnacci worked in Rimini from 1627 to 1642. After that, he moved to work in Forlì, where he would have been able to observe the paintings of Melozzo.

Before living in Forlì he had been in Rome, where he had come in contact with Guercino, Guido Reni and Simon Vouet. He may have had an apprenticeship with the elderly Ludovico Carracci in Bologna. His initial output includes many devotional subjects. But moving to Venice under the name of Guido or Guidobaldo Canlassi da Bologna, he renewed a friendship with Nicolas Regnier, and dedicated himself to private salon paintings. These often depicted sensuous naked women from thigh upwards, including Lucretia, Cleopatra, and Mary Magdalene. This allies him to a strand of courtly painting, epitomized in Florence by Francesco Furini, Simone Pignoni and others. In 1649, he moved to Venice, where he took pupils, established a workshop, and had considerable success. Although harshly criticized by the Venetian painters Pietro Liberi and Marco Boschini, his work found favor with collectors and gained great popularity through reproductive prints. In 1658, he traveled to Vienna, where he remained under patronage of the Emperor Leopold I.

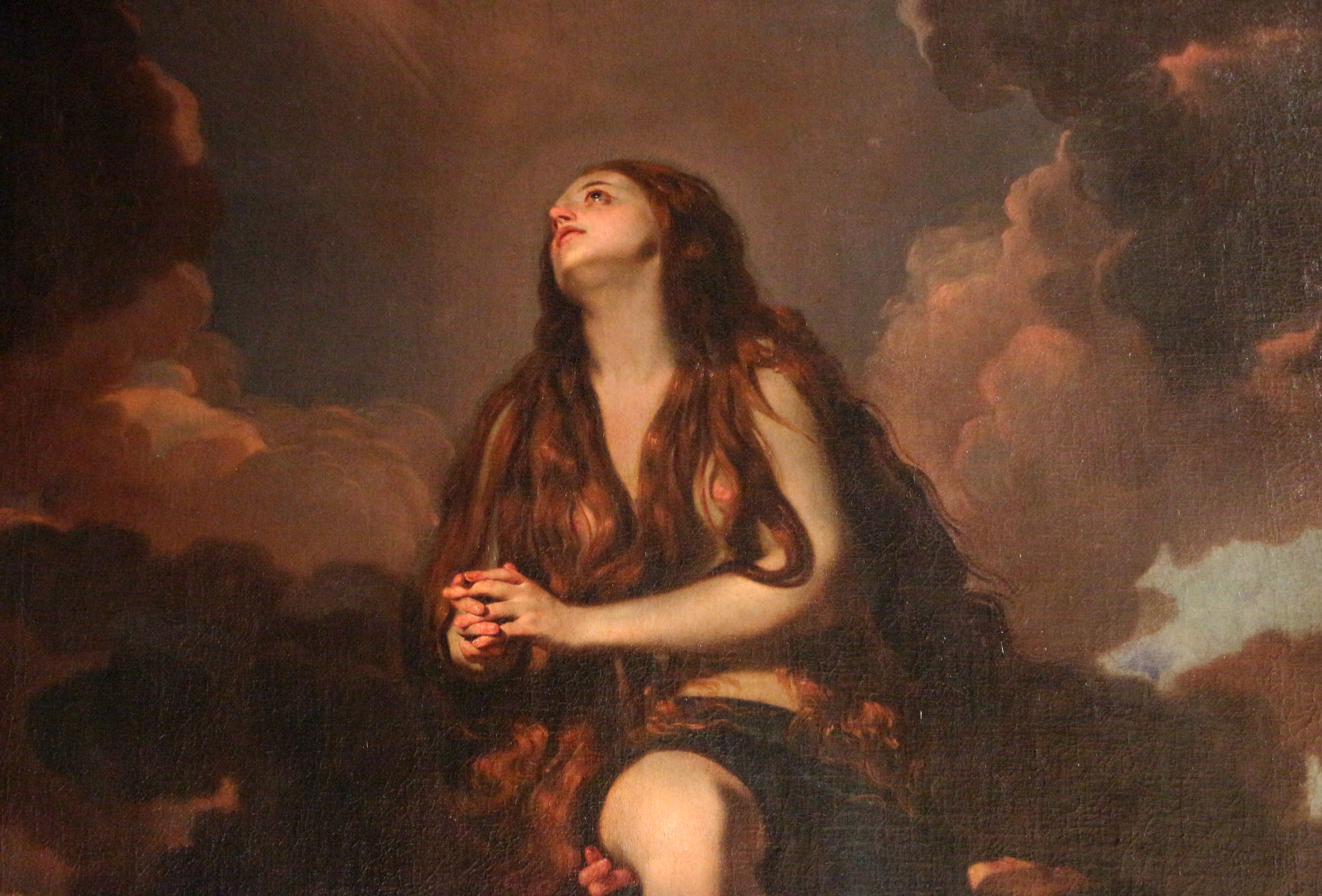
Mary Magdalene taken to heaven

His life was often tempestuous, as can be characterized by the 1628 episode of a failed elopement with an aristocratic widow. Some contemporaries describe him as eccentric, "unreliable and of doubtful morality". He is said to have enjoyed the company of female models dressed as men. He died in Vienna in 1663.

Art historian Pier Giorgio Pasini says Cagnacci's art "was highly appreciated, as is demonstrated by contemporary eulogies (Mazzoni, and Martinioni in Sansovino) and by the summons (c. 1660) to Vienna to be court painter to Emperor Leopold I". His work remained popular in the 18th century, but subsequently fell into obscurity until reassessed by modern critics. The artist's rediscovery began in 1959 with the Seicento Bolognese exhibition. Art historian Luisa Vertova says the inconsistent quality of Cagnacci's work is bewildering: "his compositions amount to little more than empirical juxtapositions in uncertain spaces, his backdrops ... are rickety cardboard stage-flats", and "puffy ears and uncouth hands are attached to torsos modelled with great sensibility to skin-surface, but his inventive capacity is rudimentary. Nevertheless, in moments of inspiration this uncultivated painter succeeds in creating forceful images which are hard to forget." Gloria Fossi says his painting is "warm with the heightened tones of grazing light, rich in the play of shadows and colors."

== Selected works ==
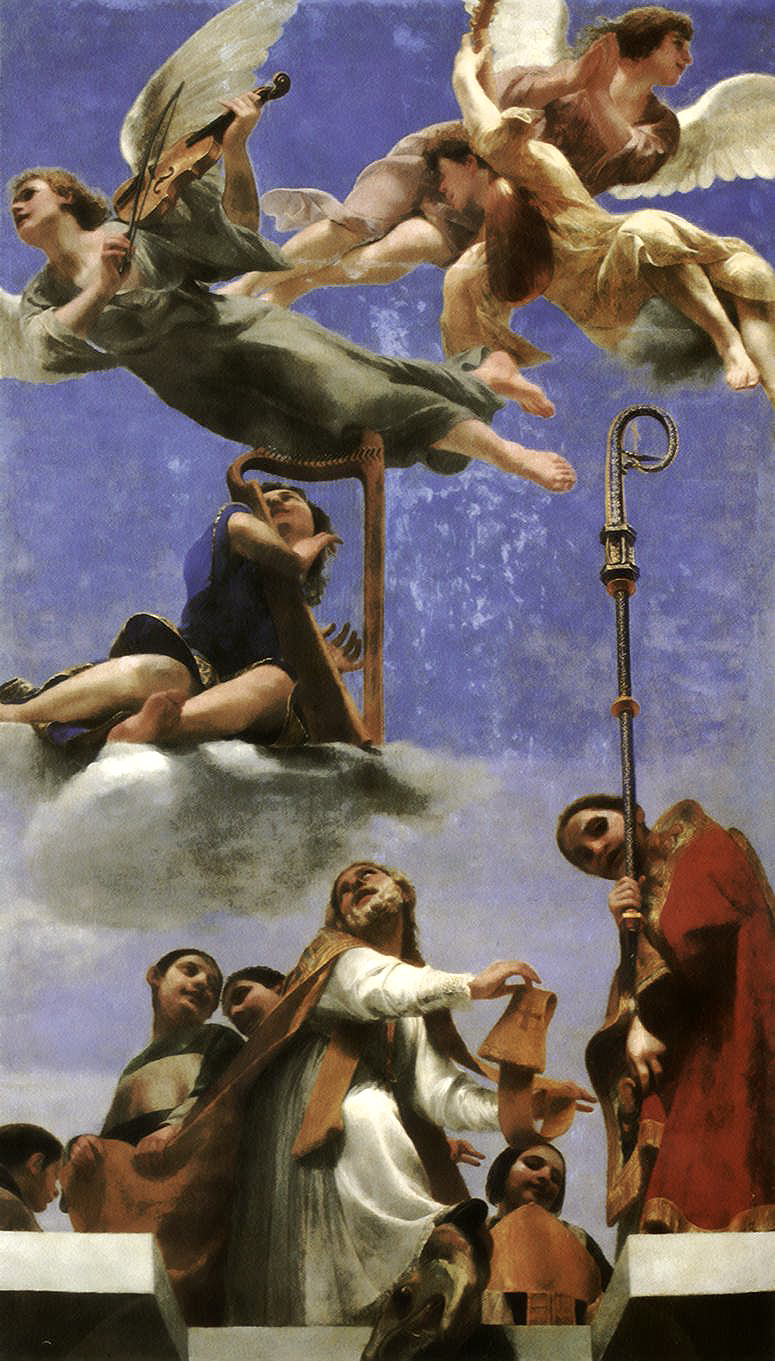
Glory of Sts Valerian & Mercurial (1642–3)

- Saint Sisto pope (1627), Museo di Saludecio e del Beato Amato, Saludecio, Rimini - Italy
- Procession of the Holy Sacrament (1628) Museo di Saludecio e del Beato Amato, Saludecio, Rimini - Italy
- Christ with Saints Joseph and Eligius (1635)
- Madonna with saints Andre Corsini Teresa and Maria Maddalena de' Pazzi (1640, Santarcangelo di Romagna)
- Frescoes in Cappella della Madonna del Fuoco (Duomo, Forlì)
- Allegory of spheral Astrology (Pinacoteca civica, Forlì)
- Glory of Saints Valerian and Mercurial (Faenza)
- Leopold I portrait (Vienna)
- Calling of Saint Matthew (Museo della Città - Rimini)
- Allegorical Naked Figure (private)
- The Death of Cleopatra (Pinacoteca di Brera, Milan)
- Death of Cleopatra (Kunsthistorisches Museum, Gemäldegalerie, Vienna)
- Death of Lucretia
- The Repentant Magdalene (Norton Simon Museum)

== Gallery ==
St Jerome

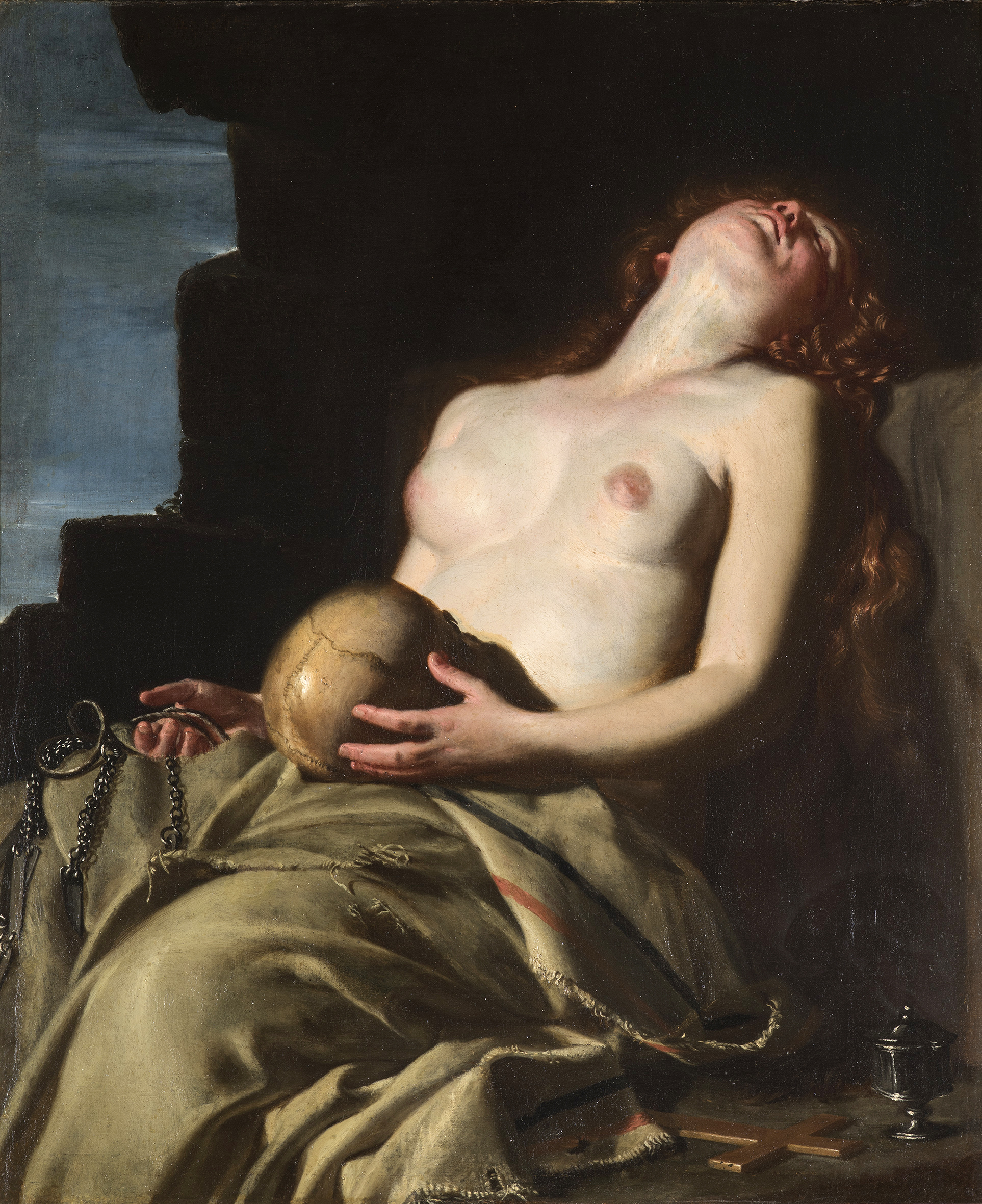
Maria Magdalena

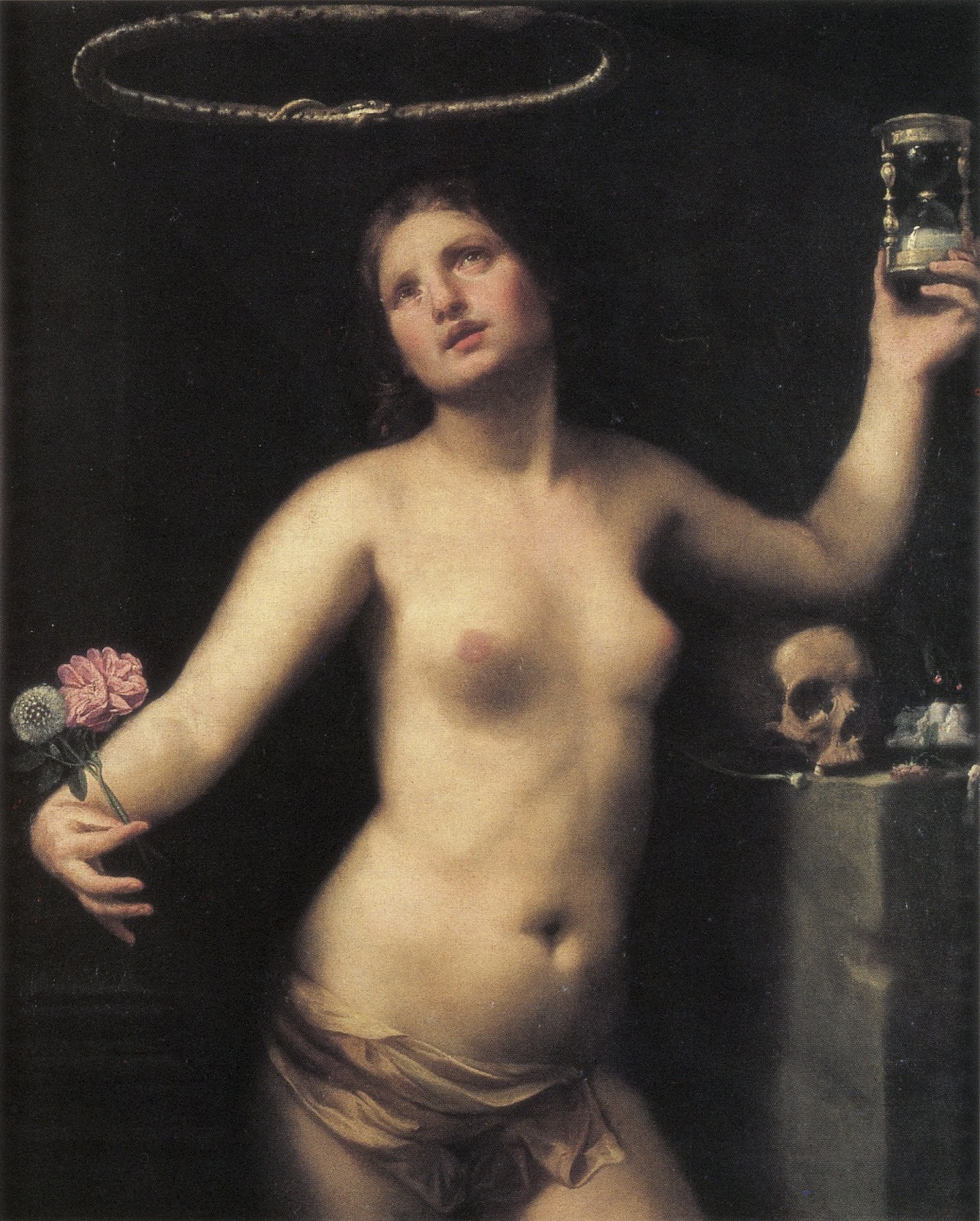
Allegory

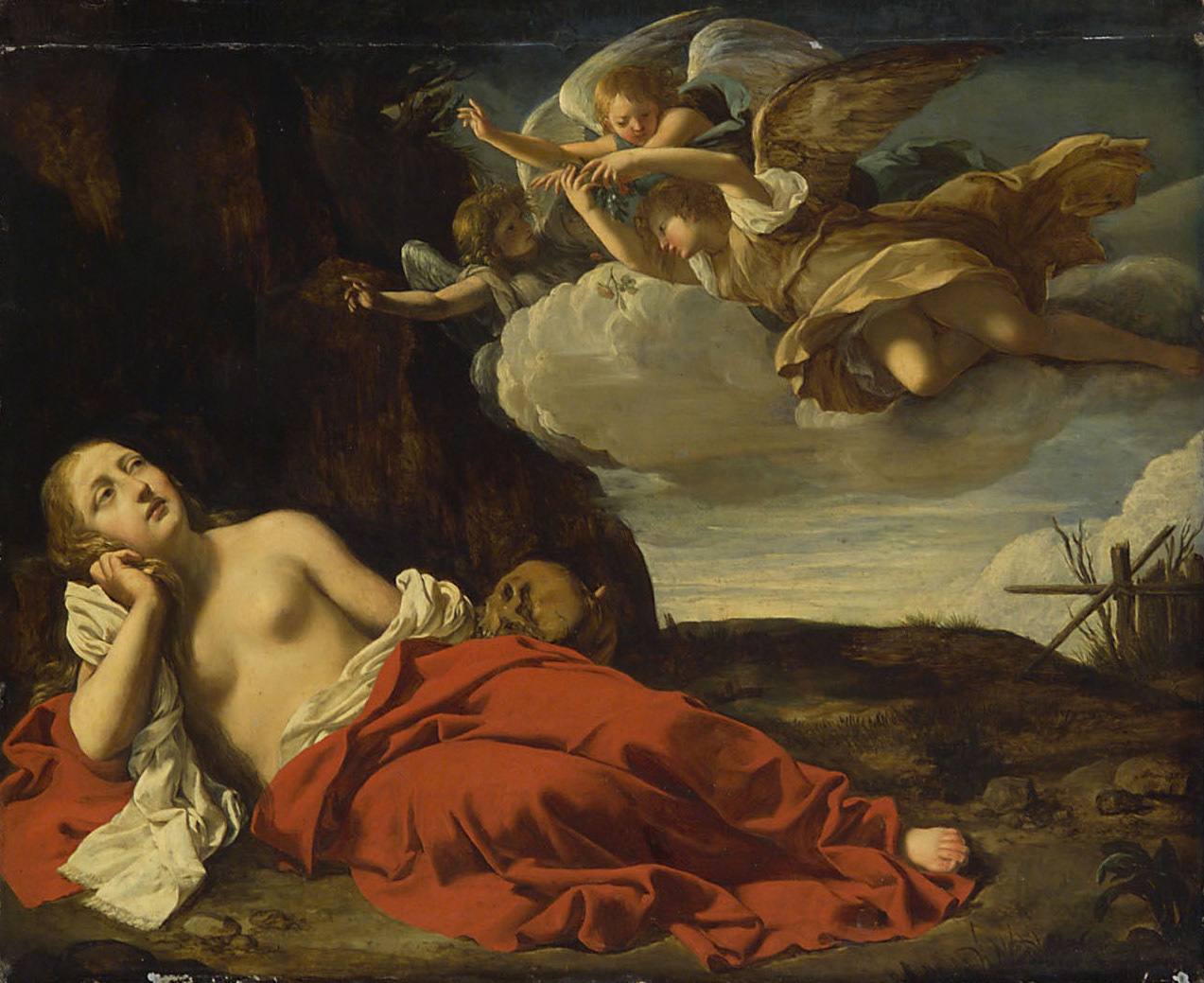
Maria Magdalena with angels

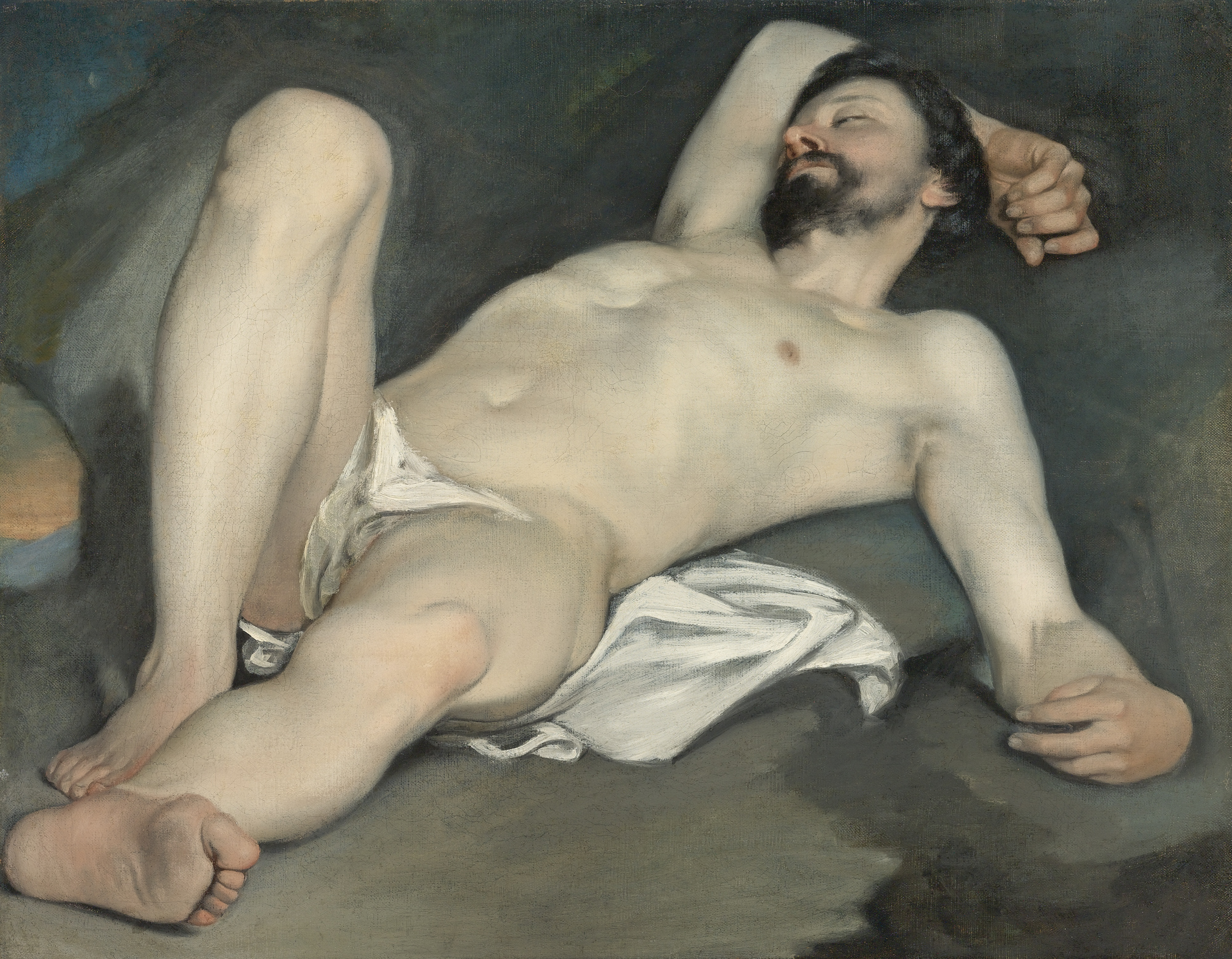
Reclining male nude
