= Mercurialis of Forlì =

Christian bishop of Forlì

Mercurialis (Italian: Mercuriale) was the Christian bishop of Forlì, in Romagna.

== Biography ==
The historical figure known as Mercurialis attended the Council of Rimini in 359 and died around 406. He was a zealous opponent of paganism and Arianism.

He has come to be venerated as Saint Mercurialis, around which fanciful legends have sprung. The legend states that he was the first bishop of Forlì, during the Apostolic Age, and saved the city by killing a dragon. He has often been depicted in this act, imagery that resembles that associated with St. George. His feast day is May 23.

The cathedral of Forlì is named after him.
