= Diocese of Forlì-Bertinoro =

Roman Catholic diocese in Italy

Coordinates: 44.2225°N 12.0408°E

Diocese of Forlì-Bertinoro Dioecesis Foroliviensis-Brittinoriensis

Catholic
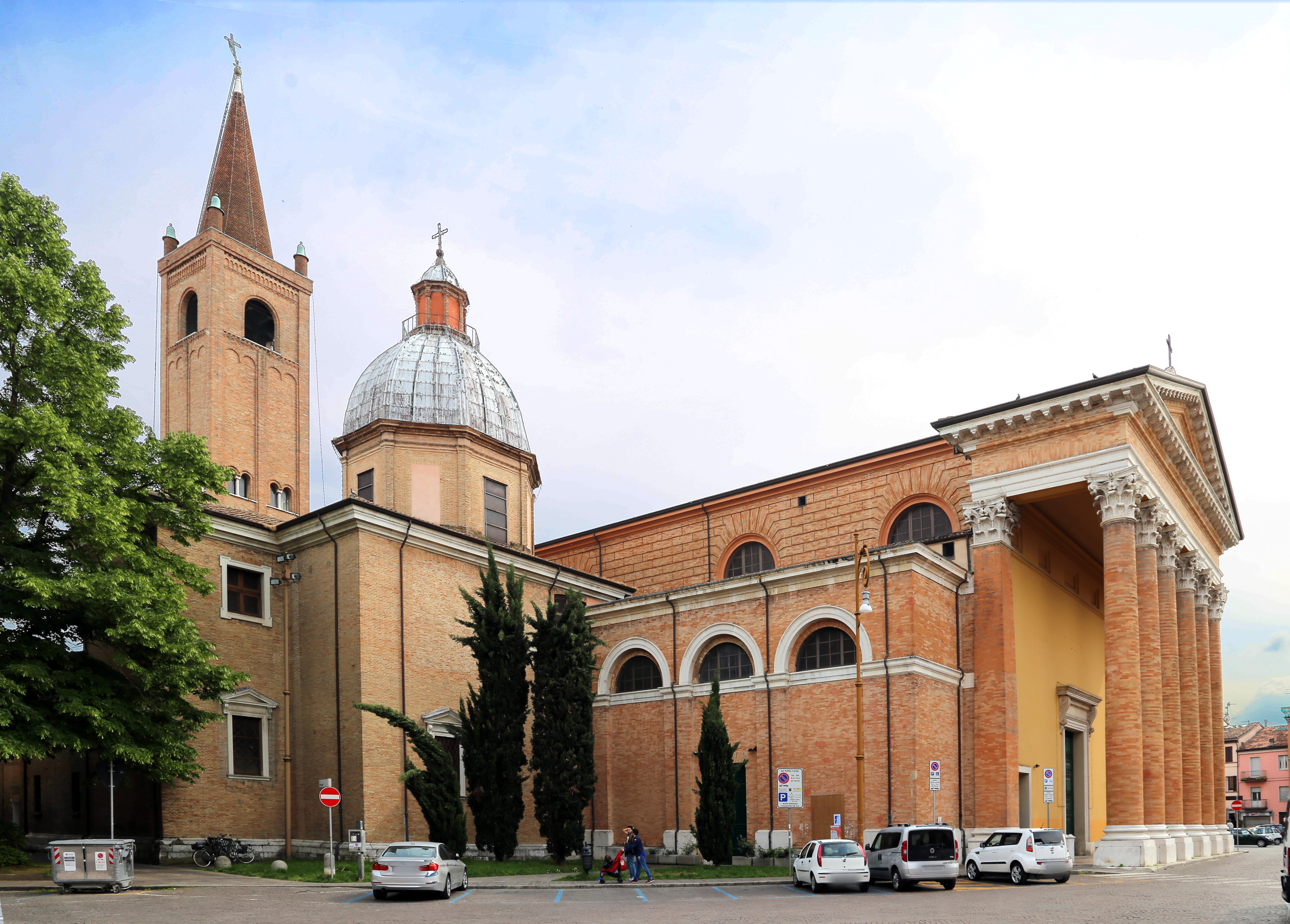
- Forlì Cathedral

Location
- Country: Italy
- Ecclesiastical province: Ravenna-Cervia

Statistics
- Area: 1,182 km^{2} (456 sq mi)
- Population: Total; Catholics: (as of 2023); 189,800 (est.); 177,800 (est.) (94.0%)
- Parishes: 128

Information
- Denomination: Catholic Church
- Rite: Roman Rite
- Established: 4th century ?
- Cathedral: Cattedrale di S. Croce (Forlì)
- Co-cathedral: Concattedrale di S. Caterina (Bertinoro)
- Secular priests: 83 (diocesan) ▼16 (Religious Orders) ▼14 Permanent Deacons ▲

Current leadership
- Pope: Leo XIV
- Bishop: Livio Corazza
- Bishops emeritus: Lino Pizzi

Website
- www.diocesiforli.it

The Diocese of Forlì-Bertinoro (Latin: Dioecesis Foroliviensis-Brittinoriensis) is a Latin diocese of the Catholic Church in Romagna, Italy. Until 1986 it was known as the Diocese of Forlì, in existence perhaps from the fourth century. In that year the Diocese of Bertinoro was united to it. The diocese is suffragan to the Archdiocese of Ravenna-Cervia.

== History ==
St. Mercurialis is considered the first bishop of Forlì, and has been said to belong to the second century; he is also said to be the Mercurialis who was allegedly present at the Council of Rimini in 359. Both assertions are based on legends of the 11th or 12th century.

On 12 July 1173, a major fire destroyed nearly all of the city of Forlì, including the episcopal palace, the cathedral with its annexes, the other churches, and the monastery of S. Mercuriale, which housed the archives. In 1353, another large fire destroyed the district of S. Mercuriale in Forlì and damaged large parts of the rest of the city.

On 8 July 1286, Archbishop Bonifacio Fieschi de' Conti di Lavagna of Ravenna presided over a provincial council, held in Forlì. It was attended by the bishops of Imola, Faenza, Forlimpopoli, Ceseena, Sarsina, Adria, and Bishop Rinaldus of Forlì, as well as procurators of the bishops of Bologna, Cervia, Modena, and Parma.

In 1769, the Cathedral of the cathedral of the Holy Cross was staffed and administered by a Chapter, consisting of four dignities (not dignitaries) and nineteen Canons. The dignities were: the Provost, the Archpriest, the Archdeacon, and the Primicerius."

Bishop Giacomo Theodoli (1635–1665) held his second diocesan synod in Forlì on 5 May 1639. He had previously held a synod, at some time between 1635 and 1639. Bishop Claudio Ciccolini (1666–1688) held a diocesan synod on 22 April 1675.

=== Consolidation of dioceses ===
The Second Vatican Council (1962–1965), in order to ensure that all Catholics received proper spiritual attention, decreed the reorganization of the diocesan structure of Italy and the consolidation of small and struggling dioceses. These considerations applied to Forlì and Bertinoro. Forlì claimed a Catholic population of 178,000, with 112 priests. Bertinoro, in 1980 had only 37,650 Catholics, but 64 priests.

On 18 February 1984, the Vatican and the Italian State signed a new and revised concordat. Based on the revisions, a set of Normae was issued on 15 November 1984, which was accompanied in the next year, on 3 June 1985, by enabling legislation. According to the agreement, the practice of having one bishop govern two separate dioceses at the same time, aeque personaliter, was abolished. This applied to Bishop Giovanni Proni, who had been Bishop of Bertinoro since 10 March 1970, and at the same time Bishop of Forlì since 9 June 1976.

Instead, the Vatican continued consultations which had begun under Pope John XXIII for the merging of small dioceses, especially those with personnel and financial problems, into one combined diocese. On 30 September 1986, Pope John Paul II ordered that the dioceses of Forlì and Bertinoro be merged into one diocese with one bishop, with the Latin title Dioecesis Foroliviensis-Brittinoriensis. The seat of the diocese was to be in Forlì, and the cathedral of Forli was to serve as the cathedral of the merged dioceses. The cathedral in Bertinoro was to become a co-cathedral, and the cathedral Chapter was to be a Capitulum Concathedralis. Bertinoro which was established in 1360, has its own unique history. It was created after the destruction of Forlimpopoli by Cardinal Albornoz. There was to be only one diocesan Tribunal, in Forlì, and likewise one seminary, one College of Consultors, and one Priests' Council. The territory of the new diocese was to include the territory of the former diocese of Bertinoro.

== Bishops ==
=== Diocese of Forli ===
==== to 1200 ====
Mercurialis
...
Theodorus (452)
...

- Crescentius (attested 649)

...

- Vincentius (attested 679)

...

- Apollinaris (attested 861)

...
Bartholomaeus ? (887)
...
Rogerius (910)
...

- Paulus (attested 939)

...

- Ubertus (attested 962–998)

...
Rainerius
Theodoricus
...

- Faustus Andolini (attested 1001)

...

- Rodulfus (attested 1016)
- Oddo (attested 1021)

...

- Ubertus (attested 1043)
- Joannes (attested 1053, 1084)

...

- Petrus (attested 1117–1118)

...

- Drudo (attested 1149)

...

- Alexander (attested 1160–1189)

...

==== 1200 to 1500 ====
- Joannes (1192–1206)
- Albertus (attested 1206, 1220)
- Ricciardellus (attested 1225)
- Albertus (attested 1232)
- Henricus (1234–1249)
- Hieronymus (or Guilelmus)
- Richelmus (1253–1270)
- Rudolfus (1270–1280)
- Henricus (1280–1285)
- Rainaldus (1285–1302)
- Thaddeus (1302–1303)
- Ridolfus de Piatesi (attested 1303)
- Thomas (1318–1342)
- Joannes (1342–1348)
- Aimericus (1349–1351)
- Bartolomeo da Sanzetto, O.Min. (1351–1372)
- Artaud de Mélan (1372–1378)
- Paolo Naroli (1378–1384)
- Simon Pagani (1384–1391)
- Scarpetta de Ordelaffis (1391–1401)
- Giovanni Numai (1402–1411)
- Matteo Fiorilli (1412–1413)
- Albertus Benedicti Buoncristiani (1413–1417)
- Giovanni Strada (1417–1427)
- Giovanni Caffarelli (1427–1437)

[Fr. Guglielmo Bevilacqua, O.S.A. (1433–1436) Intrusus]

- Luigi Pirano (1437–1446)
- Mariano Farinata (1446–1449)
- Daniele di Arluno (1449–1463)
- Giacomo Paladini (1463–1470)
- Alessandro Numai (1470–1485)
- Tommaso Asti (1485–1512)

==== 1500 to 1800 ====
- Pietro Griffo (1512–1516)
- Bernardo Michelozzi (de' Medici) (1516–1519)
- Leonardo de' Medici (1519–1526 Resigned)

Cardinal Niccolò Ridolfi (1526–1528 Resigned) Administrator

- Bernardo Antonio de' Medici (1528–1551)
- Pietro Giovanni Aliotti (1551–1563 Resigned)
- Antonio Giannotti (1563–1578)
- Marcantonio del Giglio (1578–1580)
- Giovanni Francesco Mazza de' Canobbi (1580–1586 Resigned)
- Fulvio Teofili (1587–1594)
- Alessandro de Franceschi, O.P. (1594–1599 Resigned)
- Corrado Tartarini (1599–1602)
- Cesare Bartorelli (1602–1635)
- Giacomo Theodoli (Teodolo) (1635–1665 Resigned)
- Claudio Ciccolini (1666–1688)
- Giovanni Rasponi (1689–1714)
- Tommaso Torelli (1714–1760)
- Francesco Piazza (1760–1769)
- Nicola Bizarri (1769–1776 Resigned)
- Giuseppe de Vignoli (1776–1782)
- Mercuriale (Bartolomeo) Prati, O.S.B. (1784–1806)

==== since 1800 ====
- Andrea Bratti (1807–1835)
- Vincenzo Stanislao Tomba, B. (1836–1845)
- Gaetano Carletti (1845–1849)
- Antonio Magrini (1852–1852)
- Mariano Falcinelli Antoniacci, O.S.B. (1853–1857)
- Pietro Paolo Trucchi, C.M. (1857–1887)
- Domenico Svampa (1887–1894)
- Raimondo Jaffei (1895–1932)
- Giuseppe Rolla (1932–1950)
- Paolo Babini (1950–1976 Retired)
- Giovanni Proni (1976–1988 Retired)

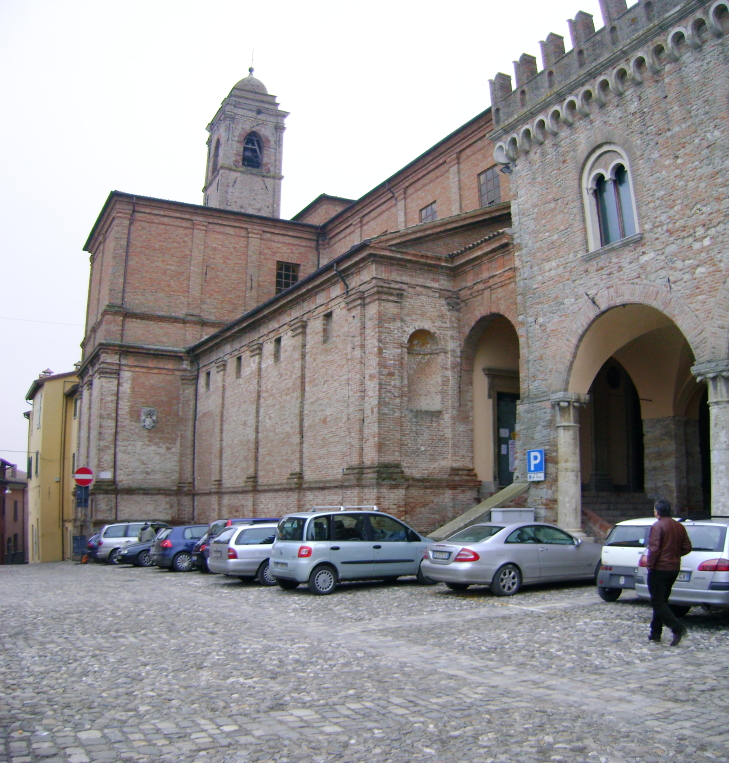
Co-cathedral in Bertinoro

=== Diocese of Forli-Bertinoro ===
United: 30 September 1986 with the Diocese of Bertinoro

- Vincenzo Zarri (1988–2005 Retired)
- Lino Pizzi (2005–2018 Retired)
- Livio Corazza (23 January 2018 – present)

== See also ==
- Timeline of Forlì
- Roman Catholic Diocese of Bertinoro

== Bibliography ==
=== Reference works ===
- Gams, Pius Bonifatius (1873). Series episcoporum Ecclesiae catholicae: quotquot innotuerunt a beato Petro apostolo. Ratisbon: Typis et Sumptibus Georgii Josephi Manz. pp. 697–698. (in Latin)
- Eubel, Conradus, ed. (1913). Hierarchia catholica. Vol. Tomus 1 (second ed.). Münster: Libreria Regensbergiana. (in Latin)
- Eubel, Conradus, ed. (1914). Hierarchia catholica. Vol. Tomus 2 (second ed.). Münster: Libreria Regensbergiana. (in Latin)
- Eubel, Conradus; Gulik, Guilelmus, eds. (1923). Hierarchia catholica. Vol. Tomus 3 (second ed.). Münster: Libreria Regensbergiana. (in Latin)
- Gauchat, Patritius (Patrice) (1935). Hierarchia catholica. Vol. Tomus IV (1592-1667). Münster: Libraria Regensbergiana. (in Latin)
- Ritzler, Remigius; Sefrin, Pirminus (1952). Hierarchia catholica medii et recentis aevi V (1667-1730). Patavii: Messagero di S. Antonio.
- Ritzler, Remigius; Sefrin, Pirminus (1958). Hierarchia catholica medii et recentis aevi. Vol. Tomus VI (1730-1799). Patavii: Messagero di S. Antonio. (in Latin)
- Ritzler, Remigius; Sefrin, Pirminus (1968). Hierarchia Catholica medii et recentioris aevi sive summorum pontificum, S. R. E. cardinalium, ecclesiarum antistitum series... A pontificatu Pii PP. VII (1800) usque ad pontificatum Gregorii PP. XVI (1846) (in Latin). Vol. VII. Monasterii: Libr. Regensburgiana.
- Remigius Ritzler; Pirminus Sefrin (1978). Hierarchia catholica Medii et recentioris aevi... A Pontificatu PII PP. IX (1846) usque ad Pontificatum Leonis PP. XIII (1903) (in Latin). Vol. VIII. Il Messaggero di S. Antonio.
- Pięta, Zenon (2002). Hierarchia catholica medii et recentioris aevi... A pontificatu Pii PP. X (1903) usque ad pontificatum Benedictii PP. XV (1922) (in Latin). Vol. IX. Padua: Messagero di San Antonio. ISBN 978-88-250-1000-8.

=== Studies ===
- Cappelletti, Giuseppei (1844). Le chiese d'Italia (in Italian). Vol. secondo. Venezia: Antonelli. pp. 369–435.
- Casali, Giovanni (1863). "Serie cronologica dei Vescovi di Forlì, investigata colla scorta di diversi Autori," Atti e memorie della R. Deputazione di Storia Patria per le Provincie di Romagna (in Italian). Vol. Anno secondo. Bologna: Romagnoli. 1863. pp. 91–158.
- Lanzoni, Francesco (1927). Le diocesi d'Italia dalle origini al principio del secolo VII (an. 604). Faenza: F. Lega, pp. 767–769. (in Italian)
- Marchesi, Giorgio Viviano (1726). Vitæ virorum illustrium Foroliuiensium (in Latin). Forli: ex typographia Pauli Syluæ.
- Marchesi, Sigismondo (1678). Supplemento istorico dell'antica citta' di Forli': in cui si descriue la prouincia di Romagna (in Italian). Forli: per Gioseffo Selua.
- Schwartz, Gerhard (1907). Die Besetzung der Bistümer Reichsitaliens unter den sächsischen und salischen Kaisern: mit den Listen der Bischöfe, 951-1122. Leipzig: B.G. Teubner. pp. 175–176. (in German)
- Ughelli, Ferdinando; Coleti, Niccolò (1717). Italia sacra sive De Episcopis Italiae, et insularum adjacentium (in Italian). Vol. Tomus secundus (2). Venice: apud Sebastianum Coleti. pp. 565–589.
