= Cia Ordelaffi =

14th-century Italian noblewoman warrior

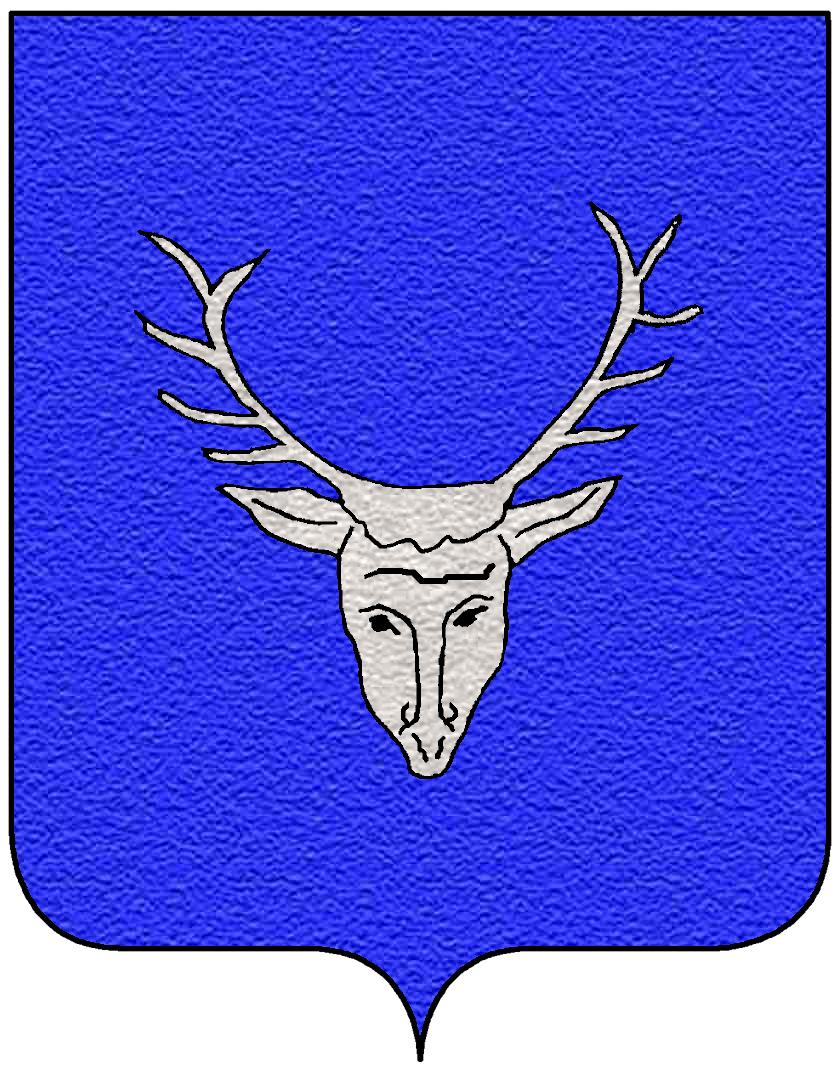
- Coat of arms
- Occupation: officer, memoirist

Cia Ordelaffi also known as Marzia Ubaldini (1317–1381) was a noblewoman and political figure in 14th-century Italy. She was born into the Ubaldini family and married into the Ordelaffi family, becoming a significant figure in the politics of the Romagna region during the tumultuous period of Guelph and Ghibelline conflicts.

== Biography ==
=== Early life ===
Cia Ordelaffi was born in 1317. She was the daughter of Giovanni di Tano da Castello, of the Ubaldini branch of Montaccianico, and Andrea Pagani, eldest daughter of the Romagna lord Maghinardo Pagani da Susinana. The Ubaldinis were a powerful Ghibelline family, and Cia's upbringing in such an environment deeply influenced her political and military inclinations. Little is known about her early life, but her marriage to Francesco II Ordelaffi, the lord of Forlì, placed her at the center of Italian political life.

=== Marriage and political influence ===
In 1334, Cia married Francesco II Ordelaffi, a key figure in the Ghibelline faction, which supported the Holy Roman Emperor against the Papal Guelphs. The marriage was likely arranged to strengthen alliances between powerful Ghibelline families. As the wife of Francesco II, Cia became the Lady of Forlì and was actively involved in the administration and defense of the city.

Cia's role extended beyond the typical duties of a noblewoman of her time. She was known for her intelligence, political acumen, and unwavering loyalty to her husband and the Ghibelline cause. Her influence was such that she was often involved in strategic decisions and negotiations with other Italian states.

=== The siege of Cesena ===
Cia Ordelaffi is perhaps best known for her defense of Cesena in 1357. During a Papal crusade against her husband, the Papal forces led by Cardinal Albornoz laid siege to Cesena, which was under the control of the Ordelaffi family. With Francesco II engaged elsewhere, Cia took command of the city's defenses.

Despite being outnumbered and facing a well-equipped Papal army, Cia orchestrated a vigorous defense of Cesena. Her leadership and determination during the siege became legendary, earning her respect and admiration from both her allies and enemies. Although the city eventually fell to the Papal forces, Cia's actions during the siege were celebrated as a symbol of courage and resistance.

On June 21, she surrendered to Albornoz; according to Villani, she asked the cardinal for a safe-conduct for the soldiers who had been under her orders, but nothing for herself. Albornoz had the woman and her relatives taken to a prison in Ancona, his main residence in Italy. After about two years of imprisonment, Cia Ubaldini was released in July 1359, when Forlì was also conquered; Francesco Ordelaffi renounced all claims on the city and was cleared of excommunication, obtaining the release of family members.

=== Later life and legacy ===
After the fall of Cesena, Cia continued to play a role in the political affairs of the region, although her influence waned as the Ghibelline cause weakened. Following the death of her husband, Francesco II, in 1374, Cia retired from public life. She spent her later years in relative obscurity.

Cia Ordelaffi passed away in 1381. She is remembered as one of the few women of her time who took on a military role, standing out as a formidable figure in the male-dominated world of 14th-century Italian politics.
