= Pino III Ordelaffi =

15th-century Italian lord and condottiero

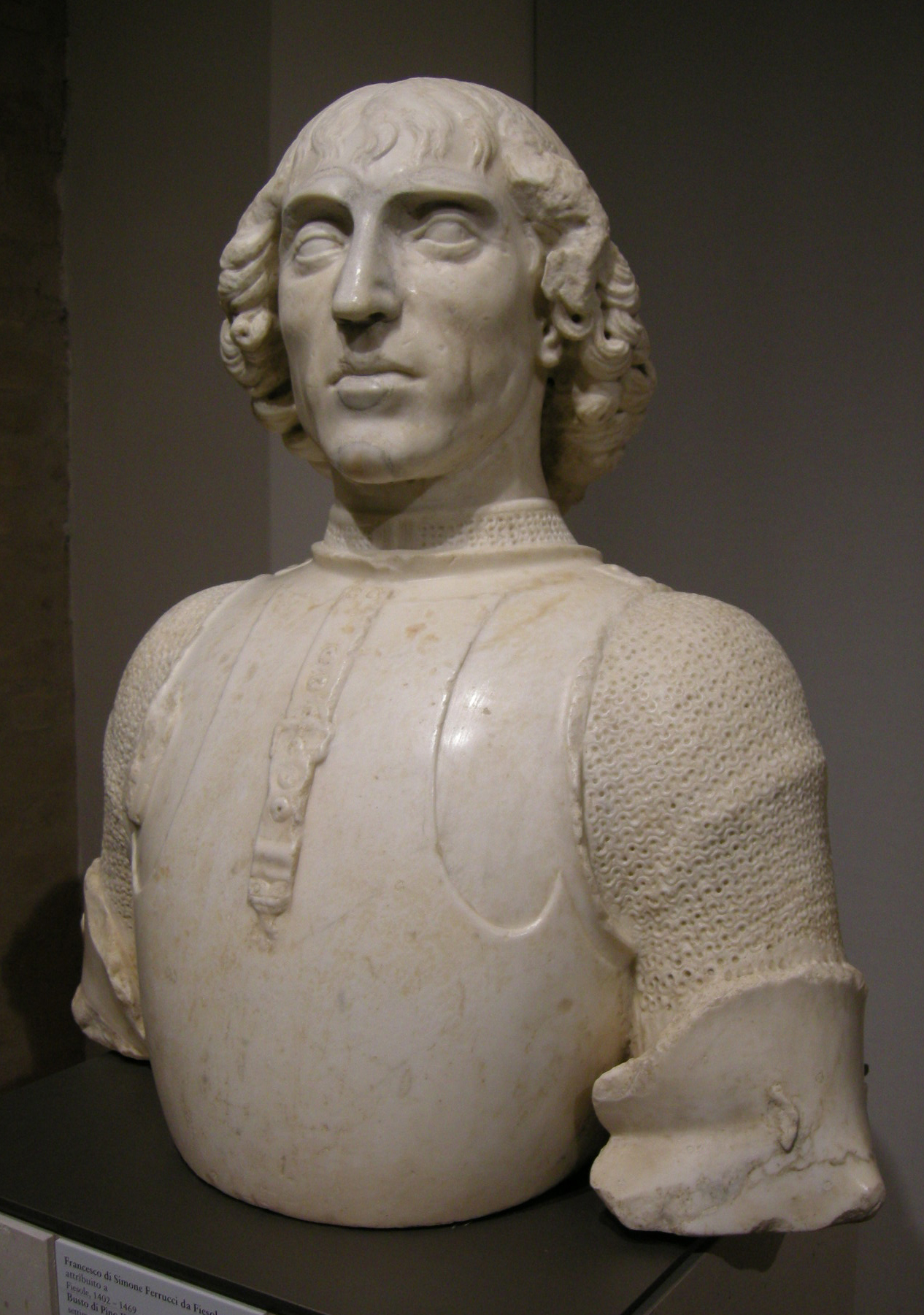
Bust of Pino III by Francesco di Simone Ferrucci, Musei di San Domenico

Pino III Ordelaffi (11 March 1436 – 10 February 1480) was an Italian condottiero and lord of Forlì. He was a member of the Ordelaffi family.

== Biography ==
The son of Antonio I Ordelaffi, he was the brother of Francesco IV Ordelaffi, lord of Forlì from 1448. In 1462, he married Barbara Manfredi, daughter of Astorre II, lord of Faenza.

In 1463, Pino fell ill: Francesco was suspected of having poisoned him, but he recovered. In 1466, as Francesco lay sick in turn, Pino seized the city and assumed the lordship of Forlì and Forlimpopoli. Soon after Barbara died, Astorre Manfredi suspected Pino of poisoning her out of jealousy. Therefore, Pino sought an alliance with Taddeo Manfredi, lord of Imola and rival of Astorre, to counter the latter's attempt to oust him with the help of the Pope. Pino married Taddeo's daughter Zaffira, but in 1473, he also had her poisoned. Pino also had his mother poisoned in 1467. He then married Lucrezia Pico della Mirandola, the sister of Giovanni Pico della Mirandola, who, a contemporary noted, was "always very careful with what she ate."

In 1467, he also took part in the Battle of Molinella, where he was wounded.

Pino was a patron of the arts, building numerous edifices in Forlì; he also completed the construction of the walls and strengthened the Castle. A monument commissioned by Pino to Francesco di Simone Ferrucci for his wife Barbara's tomb can be seen in the Abbey of San Mercuriale in Forlì.

He died in 1480, being briefly succeeded by his son Sinibaldo before the acquisition of the Forlivese lands by Girolamo Riario.

== Footnotes ==
Preceded by Francesco IV Ordelaffi	Lord of Forlì; 1466–1480	Succeeded by Sinibaldo II Ordelaffi
