= György Schöpflin =

Hungarian politician (1939–2021)

György Schöpflin MEP
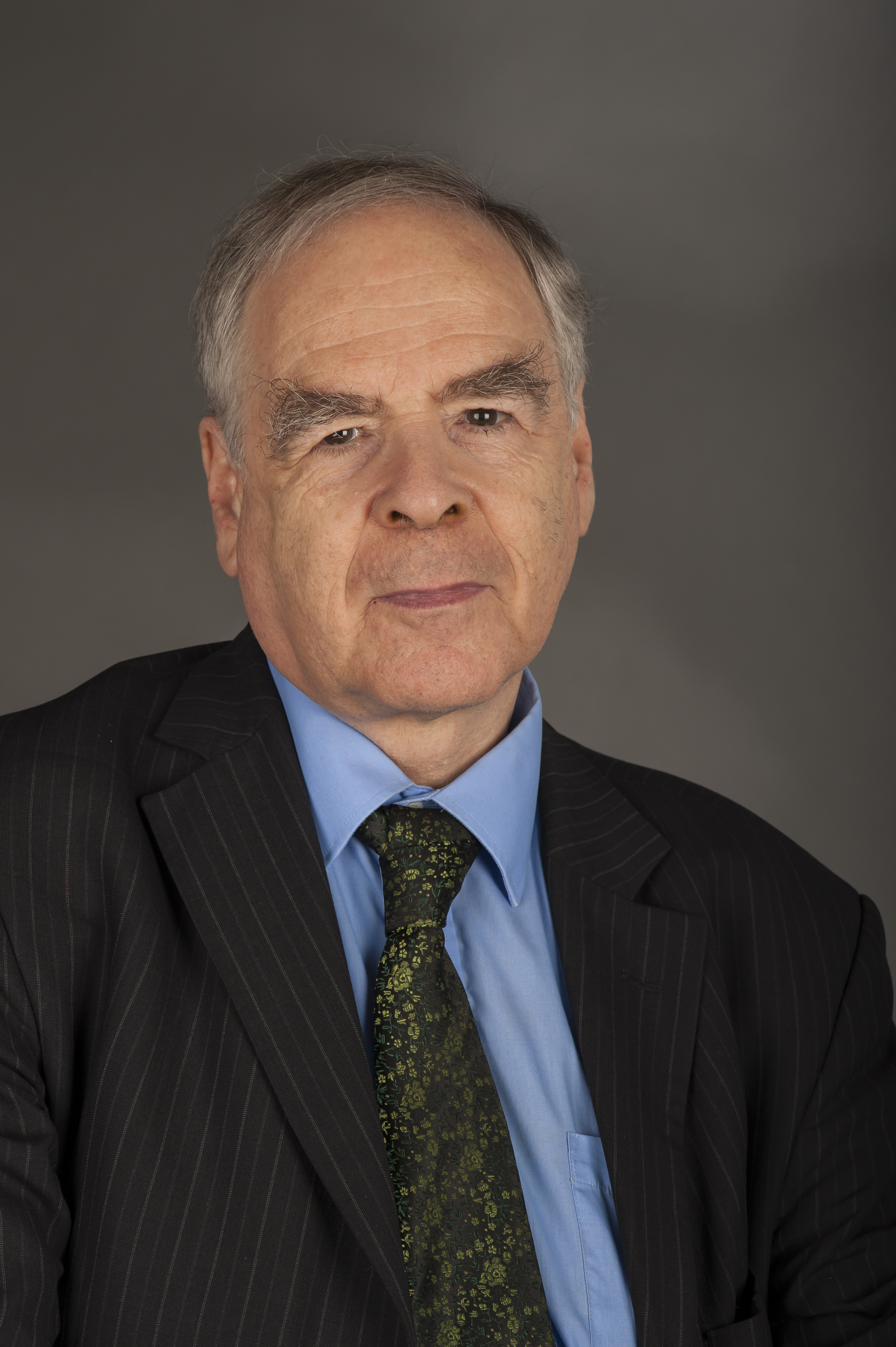

Member of the European Parliament
- In office 1 July 2004 – 1 July 2019
- Constituency: Hungary

Personal details
- Born: 24 November 1939 Budapest, Hungary
- Died: 19 November 2021
- Party: Hungarian; Fidesz; EU; European People's Party
- Spouse: Piret Peiker
- Children: Three
- Education: University of Glasgow; College of Europe

György Schöpflin (24 November 1939 – 19 November 2021), also known as George Schöpflin, was a Hungarian politician who served as Member of the European Parliament (MEP) from Hungary. He was a member of Fidesz, part of the European People's Party.

He was a member of the European Parliament's Committee on Foreign Affairs. Schöpflin was a substitute member of the Committee on Constitutional Affairs, and a member of the Reconciliation of European Histories Group.

Formerly Jean Monnet Professor of Politics at the School of Slavonic and East European Studies, University College London, he published extensively on questions of nationhood, identity and political power.

== Career ==
Schöpflin lived in the UK from 1950 to 2004, gaining his secondary education certificate in Scotland, followed by an MA in 1960 and an LLB in 1962 at the University of Glasgow, and a Certificate of Advanced European Studies from the College of Europe, Bruges, in 1963. He then worked at the Royal Institute of International Affairs in London from 1963–67, followed by a spell at the BBC until 1976.

He then returned to academia at the London School of Economics becoming a Lecturer in Eastern Europe and then jointly ran the famous seminar in communist politics and society. He later moved on to the School of Slavonic and East European Studies, University of London and later part of University College London, becoming Jean Monnet Professor of Politics in 1998.

In 2004, he was elected a Member of the European Parliament. He has not taught at UCL since. He taught at the Forlì Branch of the University of Bologna until 2011.

He was re-elected to the European Parliament in 2009 and 2014, and served as a full member on the Foreign Affairs Committee (AFET) and as a full member of the Committee on Constitutional Affairs (AFCO) 2014–2019, during which time he was EPP coordinator. He retired from the European Parliament in 2019.

He was Senior Research Fellow at the Institute of Advanced Studies Kőszeg. In March 2010, he was awarded a doctorate honoris causa by Tallinn University. In October 2013, he was awarded a doctorate honoris causa by Corvinus University, Budapest. In 2019 he was awarded a Ph.D. cum laude by Tallinn University. In August 2019 he was awarded the Commander's Cross with Star of the Hungarian Republic.

== Publications ==
Schöpflin published academic works in both English and Hungarian. When writing in English, he is known as George; in his Hungarian publications he is György.

- The Hungarians of Rumania (Minority Rights Group, London, 1978).
- Communist Political Systems: An Introduction (St Martin’s Press, 1982, with Stephen White and John Gardner)
- Politics in Eastern Europe 1945-1992 (Blackwell, 1993)
- Nations, Identity, Power (Hurst, 2000)
- Myths and Nationhood (Hurst, 1997, co-edited with Geoffrey Hosking)
- State Building in the Balkans: Dilemmas on the Eve of the 21st Century (Longo, 1998, co-edited with Stefano Bianchini)
- Az identitás dilemmái (Attraktor, 2004).
- "The Dilemmas of Identity" (Tallinn University Press, 2010).
- "Politics, Illusions, Fallacies" (Tallinn University Press, 2012).
- 'The European Polis' (Ludovika, Budapest, 2021).
