= Crusade against Francesco Ordelaffi =

The crusade against Francesco Ordelaffi (1356–1359) was an international military campaign to restore the temporal power of the Holy See over part of the Romagna. Resistance was led by Francesco II Ordelaffi, lord of Forlì and Cesena. The crusaders were initially successful in detaching Ordelaffi's allies. The intervention of mercenaries on Ordelaffi's side changed the nature of the war. Papal authority was eventually reimposed with the help of Hungarian troops.

== Background ==
In 1353, Innocent VI, then ruling from Avignon, sent Cardinal Gil de Albornoz to Italy to restore papal authority in the Papal States. He met the greatest resistance from Ordelaffi and Manfredi. In October 1354, he had them declared heretics "on the grounds of contumacy".

On 17 January 1356, Pope Innocent VI pronounced a crusade against Ordelaffi and his allies, Giovanni Manfredi, lord of Faenza, and his brother Guglielmo Manfredi. He accused them of unlawfully occupying Castrocaro, Meldola and Bertinoro and governing tyrannically. The crusade was led by Albornoz, who in February ordered it preached in the archdiocese of Ravenna and the patriarchates of Grado and Aquileia.

Ordelaffi's allies at the start of the crusade were the Lordship of Milan under Bernabò Visconti and the Republic of Venice.

== Campaign ==
The crusade achieved early successes with troops supplied by the House of Anjou. On 1 July, Innocent VI asked King Louis I of Hungary to send troops and to permit the Hungarian church to send raise troops. On 17 July, an agreement was reached. Louis was appointed standard-bearer of the Church (4 August) and granted a three-year tenth to cover his expenses (11 August). He was to provide troops to Albornoz upon request, and in exchange, the pope sanctioned his intervention in the civil war in the Serbian Empire as a crusade.

Cia Ubaldini defending Cesena (19th-century illustration)

The Manfredi changed sides before the end of the year. In response, Bernabò Visconti secretly hired the Great Company of German mercenaries under Conrad of Landau to assist Ordelaffi. In early 1357, Hungarian troops arrived. In April, Ordelaffi sent his wife, Cia Ubaldini, to defend Cesena, which she had previously defended against Albornoz in 1353. In May, anticipating the arrival of the Germans, Albornoz requested further Hungarian reinforcements. He also detached the Da Polenta from their alliance with Ordelaffi and laid siege to Cesena, which capitulated on 21 June and Bertinoro on 23 June.

The Germans arrived in the Romagna on 18 June 1357. After their initial attempt to enter Tuscany failed, they camped at Forlì on 6 July. During his preaching that month, Albornoz extended the crusade to cover the mercenaries, on the grounds that they were guilty of "aiding heretics" (fautoria heresiae). This was the first time a crusade was declared against mercenaries. Albornoz also reduced the period of service required to receive the crusade indulgence. In Florence, the bishop of Narni declared in a sermon that the indulgence was available to anyone who paid one twelfth of the salary of a man-at-arms for six months. On 26 July, after negotiations with the republic of Florence, the bishop announced that all Florentines who confessed their sins within three months would receive the indulgence. In exchange, the republic was to supply the crusade with a set number of troops for a set time. This cost the republic 100,000 florins.

The Florentine contingent fought with the German mercenaries near Forlì on 26–27 July. In August, however, Albornoz neutralised the mercenaries with bribes. This policy was opposed by Florence. In the autumn, Hungary sent troops. Albornoz was replaced as commander by Abbot Androin de la Roche. In December, Innocent thanked King Louis for having sent "a sizeable body of men-at-arms".

After a year with few successes, Albornoz returned to replace Androin in the autumn of 1358. In February 1359, he launched a siege of Forlì. He took Castrocaro, Predappio, Fiumana, Oriolo and Rocca d'Elmici. On 4 July, Ordelaffi surrendered Forlì, and the crusade came to a close.

== Bibliography ==
- Housley, Norman (1982). "The Mercenary Companies, the Papacy, and the Crusades, 1356–1378". Traditio. 38: 253–280. doi:10.1017/S0362152900009454.
- Housley, Norman (1984). "King Louis the Great of Hungary and the Crusades, 1342–1382". The Slavonic and East European Review. 62 (2): 192–208. JSTOR 4208851.
- Housley, Norman (1986). The Avignon Papacy and the Crusades, 1305–1378. Clarendon Press.
- Housley, Norman (1992). The Later Crusades, 1274–1580: From Lyons to Alcazar. Oxford University Press.
- Lock, Peter (2006). The Routledge Companion to the Crusades. Routledge.
- Mascanzoni, Leardo (2016). "The Italian "Crusade" against Francesco Ordelaffi (1356–1359) Lord of Forlì and How It Is Perceveid in the Chronicles". Academia.edu. Paper read at Diversity of Crusading, Ninth Quadriennial Conference of the SSCLE, Odense, 27 June – 1 July 2016.
- Mascanzoni, Leardo (2017). La crociata contro Francesco II Ordelaffi (1356–1359) nello specchio della storiografia: Exurgant Insuper Christi Milites. Pàtron Editore.
- Mascanzoni, Leardo (2024). "Crusades in Northern Italy in the Fourteenth Century". In Mike Carr; Nikolaos G. Chrissis; Gianluca Raccagni (eds.). Crusading Against Christians in the Middle Ages. Palgrave Macmillan. pp. 115–136.
- Pirani, Francesco (2020). "Ubaldini, Cia". Dizionario Biografico degli Italiani (in Italian). Vol. 97: Trivulzio–Valeri. Rome: Istituto dell'Enciclopedia Italiana. ISBN 978-88-12-00032-6.
- Poloni, Alma (2013). "Ordelaffi, Francesco di Sinibaldo". Dizionario Biografico degli Italiani (in Italian). Vol. 79: Nursio–Ottolini Visconti. Rome: Istituto dell'Enciclopedia Italiana. ISBN 978-88-12-00032-6.
