= Francesco III =

Francesco III may refer to:

- Francesco III Ordelaffi (c. 1357–1405)
- Francesco III Gonzaga, Duke of Mantua (1533–1550)
- Francesco III d'Este, Duke of Modena (1698–1780)
