= Francesco IV =

Francesco IV may refer to:

- Francesco IV Ordelaffi (1435–1466)
- Francesco IV Gonzaga, Duke of Mantua (1586–1612)
- Francesco IV d'Este (1779–1846)
