= Antonio I (disambiguation) =

António, Prior of Crato (1531–1595) would have been King Antonio I of Portugal.

Antonio I may also refer to:

- Antonio I della Scala (1362–1388), Lord of Verona (ruled 1371–1387)
- Antonio I Acciaioli (died 1435), Duke of Athens
- Antonio I Ordelaffi (1390–1448), Lord of Forlì
- António I of Kongo (died 1665), mwenekongo of the Kingdom of Kongo
- Antonio I, Prince of Monaco (1661–1731), sovereign Prince of Monaco
- Orélie-Antoine de Tounens (1825–1878), Antonio I of Araucanía and Patagonia
