= Francesco III Ordelaffi =

Italian condottiero

Francesco III Ordelaffi (c. 1357 – September 8, 1405), also known as Cecco III, was an Italian condottiero and lord of Forlì. A member of the Ordelaffi family, he was brother to Pino I.

Together with Pino, he was a protagonist in the reconquest of Forlì by his uncle Sinibaldo; the two imprisoned him and assumed jointly the seigniory on December 13, 1385. In the 1390s he allied with Antonio da Montefeltro against Carlo, Andrea and Pandolfo Malatesta, and helped Azzo X d'Este in his failed attempt to gain Ferrara from Niccolò III.

In 1402 succeeded Pino in the lordship of Forlì, receiving the title of Papal vicar by Boniface IX. His last years of rule were marked by cruelties and political suppression, and, when, being severely ill, in 1405 he attempted to ratify the succession for his son Antonio, the population rose and killed him. The city was therefore a Republic for several years.

== Marriage ==
Married to Caterina Gonzaga, daughter of Guido II Gonzaga of Novellara. Issue:

- Taddea Ordelaffi
- Lucrezia Ordelaffi, married to Andrea Malatesta

Cecco also had an illegitimate son, Antonio

== Sources ==
- Spada, Sergio (2011). Gli Ordelaffi. Signori di Forlì e Cesena. Il Ponte Vecchio.

Preceded by Pino I Ordelaffi	Lord of Forlì; 1402–1405	Vacant Republican rule Title next held by Giorgio Ordelaffi
