= Antonio Ordelaffi =

Antonio Ordelaffi is the name of:

- Antonio I Ordelaffi (1390–1448), lord of Forlì
- Antonio II Ordelaffi (1460–1504), see Cesare Borgia
