= Giovanni Ordelaffi =

Nobleman (born 1355)

Giovanni Ordelaffi (1355–1399) was a member of the noble family of Ordelaffi, the Lords of Forlì, in Italy, in the 14th and in the 15th centuries.

Born in Forlì, he was a famous condottiero.

His most famous battle was the Battle of Castagnaro (1387), in which he fought for the city of Verona against the troops of John Hawkwood, for Padua, but was defeated in battle.

He was poisoned by Pino I Ordelaffi.

== Bibliography ==
- Pecci, G. (1974). Gli Ordelaffi. Faenza: Fratelli Lega Editori.
