= Giorgio Ordelaffi =

Italian noble

Giorgio Ordelaffi (died 1423) was lord of Forlì and Papal vicar in Romagna (northern Italy). He was a member of the Ordelaffi family.

The son of Teobaldo Ordelaffi, he married Lucrezia Alidosi of the Alidosi family. She was the daughter of Ludovico Alidosi, Lord of Imola. Ordelaffi kept the seigniory of Forlì from 1411 until his death, moving his residence to the current Palazzo Comunale.

Just before his death, when his son Teobaldo II Ordelaffi was still young, he offered to Filippo Maria Visconti of Milan the occasion to invade Romagna in 1423, initiating the 30-year long Wars in Lombardy.

== Issue ==
- Teobaldo (1413-1425), his father's successor in the seigniory from 1423. Died of plague.
- A daughter (1418-1425).

Vacant Republican rule Title next held by Francesco III Ordelaffi	Lord of Forlì; 1411–1422	Succeeded by Teobaldo II Ordelaffi
