= Mattarelli =

'Mattarelli is a surname. Notable people with the surname include:

- Ennio Mattarelli (1928–2026), Italian sport shooter
- Gino Mattarelli (1921–1986), Italian politician
