= Sinibaldo II Ordelaffi =

Sinibaldo II Ordelaffi (1467– 14 July 1480 Forlì) was the lord of Forlì in 1480, inheriting it from his father Pino III Ordelaffi. After his death the Ordelaffi lost the control of the city, who was acquired by Pope Sixtus IV's nephew Girolamo Riario. Sinibaldo's relative Francesco V Ordelaffi shortly claimed the lordship, but in vain.

== Sources ==
- G. Pecci, Gli Ordelaffi, Fratelli Lega Editori, Faenza 1974.

Preceded by Pino III Ordelaffi	Lord of Forlì; 1480	Succeeded by Girolamo Riario
