= Sinibaldo I Ordelaffi =

Sinibaldo I Ordelaffi (1336 – October 28, 1386) was a lord of Forlì, the son of Francesco II Ordelaffi.

In 1376, with the support of the Ghibelline party, he took advantage of a revolt of Forlì against the Papal authority, to rebuild the seigniory established by his ancestor Francesco I in 1315. Pope Urban VI named him Papal vicar of Forlimpopoli and Castrocaro Terme from 1379.

In 1382, with the help of Alberico da Barbiano, he pushed back the assault of Louis of Anjou. Sinibaldo died in 1386, probably poisoned. His nephew Pino, who had imprisoned him in the castle of Ravaldino the previous year, succeeded him.

Vacant To the Papal States Title last held by Francesco II Ordelaffi	Lord of Forlì; 1376–1386	Succeeded by Pino I Ordelaffi
