= Barbara Manfredi =

Barbara Manfredi (1444–1466) was the wife of Pino III Ordelaffi, lord of Forlì (Italy).

== Biography ==
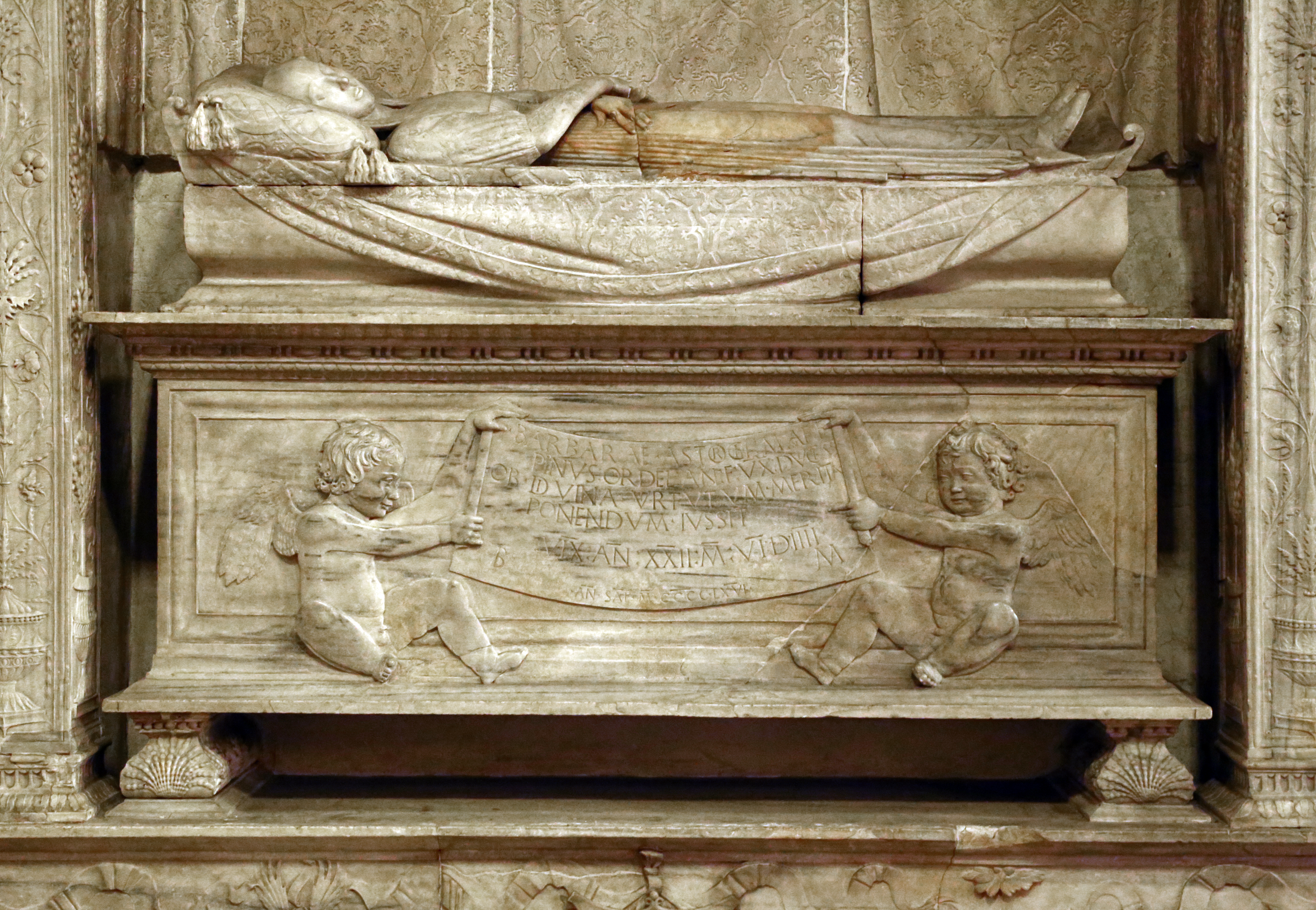
Francesco di simone ferrucci, monumento di barbara manfredi, 1466-68a

She was born in Faenza, current Emilia-Romagna, to Astorre II Manfredi, seignior of that city. At the age of seven, she was betrothed to the powerful Pino III Ordelaffi, who married her in 1462.

The following year, Pino became ill. His brother Francesco (Cecco) was suspected of poisoning him, but the Forlivese lord survived. Cecco was in the end assassinated, and Pino could be the sole lord of the city, maintaining that position thanks to the support of Venice.

However, when Barbara suddenly died, Pino was accused by Astorre of poisoning her. The magnificent sepulchre that her husband commissioned for her (now in the Abbey of San Mercuriale in Forlì) was seen as proof of his guilty conscience. It was the first tomb in Romagna designed on Renaissance principles.

Pino would also be accused of later poisoning his second wife Zaffira Manfredi.
