= San Giacomo Apostolo, Forlì =

Church building in Forlì, Italy

Coordinates: 44°13′16″N 12°02′10″E

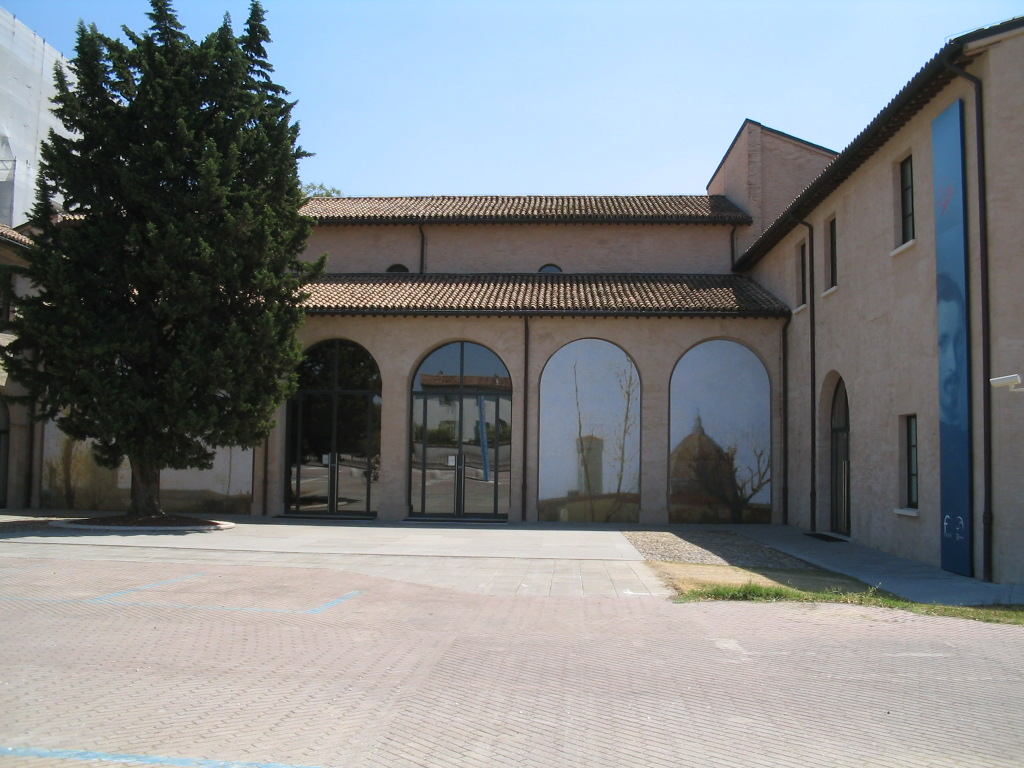
The Dominican Church of San Giacomo Apostolo in Forlì. Entrance at the museum.

The Dominican Church of San Giacomo Apostolo is a late medieval church in Forlì, Italy.

Built during the 13th century in the southern part of the town, it hosted friars of the Dominican Order, hence it was better known as Church of San Domenico.

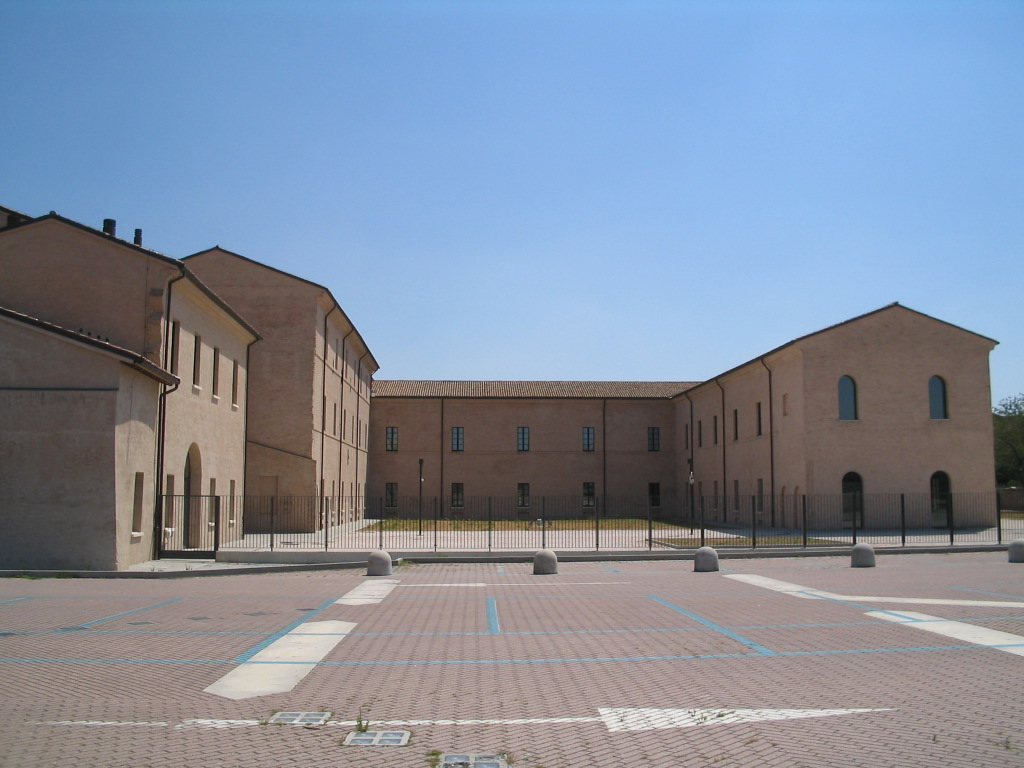
The Dominican Church of San Giacomo Apostolo in Forlì.

In the first half of the 16th century, the two cloisters were restored and the monastery was enlarged.

Between 1715 and 1719, the church interior was restored according to the late Baroque canons.

With the last and final abolishment of the convent in 1867 by Napoleon, the church was expoliated while the monastery was used as a shed for military vehicles. Then it was subject to a hard and progressive deterioration which, in 1978, brought to the collapse of the roof and the church demolition.

The building of San Domenico is currently undergoing a vast recovery project and a part of it has become the seat of a museum.
