= Francesco IV Ordelaffi =

- Born: 1435
- Died: 1466
- Parents: Antonio I Ordelaffi (father); Caterina Rangoni (mother)
- Relatives: Pino III Ordelaffi (brother) Ugo Rangoni (uncle)
- Family: Ordelaffi

Francesco IV Ordelaffi (1435–1466), also known as Cecco IV, was lord of Forlì from 1448 until his death. He was a member of the Ordelaffi family.

The son of Antonio I Ordelaffi, he succeeded him at Forlì in 1448, under the regency of his mother Caterina Rangoni and, after her death the following year, of her brother Ugo Rangoni. The latter was expelled in 1454 and thenceforth Francesco reigned jointly with his brother Pino III Ordelaffi until his death.

Preceded by Antonio I Ordelaffi	Lord of Forlì; 1448–1466	Succeeded by Pino III Ordelaffi
