= Pino I Ordelaffi =

Pino I (or II) Ordelaffi (c. 1356 – July 1402) was an Italian condottiero and lord of Forlì from 1386 until his death. A member of the Ordelaffi family, he was the son of Giovanni Ordelaffi and Tebalda Malatesta. He was also Papal vicar of Forlimpopoli, Castrocaro Terme and Sarsina.

After imprisoning his uncle Sinibaldo, he assumed the rule of Forlì in 1386. In 1399 he poisoned his cousin Giovanni Ordelaffi.

He died by apoplexy. His brother Cecco III succeeded him in the rule of Forlì.

Preceded by Sinibaldo I Ordelaffi	Lord of Forlì; 1385–1402	Succeeded by Francesco III Ordelaffi
