= San Mercuriale Abbey =

Religious building in Forlì, Italy

Coordinates: 44°13′21.96″N 12°2′31.37″E

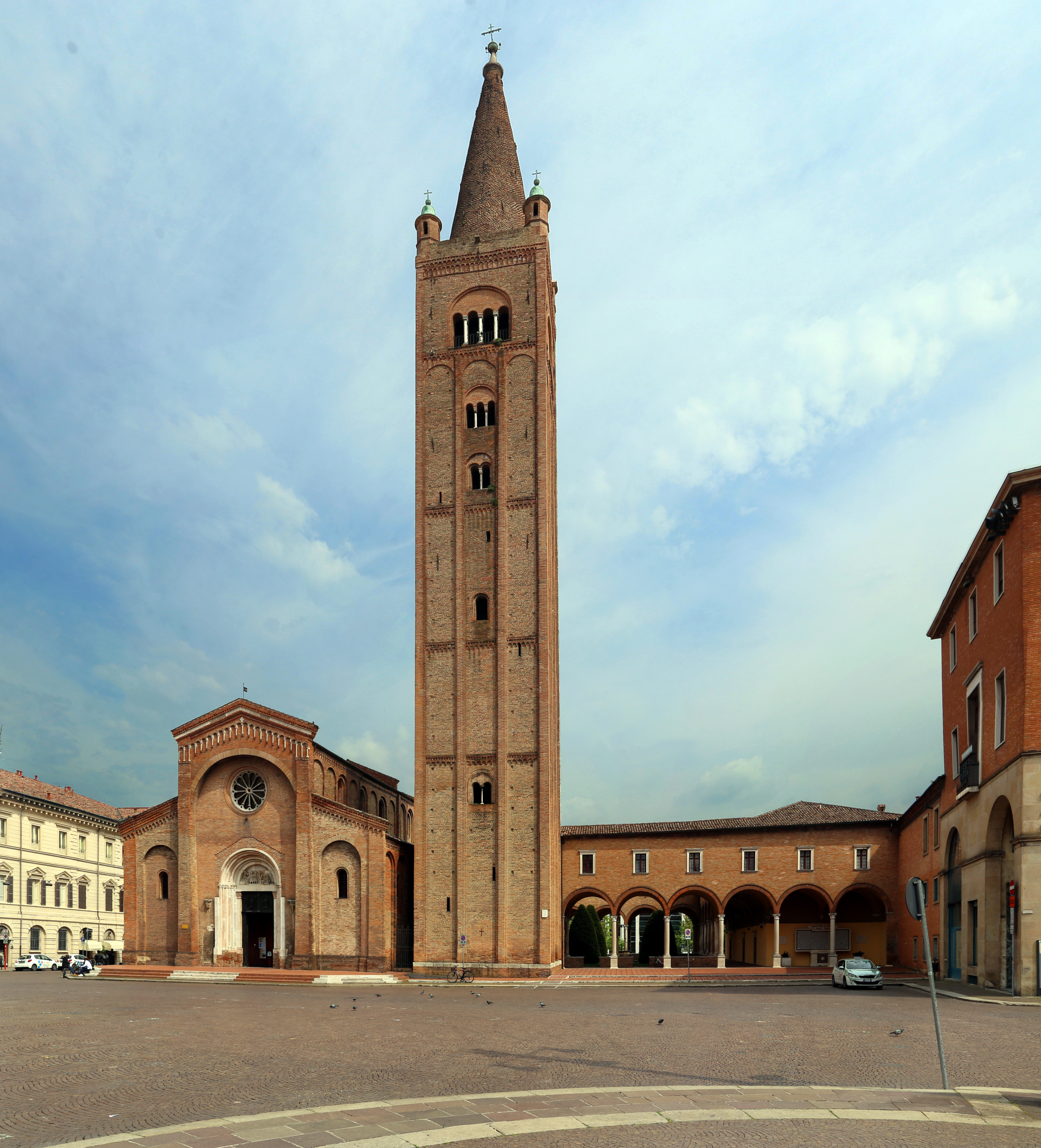

Religion
- Affiliation: Roman Catholic
- Province: Forlì-Cesena
- Region: Emilia-Romagna
- Patron: Saint Mercurialis

Location
- Country: Italy
- Interactive map of San Mercuriale Abbey

San Mercuriale Abbey (Abbazia di San Mercuriale) is a minor basilica and former abbey church in Forlì, Emilia-Romagna, Italy. It stands in Piazza Aurelio Saffi, the city's principal square, and is one of the principal examples of Romanesque architecture in the region. The church was granted the title of minor basilica by Pope John XXIII on 16 January 1959.

== History and architecture ==
A church dedicated to Saint Stephen stood on the site before the present building; the existing archaeological and historical evidence associates the earlier church with the early medieval period, and the Comune di Forlì dates the pieve to the 6th century. A Benedictine monastery was established at the site by the 9th century, and the community was subsequently incorporated into the Vallumbrosan Order in the late 12th century.

The complex was severely damaged in the great fire that devastated much of Forlì in 1173. The present church was rebuilt in the following years in Lombard-Romanesque style, with construction generally dated to 1176–1181. The bell tower was erected as part of the same rebuilding campaign; the first stone was laid in 1181, and it is traditionally attributed to the master builder Magister Aliotto. The tower is over 70 metres high and is one of the dominant features of the Forlì skyline.

The abbey originally stood outside the Roman settlement of Forlì. It was subsequently incorporated into the medieval urban area as the city's walls were expanded. The complex includes a cloister associated with the Vallumbrosan community, with a rectangular plan and a colonnade surrounding a central well.

The medieval apse was substantially altered after its collapse in 1505, which also destroyed the crypt and buried the relics of Saint Mercurialis. A new presbytery and rectangular apse were constructed during the 16th century; the work was enlarged from 1575 onwards. The new arrangement accommodated the wooden choir by Alessandro Begni of Bergamo, made between 1532 and 1535.

The church underwent further alterations in the 16th and 17th centuries, including modifications to the façade. Major restoration campaigns in the early 20th century sought to restore the building's Romanesque character.

The façade and bell tower are built predominantly of brick. The façade is divided into three sections and decorated with blind arches. Above the main portal is a Romanesque sculptural lunette depicting the Dream and Adoration of the Magi, attributed to the Master of the Months of Ferrara. The relief dates from the early 13th century and has been described as one of the earliest sculpted representations of the Nativity of Jesus.

== Works of art ==
The interior is divided into three naves and contains numerous works of art.

The most notable monuments include the Sepulchre of Barbara Manfredi, a marble funerary monument made by Francesco di Simone Ferrucci of Fiesole. Barbara Manfredi, the first wife of Pino III Ordelaffi, died in 1466. The monument was originally located in the church of San Biagio in San Girolamo and was transferred to San Mercuriale after the former church was severely damaged during the Second World War. It was reconstructed in the basilica in 1947.

The Ferri Chapel is located in the left aisle. Its marble entrance arch is attributed to Jacopo Bianchi of Ulcinj (Dulcigno), and the chapel contains the Immaculate Conception by Marco Palmezzano.

Works by Marco Palmezzano include the Madonna Enthroned with Saints John the Evangelist and Catherine of Alexandria, the Crucifix with St John Gualbertus and Mary Magdalene, and the Madonna with Saints Anselm, Augustine and Stephen.

The Mercuriali Chapel, dedicated to Saint Mercurialis, contains stucco and fresco decoration and works by artists including Domenico Passignano, Ludovico Cigoli, Baldassarre Carrari, Santi di Tito and Francesco Menzocchi. The chapel was promoted by the physician Girolamo Mercuriale and his son Massimiliano and was completed in 1606.

The church also contains the Chapel of the Blessed Sacrament and a number of other paintings and sculptures from the 15th to the 17th centuries.
