= Teobaldo II Ordelaffi =

Teobaldo II Ordelaffi (also known as Tebaldo, 1413–1425) was briefly lord of Forlì from 1422 to 1424. He was the son of Giorgio Ordelaffi.

Giorgio has named Filippo Maria Visconti of Milan as his trustee, but Teobaldo's mother Lucrezia degli Alidosi, appointed herself as regent. Spurred by Visconti, the Forliveses rebelled and called in the Milanese condottiero Agnolo della Pergola. Florence reacted and, after some initial setbacks, it was joined by Venice in 1425 thanks to the efforts of the Count of Carmagnola. The war moved to Lombardy, and Visconti ceded Forlì and Imola to Pope Martin V. The Ordelaffi would return in Forlì in 1433 with Antonio I.

== See also ==
- Wars in Lombardy

Preceded by Giorgio Ordelaffi	Lord of Forlì; 1422-1424	Vacant To the Duchy of Milan Title next held by Antonio I Ordelaffi
