= Antonio I Ordelaffi =

Italian noble

Antonio I Ordelaffi (c. 1390 – 4 August 1448) was lord of Forlì from 1433 to 1436 and again from 1438 to 1448. He was a member of the noble family of Ordelaffi.

The son of Francesco III Ordelaffi (best known as Cecco III or II), at the latter's death (1405) he was first imprisoned and then exiled to Venice by the Papal legate Baldassarre Cossa. In 1411 he returned to Forlì as co-lord with his cousin Giorgio, but he was again imprisoned in Imola where he remained until 1424, when he was freed by the Visconti of Milan. Giorgio had died in 1422, but Forlì was returned to the Papal States.

Eleven years later a popular revolt ousted the Papal governor, and Antonio could take possession of Forlì. Allied with the Visconti then in war against Pope Eugene IV, he managed to gain Forlimpopoli and other castles, but the peace between Rome and Milan stripped him off of all of them. In 1436 he was also forced to cede Forlì to Francesco Sforza, and went to exile in Ferrara. Two years later he regained the seigniory and maintained it despite the attacks of Papal-Visconti condottieri like Niccolò Piccinino and Sigismondo Pandolfo Malatesta. In 1447 he was recognized papal vicar of Forlì.

He married Caterina Rangoni of Spilamberto. After his death during a plague, she held the lordship with her brother Ugo Rangoni (1449–1454).

== Sources ==
- Rendina, Claudio (1985). I capitani di ventura. Rome: Newton Compton.

Vacant To the Papal States Title last held by Teobaldo II Ordelaffi	Lord of Forlì; 1433–1436	Vacant To the Papal States
Vacant To the Papal States	Lord of Forlì; 1436–1448	Succeeded by Francesco IV Ordelaffi
