= Piazza Saffi =

Square in Forlì, Italy

Coordinates: 44°13′21″N 12°02′28″E

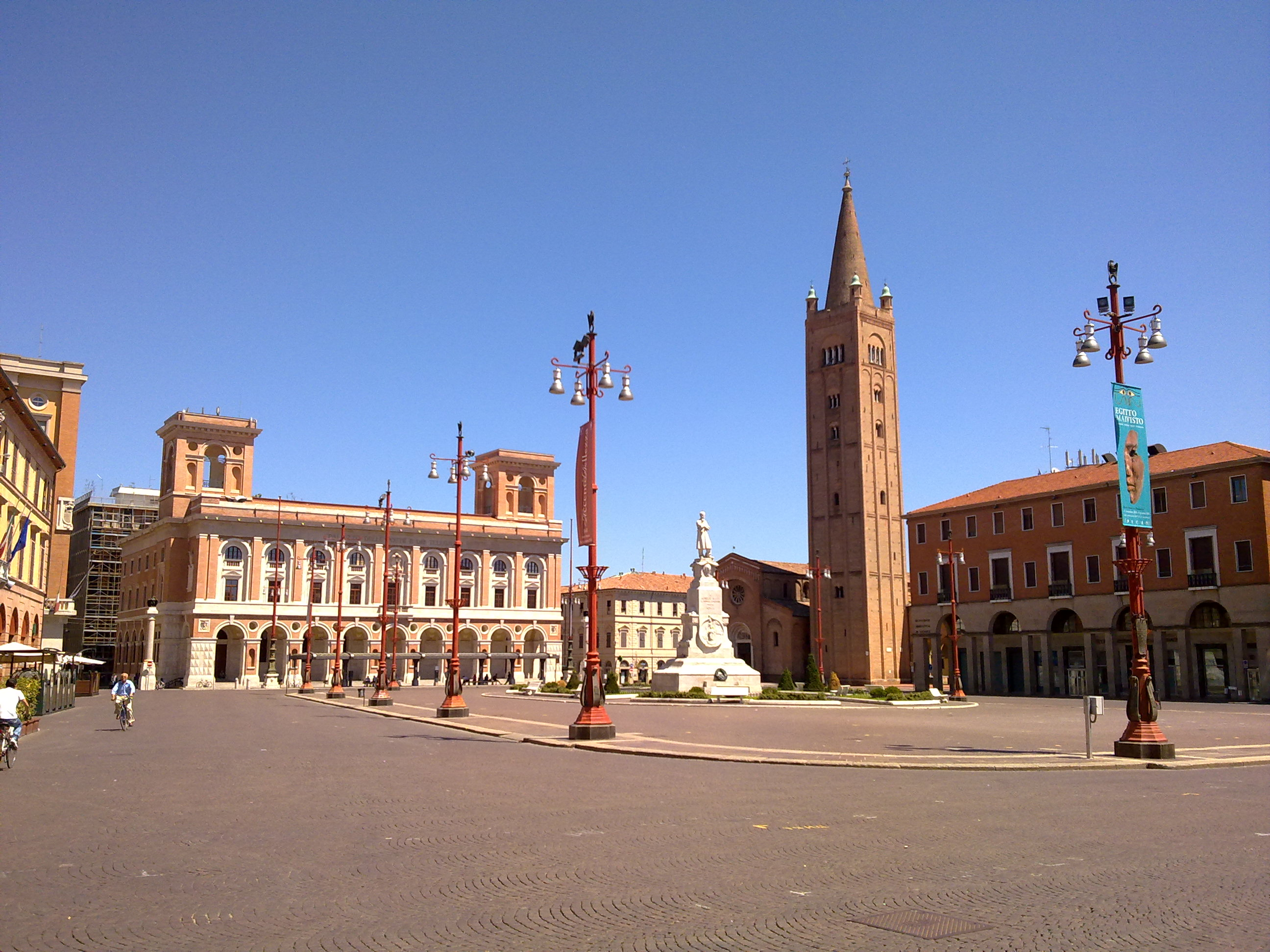
Piazza Aurelio Saffi in Forlì

Piazza Aurelio Saffi is a town square located at the heart of Forlì, Italy, and is surrounded by several of the city's most notable landmarks.

It has a trapezoidal shape and measures approximately 128 metres (420 ft) in length and 87 metres (285 ft) in width.

At the center of the square stands the statue of Aurelio Saffi, surrounded by some of the town's most distinguished and historic buildings. On the southern side stands the Abbey of San Mercuriale, one of Forlì's most iconic religious structures. Adjacent to the Abbey is the Palazzo Paulucci de Calboli, built in the early 18th century.

The eastern side features the Palazzo delle Poste (Post Building), constructed in the early 1930s.

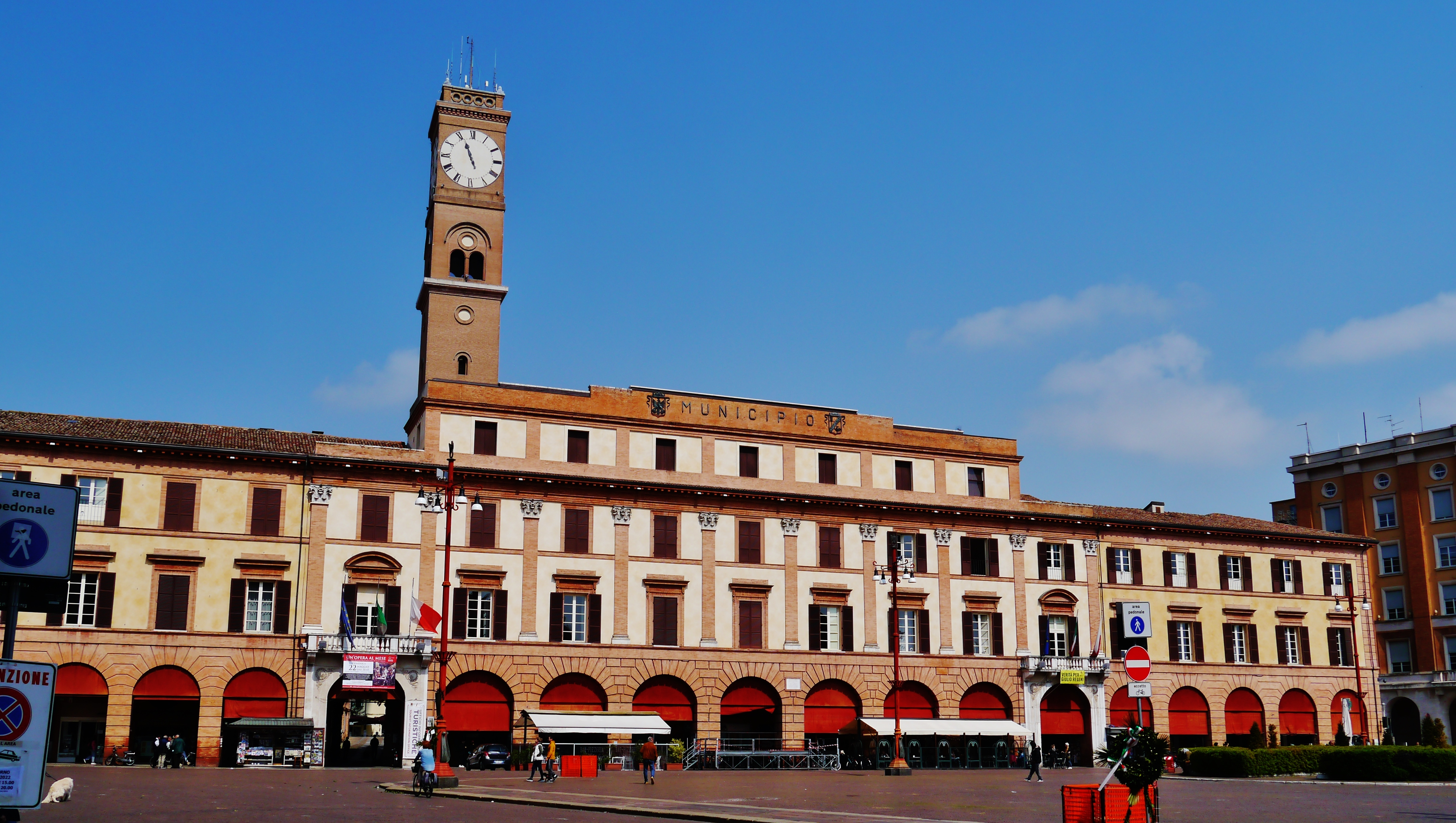
Palazzo Comunale

The Palazzo Comunale, which occupies the northern side, dates back to the year 1000 and currently serves as the Town Hall.

The western side, at the corner with Corso Diaz, is home to the Palazzo del Podestà, a Gothic-style building erected in 1460. To its right stands the Palazzo Albertini, an elegant 15th-century building in Venetian style.
