= Francesco II Ordelaffi =

14th-century Italian nobleman

Francesco II Ordelaffi (c. 1300–1374), also known as Cecco II, was a lord of Forlì, the son of Sinibaldo Ordelaffi (died 1337, brother of Scarpetta and Francesco) and Orestina Calboli, and the grandson of Teobaldo I Ordelaffi.

Initially, he ruled the city with his uncle Francesco, but in 1332, the two were ousted by a Papal Army, remaining in control of Forlimpopoli only. The following year, however, he became the Ghibelline leader in Romagna, receiving the seigniories of Cesena and Bertinoro and establishing a firm rule in Forlì.

In 1337, Francesco imprisoned the Archbishop of Ravenna and was excommunicated by Pope Benedict XIII: however, the struggle ended with the Ordelaffi victorious, since the Pope named him papal vicar of Forlì, Cesena and Forlimpopoli, in exchange for an annual payment. The excommunication was later renewed when he sided with Emperor Louis IV of Bavaria in order to avoid the tribute, being named imperial vicar. Around 1347, he hosted Giovanni Boccaccio in Forlì.

In 1350 Francesco conquered Bertinoro, Meldola, Fontanafredda and Ghiaggiolo, but had to face the opposition of the strong Papal general Gil de Albornoz, supported by the Malatesta of Rimini, as well as another excommunication. Despite the strong resistance of his wife Cia degli Ubaldini and his son Ludovico, Cesena fell on 21 June, soon followed by Bertinoro. Francesco and Forlì fell on 4 July 1359, and he was to content himself with the title of vicar of Forlimpopoli and Castrocaro thenceforth. Later, he fought for the Lord of Milan, Bernabò Visconti, against the Papal armies and tried unsuccessfully to reconquer Forlì. He died in Venice in 1374.

His son Sinibaldo was later lord of Forlì.

== See also ==
- Crusade against Francesco Ordelaffi

Vacant To the Papal States Title last held by Francesco I Ordelaffi	Lord of Forlì; 1333–1359	Vacant To the Papal States Title next held by Sinibaldo I Ordelaffi
