= Ordelaffi =

Noble family that ruled lower Romagna and Naples

- Noble family
- Country: Papal States; Venice
- Founded: 1084
- Founder: Vitale Faliero
- Final ruler: Antonio Maria Ordelaffi
- Titles: Doge of Venice (non-hereditary); Lord of Forlì and Imola; Lord of Cesena; Lord of Castrocaro
- Styles: "Serenity" (Doge) "Grace"
- Estates: Rocca di Ravaldino (it) (seat); Rocca Malatestiana (2nd seat)
- Dissolution: 1504

The Ordelaffi were a noble family that ruled the city of Forli prior to the dominance of the Riario-Sforza lords.

== History ==
It has been suggested that the Ordelaffi family originated from Treviso, with the first certain mention being a son of Pietro “de Ordelaffo” in 1170. By the late 13th century, they became active in the politics of Forlì and Faenza as leading Ghibellines through figures such as Tebaldo, Teoderico, and Guglielmo, while Tebaldo’s son Scarpetta is considered the founder of the family lordship.

=== Romagna branch ===
Scarpetta Ordelaffi, starting a war against the Republic of Florence in 1302, with the support of the "White" Guelphs, led by Dante Alighieri. In 1303, Scarpetta fought with the podestà Fulcieri da Calboli for the control of Forlì. Finally, the Calboli lost and the Ordelaffi expelled them from the city. Later, Scarpetta conquered Bertinoro. The brother of Scarpetta, Francesco I Ordelaffi, succeeded him to rule Forlì, make alliance with the House of Montefeltro against the House of Malatesta, Guelph family that ruled Cesena and Rimini.

Francesco II Ordelaffi, nephew of Francesco I, lost the power when Cardinald Albornoz was appointed to re-establish the papal's order in Romagna, in 1356. Surround by enemies, Francesco II lost first Faenza, then Cesena and Bertinoro in 1357. Francesco II tried to employ the Great Company's mercenaries, but Albornoz recruited them first. Defeated, Francesco II was expelled from Forlì and gain only Castrocaro and Forlimpopoli.

In 1376 Sinibaldo I Ordelaffi re-conquered Forlì and its territories but was poisoned by his nephew Pino I Ordelaffi, who had later also poisoned Sinibaldo's son Giovanni in 1399, in order to gain Forlì for himself. These murders signaled the beginning of the Oderlaffi decline, though Pino's successors continued to rule Forlì for some time. In 1425, after the death of Teobaldo II Ordelaffi, Forlì passed under the Diocese's control. In 1433 Antonio Ordelaffi restored the signoria, but the Ordelaffi were expelled from Forlì by Pope Sixtus IV, who appointed his nephew Girolamo Riario as Lord of Forlì and Imola. In 1503, Cesare Borgia, styled "Duke of Romagna" only two years earlier, and his family lost their power in the Papal States, and Antonio Maria Ordelaffi gained control on Forlì once more. However, only a year later, Antonio Maria die without male issue, putting an end to the Ordelaffi family line.

=== Venetian branch ===
Arms of the Faliero family.

Other descendants of Lor de Laffia moved to the Republic of Venice, and changed their surname into "Faliero" or "Faledro", the inverted form of "Ordelaf". In Venice, the Faliero branch became powerful and had also two doges in the early 12th century: Vitale Faliero (1084–1095) and Ordelafo Faliero (1102–1117).

In 1211, the Falieros were the first Venetian settlers in the Duchy of Candia (now Crete), starting a profitable trade with the other Mediterranean states.

The family's decline began in 1355, when the Doge Marino Faliero tried to realise a coup d'état in Venice and establish a monarchy, but failed and was decapitated. If there were other significant Falieros, they never expressed a Doge again and at the end of the 14th century the family disappeared.
