= Francesco I Ordelaffi =

Francesco I Ordelaffi (better known as Cecco I, c. 1300 – 1332) was lord of Forlì and Bertinoro from 1315 to 1331. He was the brother and successor of Scarpetta Ordelaffi.

A Ghibelline leader, according to some sources he hosted Dante Alighieri in Forlì in 1316. In 1323 he supported the Ghibelline lord of Arezzo, Guido Tarlati, in the conquest of Città di Castello.

Ousted from Forlì by a Papal army in 1331, he died shortly after by a horse fall.

Preceded by Scarpetta Ordelaffi	Lord of Forlì; 1315–1331	Vacant To the Papal States Title next held by Francesco II Ordelaffi
