= Scarpetta Ordelaffi =

Italian condottiero and lord of Forlì

Scarpetta Ordelaffi (died c. 1315) was an Italian condottiero and lord of Forlì (though with intervals) from 1295 until 1315.

According to chronicler Dino Compagni, in 1302 he was papal vicar in Forlì. In 1295 he took part in the Ghibelline leaders meeting at Argenta. The following year, as commander-in-chief of the Ghibelline forces in the war against the Pope, he was at the siege of Imola, and was therefore excommunicated together with his family and Maghinardo Pagani. He also helped an attempt of return by Florentines exiled, including Dante Alighieri, who was guest of Scarpetta in 1303, receiving also a job as secretary.

In 1303 he fought against the Florentines in the battle of Castel Puliciano. In 1306, along with his brother Pino, he captured the castle of Bertinoro. After his death, he was succeeded by his brother Francesco.

New title	Lord of Forlì; 1295–1315	Succeeded by Francesco I Ordelaffi
