= Cesare Valle =

Italian architect

- Born: 17 June 1902; Rome, Italy
- Died: 10 September 2000 (aged 98); Rome, Italy
- Occupation: Architect

Cesare Valle (17 June 1902 – 10 September 2000) was an Italian architect. His work was part of the architecture event in the art competition at the 1936 Summer Olympics.
