= Forlì Campus =

- Alma Mater Studiorum Forlì
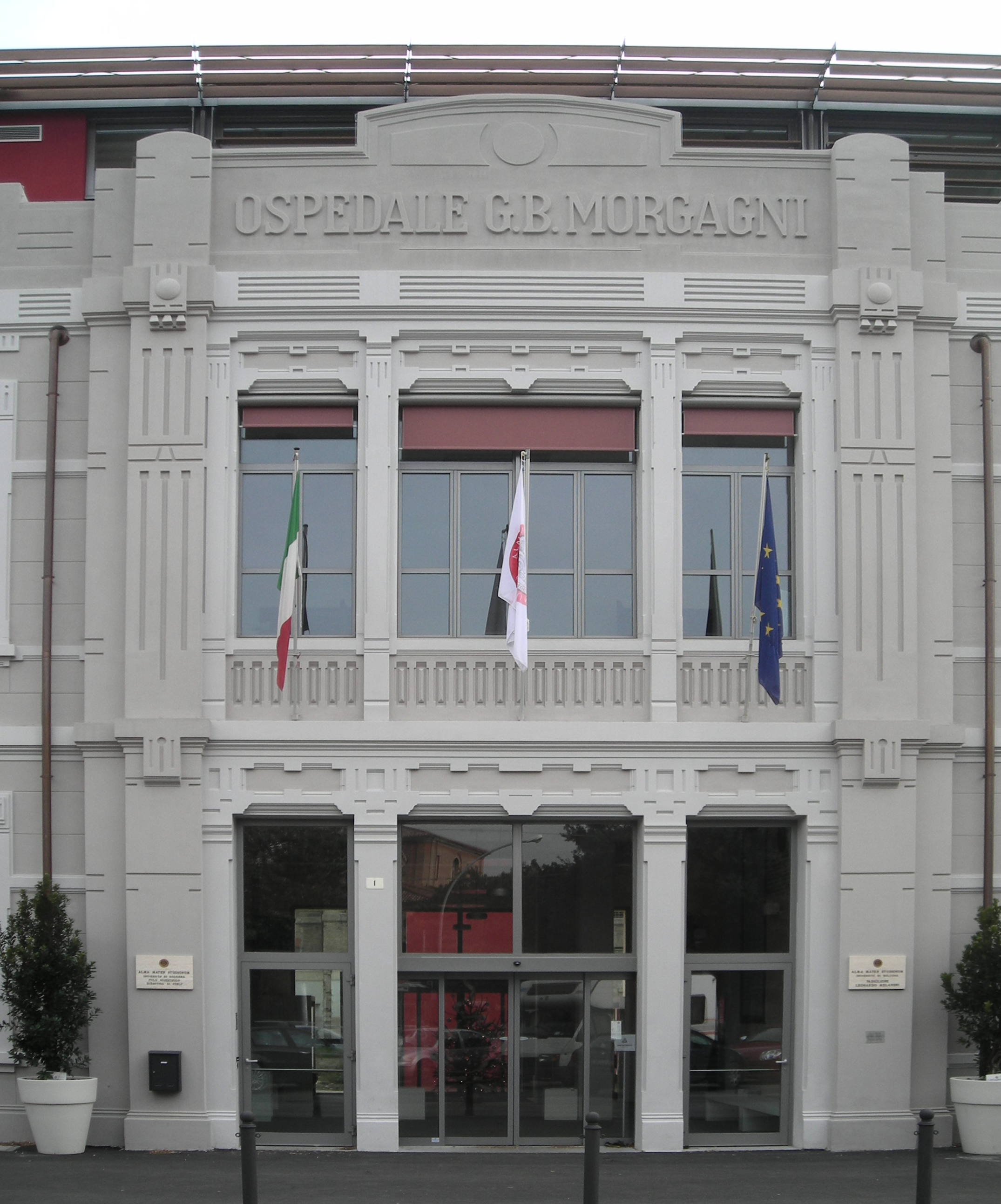
- Entrance pavilion of the Campus
- Type: Campus
- Established: 2001
- Parent institution: University of Bologna
- Location: Forlì, Italy; 44.219158°N 12.04262°E

The Campus of Forlì is one of the decentralized sites of the University of Bologna and part of the university's multicampus system, together with Cesena, Ravenna and Rimini. It was formally established in 2001 as the Forlì Scientific-Didactic Center, following the establishment, between the late 1980s and the 1990s, of the Political Science degree programs and the Higher School of Modern Languages for Interpreters and Translators.

The campus has its main core in the area of the former Morgagni Hospital, which was converted into university facilities, and includes sites and laboratories distributed across different areas of the city, including the airport area. Its educational offering includes degree programs in languages and translation, political and social sciences, economics, engineering, and medicine.

== History ==
The University of Bologna, following the 1996 reform on university autonomy, adopted a multicampus model to guarantee the right to education and promote the territorial distribution of teaching and research activities.

In Forlì, as early as 1989, the second Faculty of Political Science with a political-international orientation, named after Senator Roberto Ruffilli, and the Higher School of Modern Languages for Interpreters and Translators (SSLMIT) had been established; from the outset, they gave the Forlì center a strong international orientation.

In 2001, the Forlì Scientific-Didactic Center was formally established as a decentralized structure of the University. The choice of Forlì was favored both by the city's strategic position in the Romagna area and by the availability of the site of the former "G. B. Morgagni" Hospital, which was progressively converted into university facilities with the support of local authorities.

From its establishment, it was conceived as a distributed center, not limited to a single building complex but organized across several sites throughout the area: alongside the main core in the former Morgagni Hospital area, which houses most of the teaching and administrative facilities, there are buildings and laboratories in other parts of the city, including the airport area.

Since the 2010s, the campus has undergone progressive expansion in both buildings and academic activities: new pavilions and teaching spaces have been opened, including the Teaching Hub (2015), with more than 3,000 study places, and the Campus Park (2017), a landscaped green area equipped for students and residents. In 2018, the Central Pavilion was completed, strengthening the urban connection with the city center.

With the 2011 university reform, which abolished faculties, the center adopted the name Forlì Campus, organizing its activities into departments and schools. At the same time, its educational offering was expanded: alongside the historic programs in modern languages for interpreters and translators (SSLMIT) and political science, programs in economics, management, and engineering were introduced, consolidating the campus's role as a multidisciplinary university center with an international orientation.

The teaching facilities were joined by the Department of Interdisciplinary Studies on Translation, Languages and Cultures (SITLeC), the only department of the Forlì center, and the Forlì branch of the University Language Centre.

From 2020, the single-cycle degree program in Medicine and Surgery was introduced, further broadening the Campus's educational offering.

A further step in its development was taken in 2022 with the inauguration of the Forlì Aerospace and Aeronautical Technology Center (PTA), located near Luigi Ridolfi Airport. The center, promoted by the University of Bologna in cooperation with local and regional authorities, represents a reference point for education, research and innovation in the aeronautics and aerospace sectors.

In 2024, the master's degree program in Nautical Engineering was launched, the first of its kind in Emilia-Romagna, further expanding the educational offering in engineering disciplines connected to the local industrial sector.

== Facilities and services ==
The Forlì Campus has its main core in the area of the former "G. B. Morgagni" Hospital, but is organized as a distributed center, also including sites in other parts of the city, including the Forlì airport area. Its main facilities and services are:

=== Campus (former Morgagni Hospital) ===
Map of the Campus (former hospital)

- Central Pavilion – representative and reception building, inaugurated in 2018 as the hub of the campus.
- Teaching Hub – teaching center completed in 2015, with classrooms seating from 15 to almost 300 people.
- Morgagni Pavilion – numerous classrooms, seminar rooms, and laboratories (Mass Media and Politics, Criminology, LABIC Internet Room, etc.).
- Melandri Pavilion – student services and administrative offices.
- Ruffilli Pavilion – study rooms and departmental spaces for Political and Social Sciences.
- Lazzarini Pavilion – classrooms and research offices.
- Gaddi Pavilion – teaching spaces and offices.
- Vespignani Pavilion – classrooms, laboratories and faculty offices.
- Pallareti Pavilion – supplementary site of the Roberto Ruffilli university library.
- DIT.LAB – language, computer and multimedia laboratories.
- PhD-LAB – rooms for doctoral students and seminar activities.
- Campus Park – landscaped green area equipped for study and social activities.

=== Decentralized sites ===
- Palazzo Montanari (Corso della Repubblica) – historic site of the School of Foreign Languages and Literatures, Interpreting and Translation (SSLMIT), departmental site of Interpreting and Translation, and seminar rooms.
- Engineering Center (Via Montaspro) – houses the teaching facilities for Mechanical and Aerospace Engineering, as well as laboratories associated with the Forlì Aerospace and Aeronautical Technology Center.
- Former Agricultural Station building (Piazzale della Vittoria) – site of the School of Economics, Management and Statistics, with study rooms.
- Building (Via Fontanelle) – departmental site of Industrial Engineering, study rooms, a main lecture hall, and computer laboratories.
- Roberto Ruffilli Central Library (Via Caterina Sforza) – university library with study rooms.
- Palazzo Sassi Masini (Via Sassi) – student dormitory and university residence.
- Other teaching facilities, study spaces, residences and laboratories located in different urban areas.

== Departments ==
The following departments and departmental organizational units are currently based at the Forlì Campus of the University of Bologna:

- Department of Interpreting and Translation (DIT)
- Department of Management – Forlì site (DiSA)
- Departmental Organizational Unit of the Economics Department (DSE)
- Departmental Organizational Unit of the Department of Industrial Engineering (DIN)
- Departmental Organizational Unit of the Department of Political and Social Sciences (SPS)
- Departmental Organizational Unit of the Department of Sociology and Business Law (SDE)

== Educational offering ==
The Forlì Campus hosts bachelor's, master's and single-cycle degree programs, with a strong international orientation. Among the main programs currently offered:

- Languages and Translation
  - Bachelor's degree in Intercultural Linguistic Mediation (L-12)
  - Master's degree in Interpreting (LM-94)
  - Master's degree in Specialized Translation (LM-94)
- Political and Social Sciences
  - Bachelor's degree in International and Diplomatic Sciences (L-36)
  - Master's degree in International and Diplomatic Sciences (LM-52)
  - Master's degree in Mass Media and Politics (LM-62)
- Economics and Management
  - Bachelor's degree in Economics and Business (L-33)
  - Master's degree in Economics and Management (LM-77)
  - Master's degree in International Economics and Commerce (LM-77)
- Medicine and Surgery
  - Single-cycle degree program in Medicine and Surgery (LM-41)
- Engineering
  - Bachelor's degree in Aerospace Engineering (L-9)
  - Master's degree in Aerospace Engineering (LM-20)
  - Master's degree in Mechanical Engineering (LM-33)
  - Master's degree in Nautical Engineering (LM-34)

Doctoral programs and first- and second-level master's programs are also offered.

== Governance ==
As at the other campuses in Cesena, Ravenna and Rimini, a Campus Council has been established at the Forlì Campus to coordinate support for the teaching and research activities carried out by the Schools and university departments.

The council is chaired by the Campus President, who is the legal representative of the Campus. The President is elected by the professors and researchers, technical and administrative staff, and student representatives at the Campus. The term of office expires after three years and may be renewed only once for a further three-year term.

The Campus Council consists of the President and:

- Directors of the departments based at the Campus;
- Heads of the Departmental Organizational Units;
- Presidents of the Schools or Vice-Presidents;
- Coordinators of degree programs and doctoral programs based at the Campus; as well as Directors of interdepartmental research centers or analogous structures under Article 25 based at the Campus;
- student representatives amounting to 15% of the number of Council members;
- technical and administrative staff representatives amounting to 10% of the number of Council members;
- the Campus administrative and management officer;
- one representative jointly designated by the local authorities;
- one representative designated by the supporting body.

== Bibliography ==
- Lamberto Rossi; Marco Tarabella (2012). The Forlì Campus. The University of Bologna center in the former Morgagni Hospital. Edizioni IN Magazine.

== See also ==
- Forlì
- University of Bologna
