= Gino Mattarelli =

Italian politician (1921–1986)

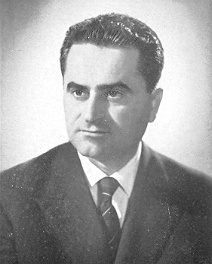
Gino Mattarelli

Gino Mattarelli (Bertinoro, 28 October 1921 – Florence, 25 October 1986) was an Italian politician, deputy of the Christian Democracy party. He was State Secretary for State Holdings from 30 June 1972 to 5 July 1973.
