= Forlì =

Forlì Furlè (Romagnol)
- Comune
- Comune di Forlì
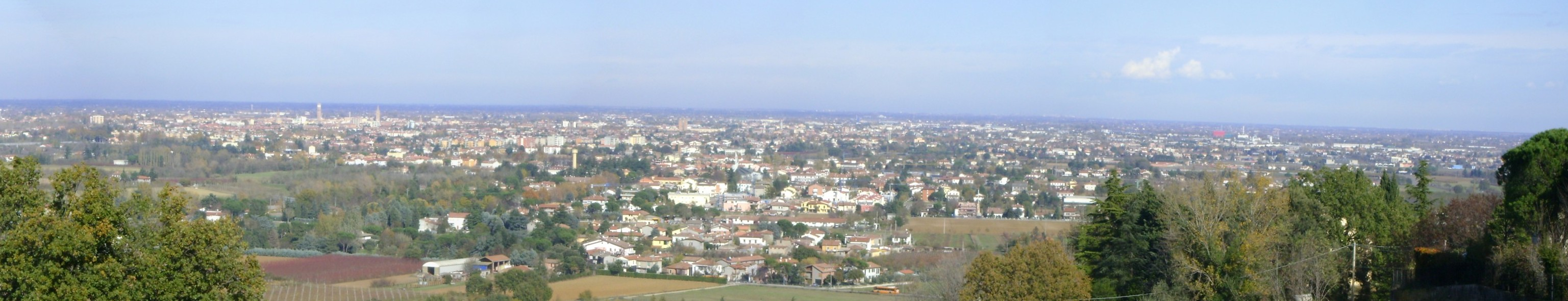
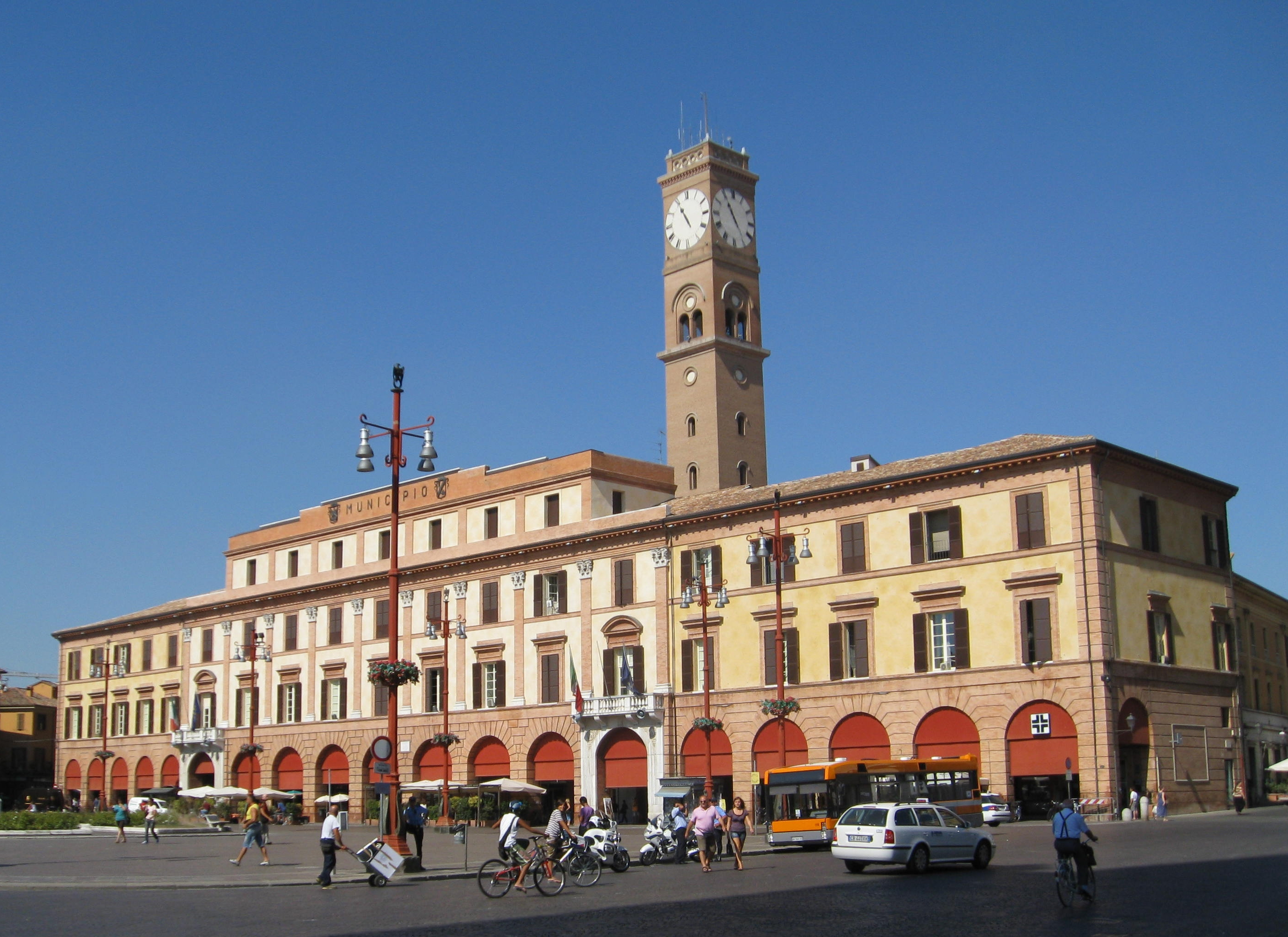
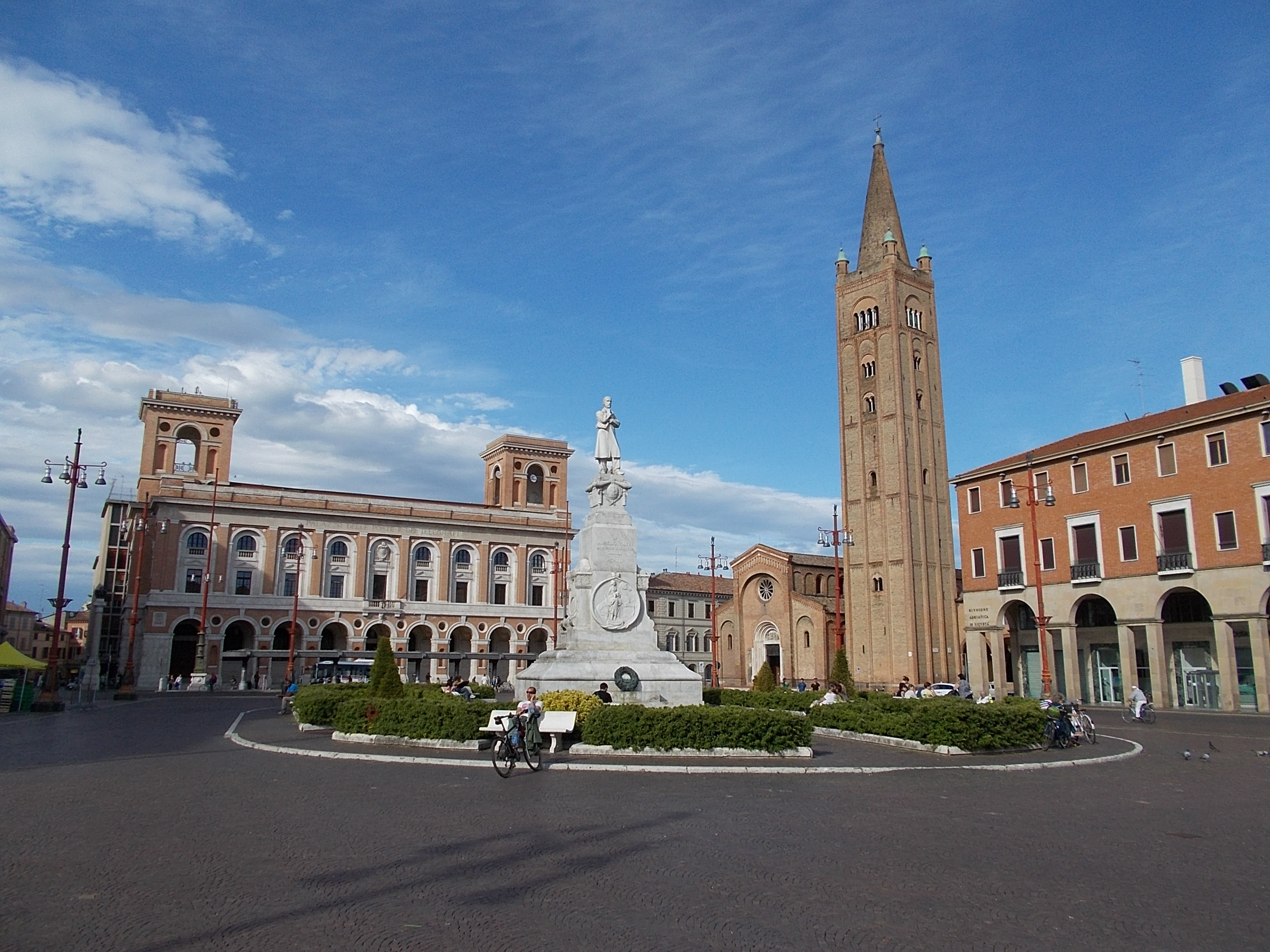
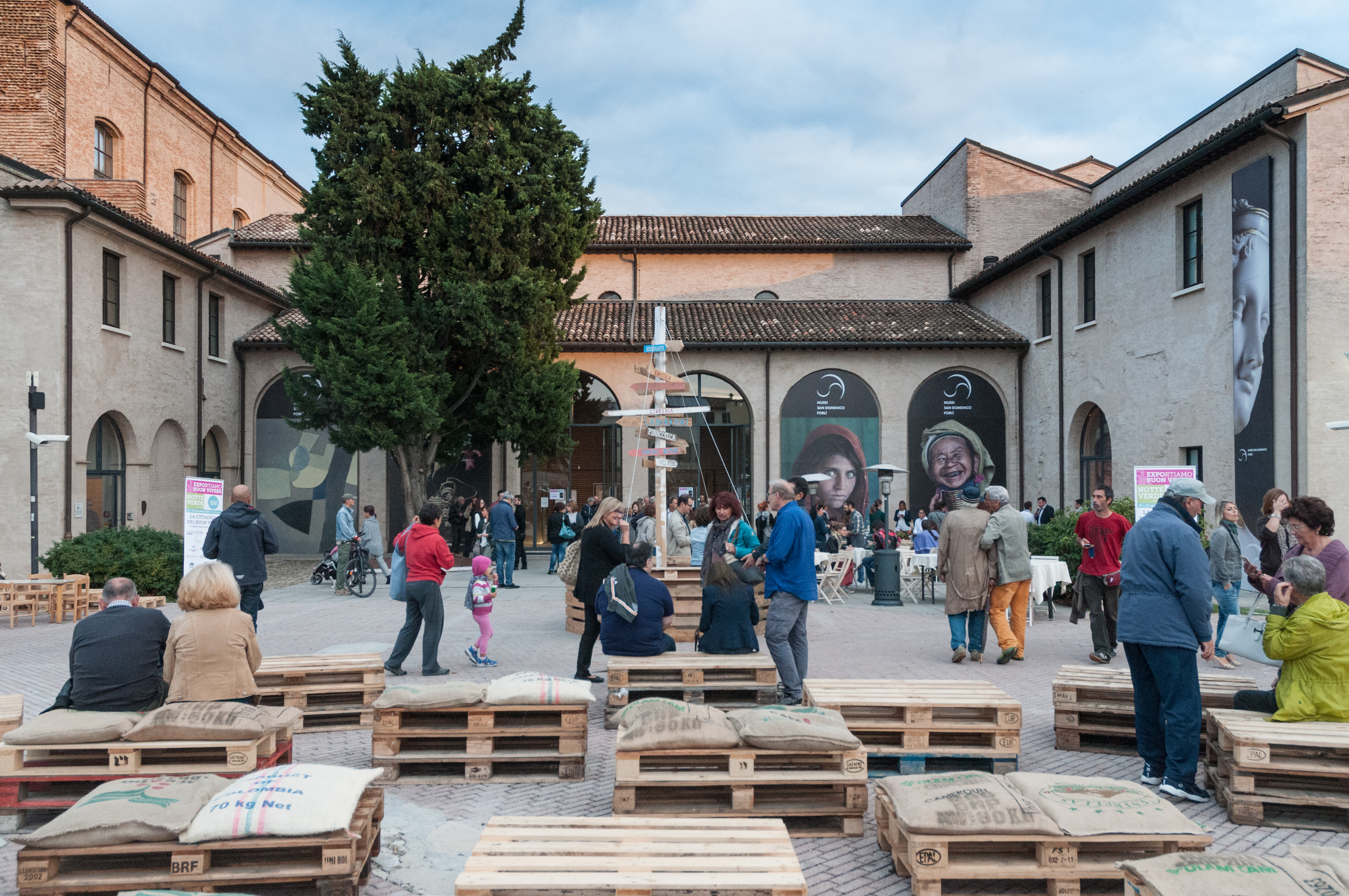
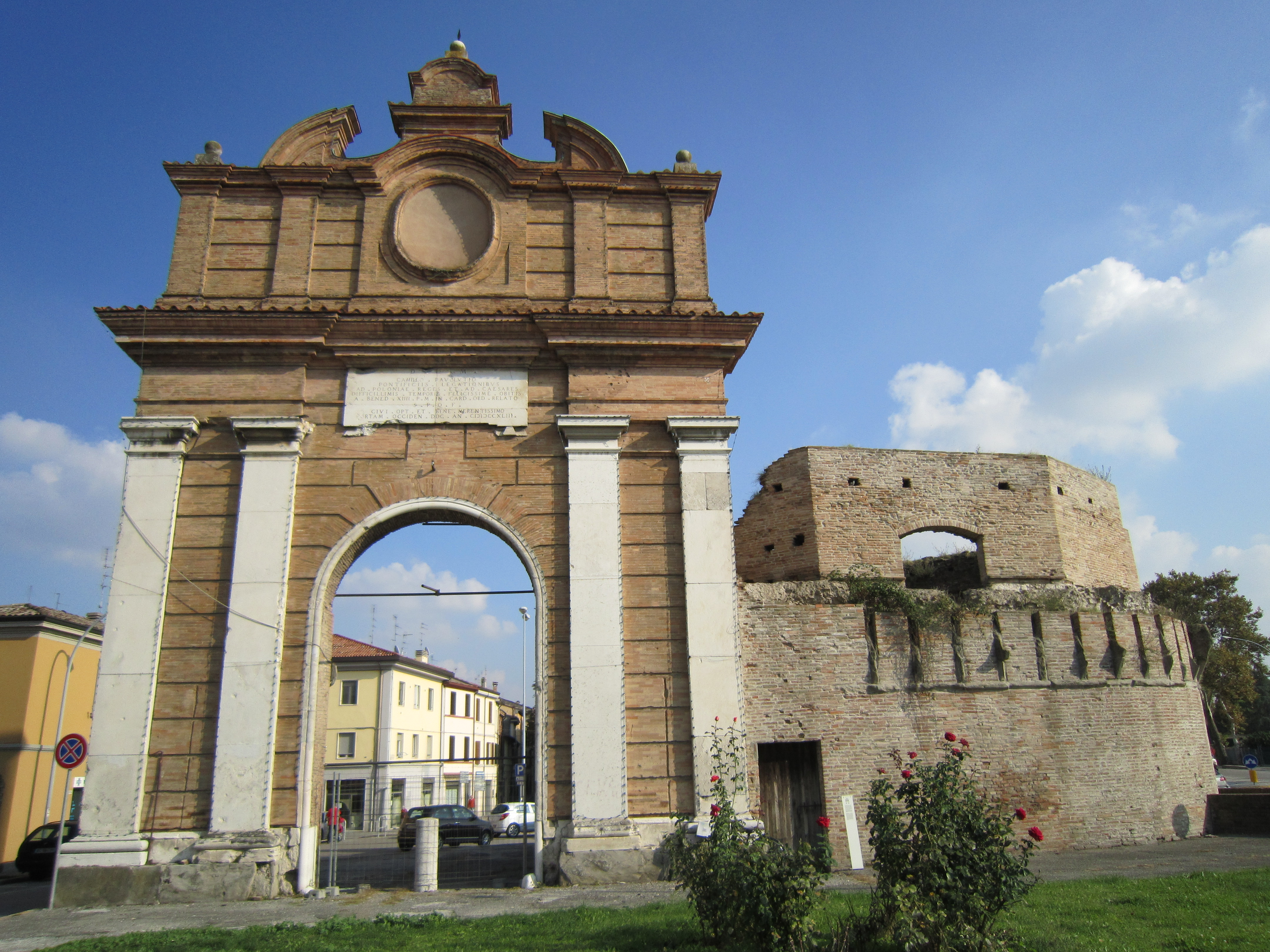
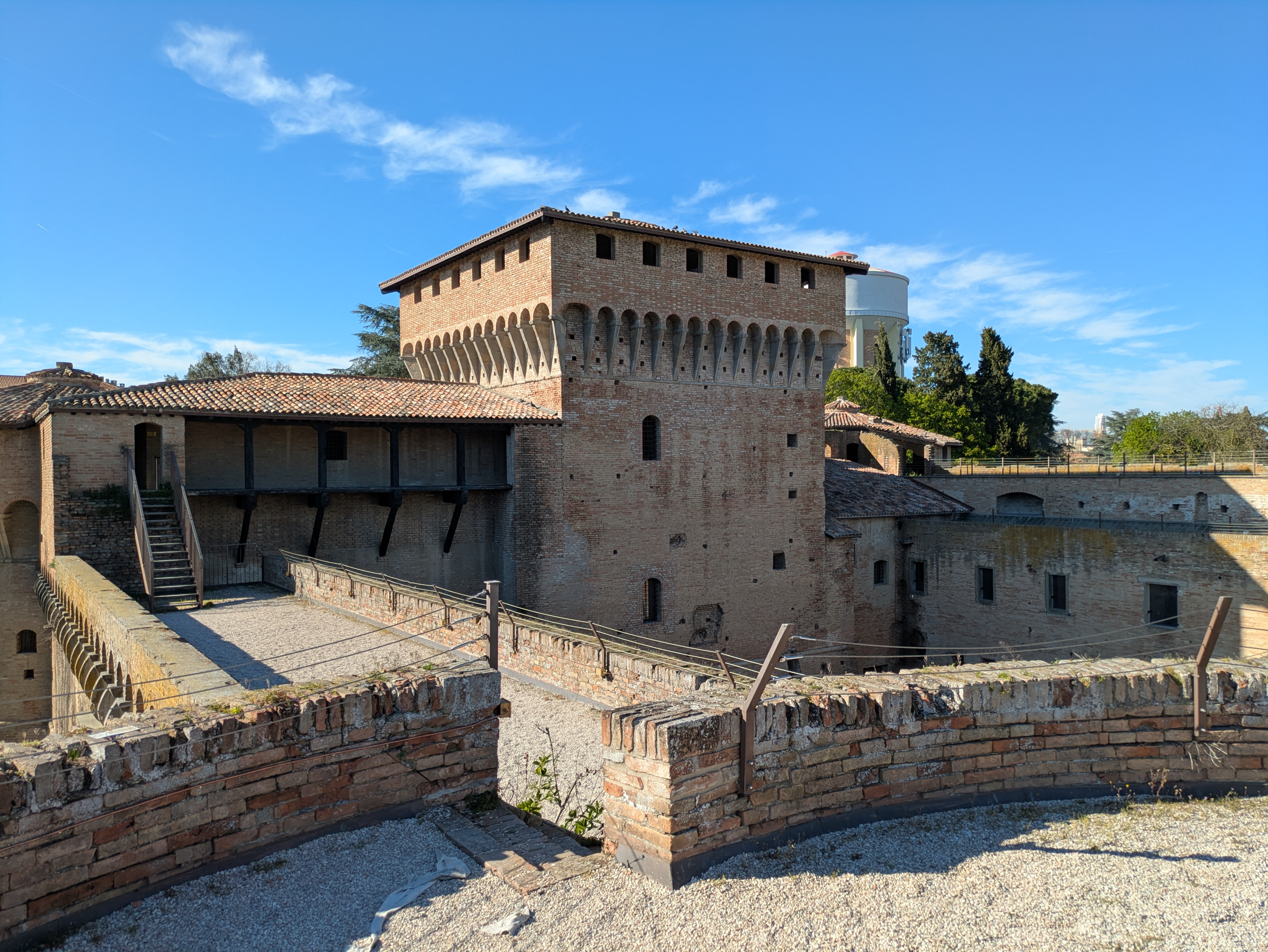
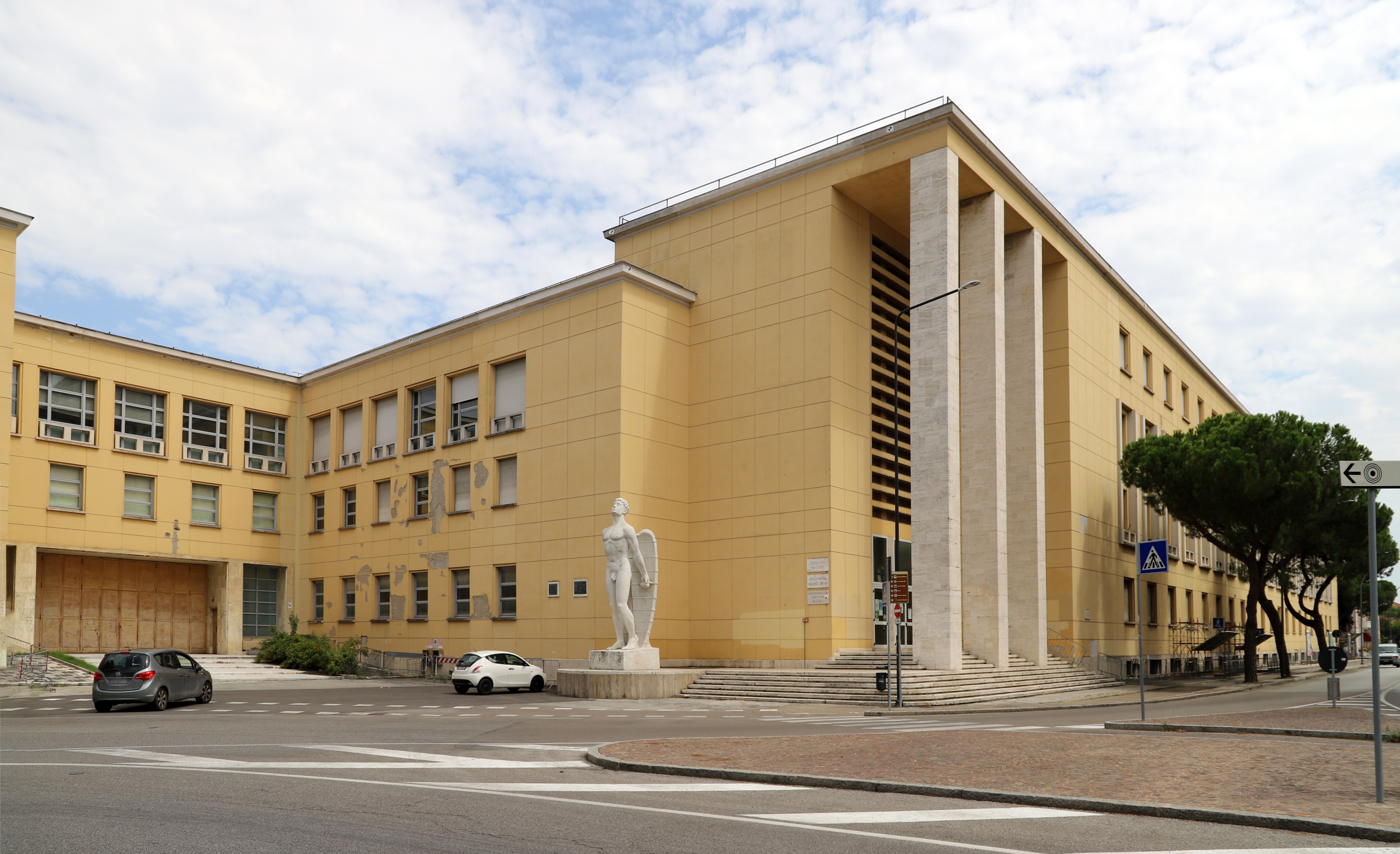
- View of Forlì Palazzo Comunale Piazza Aurelio Saffi Museo Civico San Domenico Porta Schiavonia Ravaldino Fortress Former Aeronautical College Palace

- Flag Coat of arms

- Location within Italy Location within Emilia-Romagna
- Coordinates: 44°13′22″N 12°2′29″E
- Country: Italy
- Region: Emilia-Romagna
- Province: Forlì-Cesena (FC)
- Frazioni: see list

Government
  - Mayor: Gian Luca Zattini

Area
  - Total: 228.20 km^{2} (88.11 sq mi)
- Elevation: 34 m (112 ft)

Population (2026)
  - Total: 118,053
  - Density: 517.32/km^{2} (1,339.9/sq mi)
- Demonym: Forlivesi
- Time zone: UTC+1 (CET)
  - Summer (DST): UTC+2 (CEST)
- Postal code: 47121-47122
- Dialing code: 0543
- Patron saint: Beata Vergine del Fuoco
- Saint day: 4 February
- Website: Official website

Forlì (/fɔːrˈliː/ for-LEE; Italian: [forˈli]; Romagnol: Furlè [furˈlɛ]; Latin: Forum Livii) is a city and comune (municipality) in the region of Emilia-Romagna in northern Italy, and is, together with Cesena, the capital of the Province of Forlì-Cesena. With a population of 118,053 as of 2026, it is the 38th-largest city in Italy.

Forlì has ancient Roman origins and developed during the Middle Ages as a free commune and one of the principal Ghibelline centres of Romagna. From the late 13th century it was dominated, with interruptions, by the Ordelaffi family and in the late 15th century became the domain of Caterina Sforza. The city was incorporated into the Papal States in the early 16th century and later became involved in the Risorgimento. Its historic centre contains architectural remains from the Middle Ages, the Renaissance, the Baroque, and the 20th-century Fascist period. Forlì also has an extensive museum network and is a university centre through the Forlì Campus of the University of Bologna.

== History ==
=== Ancient era ===
The area around Forlì has been inhabited since prehistoric times. The nearby archaeological site of Ca' Belvedere at Monte Poggiolo, in the territory of Castrocaro Terme e Terra del Sole, has yielded stone artefacts dating to around 800,000–900,000 years ago, among the oldest evidence of human presence in Europe.

Forlì itself originated as the Roman settlement of Forum Livii, established in connection with the Via Aemilia. The precise date of its foundation remains uncertain. The traditional date of around 188 BC has been proposed by some historians, while others place its foundation later, during the time of Julius Caesar. Local research rejects the older attribution to Marcus Livius Salinator and regards the identity of the founder as uncertain.

=== Middle Ages ===
Following the collapse of the Western Roman Empire, Forlì became part of the successive political entities that controlled Romagna, including the Ostrogothic Kingdom, the Byzantine territories of the Exarchate of Ravenna, and the Lombard and Frankish realms. By the late 9th century the city was governing itself as a republic, traditionally dated to 889, and increasingly aligned itself with the Ghibelline side in its conflicts with papal authority.

During the 13th century Forlì became one of the principal Ghibelline strongholds in Romagna. In 1282 the city resisted a French army sent by Pope Martin IV; the battle is remembered in Dante's Inferno. After the collapse of Hohenstaufen power, Guido da Montefeltro took refuge in Forlì and served as capitano del popolo.

At the beginning of the 14th century, the Ordelaffi emerged as the dominant family in Forlì. Their rule was interrupted several times by papal intervention, but the family retained control over the city for much of the period from 1302 to the late 15th century. Scarpetta Ordelaffi hosted Dante in Forlì in 1303, while later members of the family fought repeatedly against papal attempts to reassert direct control over Romagna.

=== Renaissance and early modern period ===
The best-known Ordelaffi ruler was Pino III Ordelaffi, lord of Forlì from 1466 to 1480. During his rule the city's fortifications and public buildings were expanded and the arts were supported. After his death, political instability allowed Pope Sixtus IV to impose his nephew Girolamo Riario as lord of Forlì. Riario married Caterina Sforza, who became one of the most prominent figures in the city's history.

Caterina Sforza defended Forlì during the siege of 1488 and remained its ruler until the city was conquered by Cesare Borgia in January 1500. After a brief restoration of Ordelaffi rule in 1503–1504, Forlì was incorporated into the Papal States and lost its political independence.

For the following three centuries Forlì remained under papal rule. The period saw less political upheaval but continued artistic and scientific activity. The city was associated with painters such as Carlo Cignani and with the physician Giovanni Battista Morgagni, while architect Giuseppe Merenda designed or remodelled a number of churches and palaces.

=== Napoleonic period and the Risorgimento ===
French troops entered Forlì in June 1796 during the French Revolutionary Wars, and Napoleon visited the city on 4 February 1797. The Napoleonic administrative reorganisation placed Forlì within the Department of Rubicon.

After the Restoration, Forlì returned to papal rule. The city subsequently became involved in the political movements of the Risorgimento, with local participation in the uprisings of 1821, 1831 and 1848 and in the movement for Italian unification. Among the city's leading political figures was Aurelio Saffi, a member of the triumvirate of the Roman Republic of 1849.

=== 20th century and World War II ===
Following Italian unification, Forlì developed as an agricultural, commercial and industrial centre. Its economy remained closely linked to agriculture, while labour disputes and agrarian struggles contributed to the growth of republican, socialist and Catholic organisations during the late 19th and early 20th centuries.

In the 1920s and 1930s, the Fascist regime profoundly altered the urban landscape. A new monumental axis was developed between the railway station and the historic centre, particularly along today's Viale della Libertà and around the Piazzale della Vittoria. A series of public, educational and sporting buildings were constructed in rationalist and monumental styles.

During World War II, Forlì suffered repeated Allied bombing and extensive destruction. During the German retreat in November 1944, several major buildings and monuments were destroyed or damaged, including the civic tower, the cathedral bell tower, the clock tower and the Church of San Biagio. The city was liberated on 9 November 1944 by Allied forces together with formations of the local Resistance.

After the war, Forlì underwent reconstruction and a period of economic recovery. The city subsequently developed a diversified economy based on manufacturing, agriculture, commerce and services, while strengthening its cultural and university institutions.

== Geography ==
Forlì lies in the southeastern part of the Po Valley, in the historical region of Romagna, between the alluvial plain and the northern Apennine Mountains. The city centre is a few kilometres from the foothills of the Apennines and about 25 km (16 mi) from the Adriatic Sea. The municipal territory is crossed by several watercourses, notably the Montone, Rabbi and Ronco rivers. The city developed along the ancient Via Emilia, which remains a major east-west transport corridor through northern Italy.

=== Territorial subdivisions ===
Forlì is divided into territorial subdivisions, or frazioni.

==== Villafranca di Forlì ====
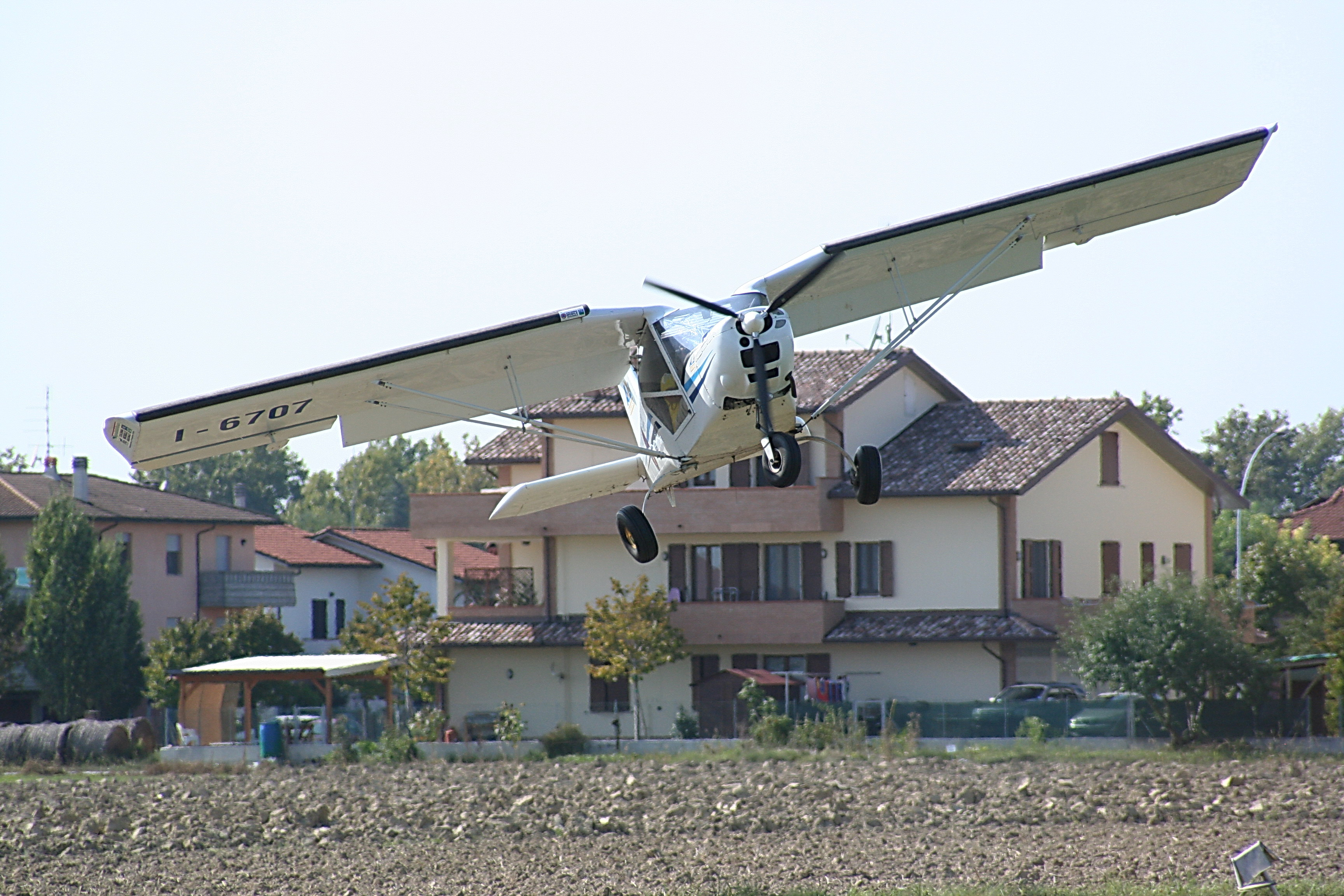
Landing field at Villafranca di Forlì

Villafranca di Forlì is a frazione in the northern part of the municipality, west of the main urban area and near the Montone. It is also the location of a small recreational airfield used for ultralight and model aircraft activities.

==== Other frazioni ====
- Bagnolo
- Barisano
- Borgo Sisa
- Branzolino
- Carpena
- Carpinello
- Casemurate
- Caserma
- Castiglione
- Ca'Ossi
- Cava
- Collina
- Coriano
- Durazzanino
- Forniolo
- Grisignano
- Ladino
- Magliano
- Malmissole
- Massa
- Ospedaletto
- Para
- Pescaccia
- Petrignone
- Pianta
- Pieve Acquedotto
- Pievequinta
- Poggio
- Ponte Vico
- Quattro
- Ravaldino in Monte
- Romiti
- Roncadello
- Ronco
- Rotta
- Rovere
- San Giorgio
- San Leonardo in Schiova
- San Lorenzo in Noceto
- San Martino in Strada
- San Martino in Villafranca
- San Tomé
- San Varano
- Vecchiazzano
- Villa Rovere
- Villa Selva
- Villagrappa
- Villanova

== Climate ==
Forlì has a humid subtropical climate (Cfa in the Köppen climate classification) with Mediterranean influences. Summers are generally hot and relatively dry, while winters are cool and humid, with fog occurring frequently. The proximity of the Adriatic Sea moderates temperature extremes to some extent.

Climate data for Forlì (1991–2020)
Month	Jan	Feb	Mar	Apr	May	Jun	Jul	Aug	Sep	Oct	Nov	Dec	Year
Mean daily maximum °C (°F)	7.4 (45.3)	9.9 (49.8)	14.5 (58.1)	18.6 (65.5)	23.6 (74.5)	28.3 (82.9)	30.7 (87.3)	30.3 (86.5)	25.0 (77.0)	19.2 (66.6)	12.9 (55.2)	8.0 (46.4)	19.0 (66.2)
Daily mean °C (°F)	4.2 (39.6)	5.6 (42.1)	9.7 (49.5)	13.8 (56.8)	18.4 (65.1)	22.8 (73.0)	25.1 (77.2)	24.9 (76.8)	20.3 (68.5)	15.2 (59.4)	9.9 (49.8)	5.0 (41.0)	14.6 (58.3)
Mean daily minimum °C (°F)	1.1 (34.0)	1.4 (34.5)	5.0 (41.0)	9.0 (48.2)	13.2 (55.8)	17.3 (63.1)	19.5 (67.1)	19.5 (67.1)	15.4 (59.7)	11.3 (52.3)	6.8 (44.2)	2.0 (35.6)	10.1 (50.2)
Average precipitation mm (inches)	43.8 (1.72)	53.9 (2.12)	60.9 (2.40)	65.5 (2.58)	64.7 (2.55)	48.3 (1.90)	41.0 (1.61)	57.8 (2.28)	74.6 (2.94)	87.0 (3.43)	96.3 (3.79)	66.7 (2.63)	760.5 (29.94)
Average precipitation days (≥ 1.0 mm)	6	6	7	8	6	5	4	5	7	8	9	8	79
Source: Arpae Emilia-Romagna

== Demographics ==
Historical population
Year	Pop.	±%
1861	37,477	—
1871	38,639	+3.1%
1881	40,915	+5.9%
1901	43,321	+5.9%
1911	45,723	+5.5%
1921	51,555	+12.8%
1931	60,140	+16.7%
1936	65,683	+9.2%
1951	77,508	+18.0%
1961	91,945	+18.6%
1971	104,971	+14.2%
1981	110,806	+5.6%
1991	109,541	−1.1%
2001	108,335	−1.1%
2011	116,434	+7.5%
2021	116,558	+0.1%
Source: ISTAT

As of 2026, the population is 118,053, of which 49.1% are males, and 50.9% are females. Minors make up 14.4% of the population, and seniors make up 26.0%.

=== Immigration ===
As of 2025, immigrants make up 16.3% of the population. The 5 largest foreign countries of birth are Romania, Albania, Morocco, China, and Ukraine.

Foreign-born population (2025)
Country of birth	Population
Romania	2,534
Albania	2,442
Morocco	1,789
China	1,731
Ukraine	940
Burkina Faso	736
Bangladesh	624
North Macedonia	579
Nigeria	538
Tunisia	529
Senegal	525
Moldova	435
Pakistan	371
Poland	337
Ivory Coast	307

== Government ==
Gian Luca Zattini has served as mayor of Forlì since 2019 and was re-elected on 9–10 June 2024, winning 50.63% of the vote in the first round.

== Sights ==
Forlì's historic centre contains buildings and monuments dating from the Middle Ages to the 20th century.

=== Piazza Aurelio Saffi ===
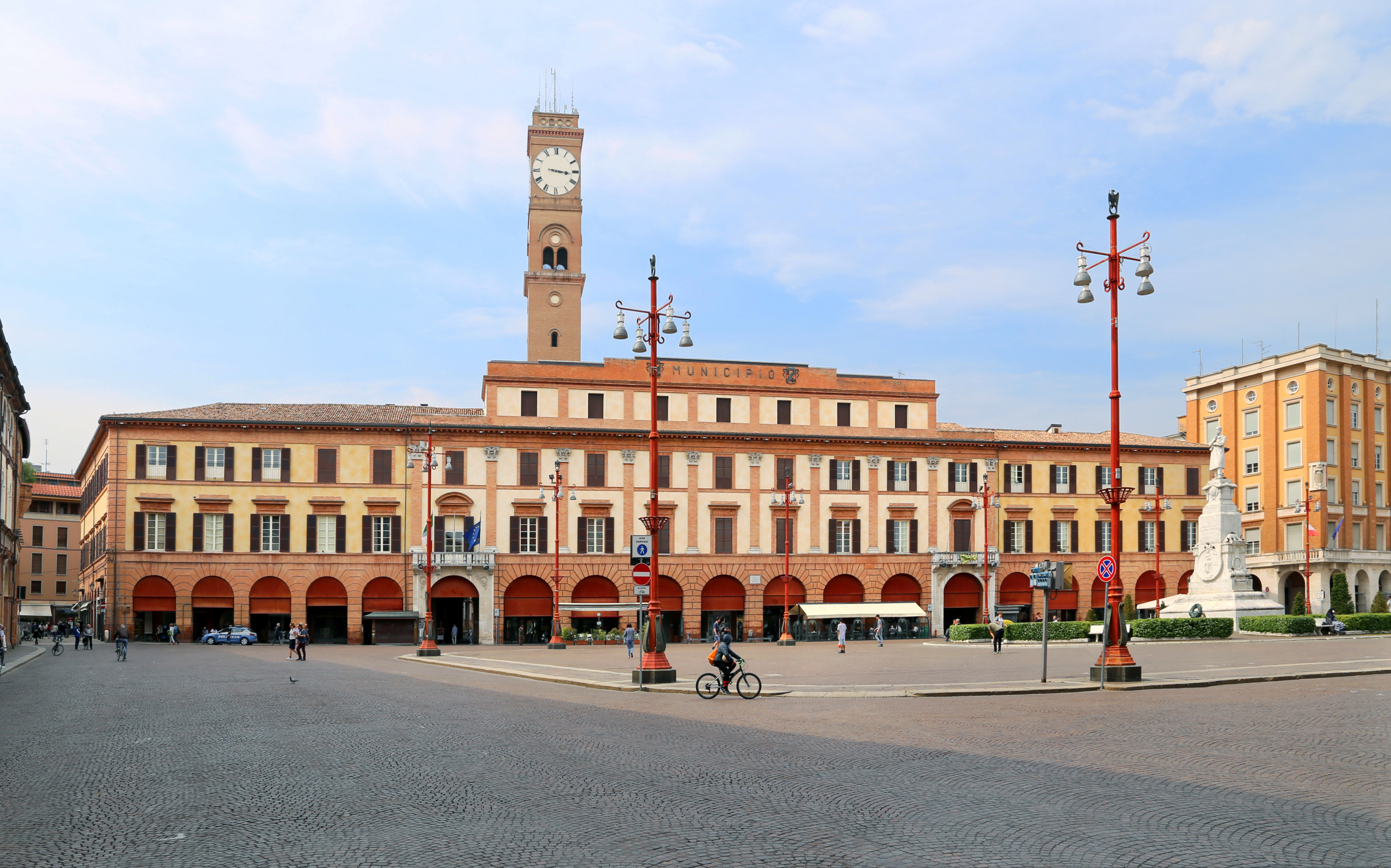
Palazzo Municipale on Piazza Aurelio Saffi

Piazza Aurelio Saffi is the principal square in the historic centre and one of the city's main civic spaces. It is dominated by a statue of Aurelio Saffi, one of the leading republican figures of the Risorgimento.

The square is surrounded by important historic buildings, including the Palazzo Comunale, Palazzo Albertini, the Palazzo del Podestà and the Abbey of San Mercuriale.

=== Abbey of San Mercuriale ===
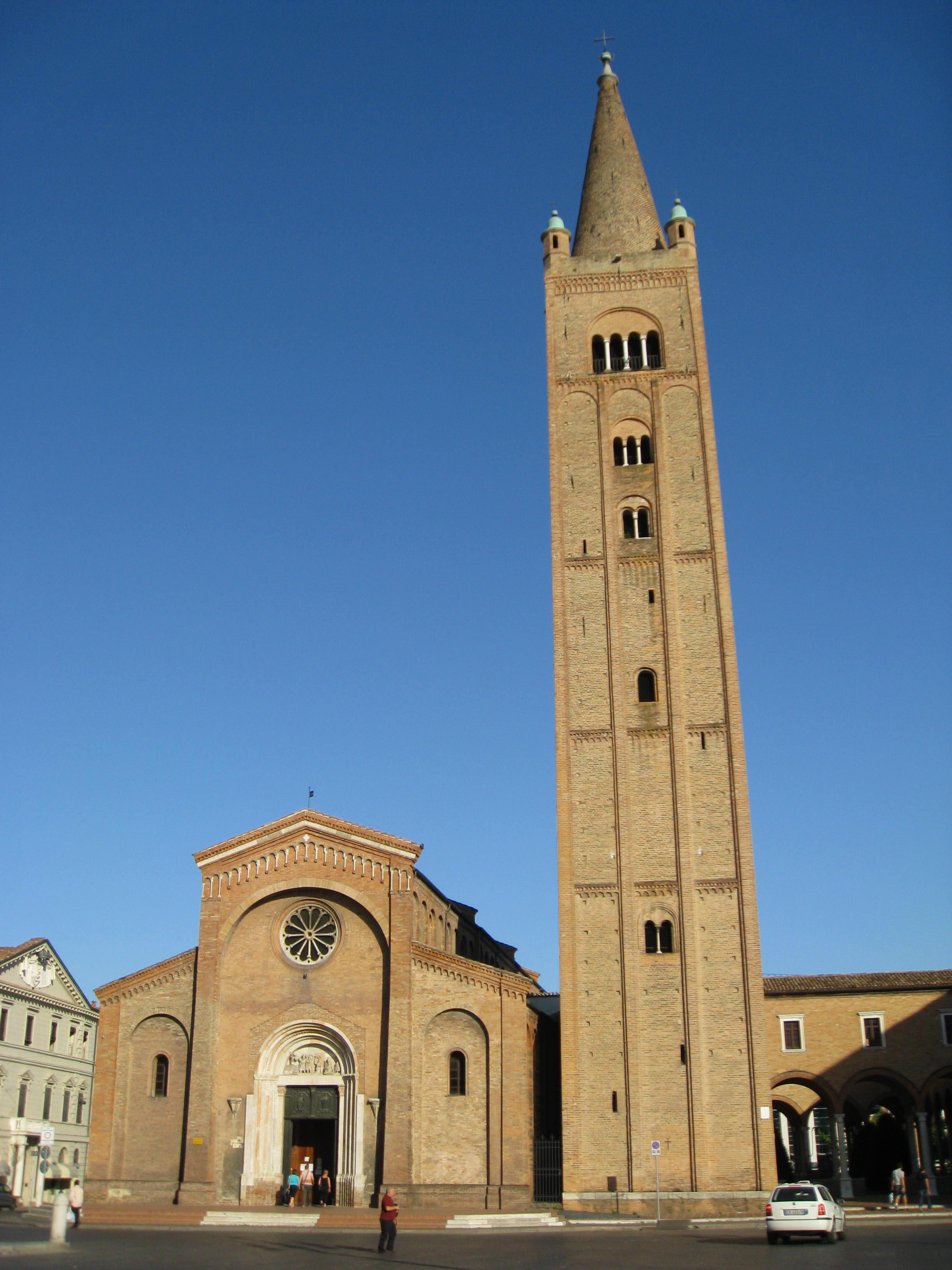
Abbey of San Mercuriale

The Abbey of San Mercuriale, on Piazza Aurelio Saffi, is one of the symbols of Forlì and the city's best-known religious monument. Built between 1178 and 1181 on the remains of an earlier church dedicated to Saint Stephen, it is an important example of Romanesque Lombard architecture in Romagna.

Its Lombard-style bell tower rises more than 70 m (230 ft) above the square. The church contains several notable works of art, including the 1466 funeral monument of Barbara Manfredi by Francesco di Simone Ferrucci and paintings by Marco Palmezzano.

=== Cathedral of the Holy Cross ===
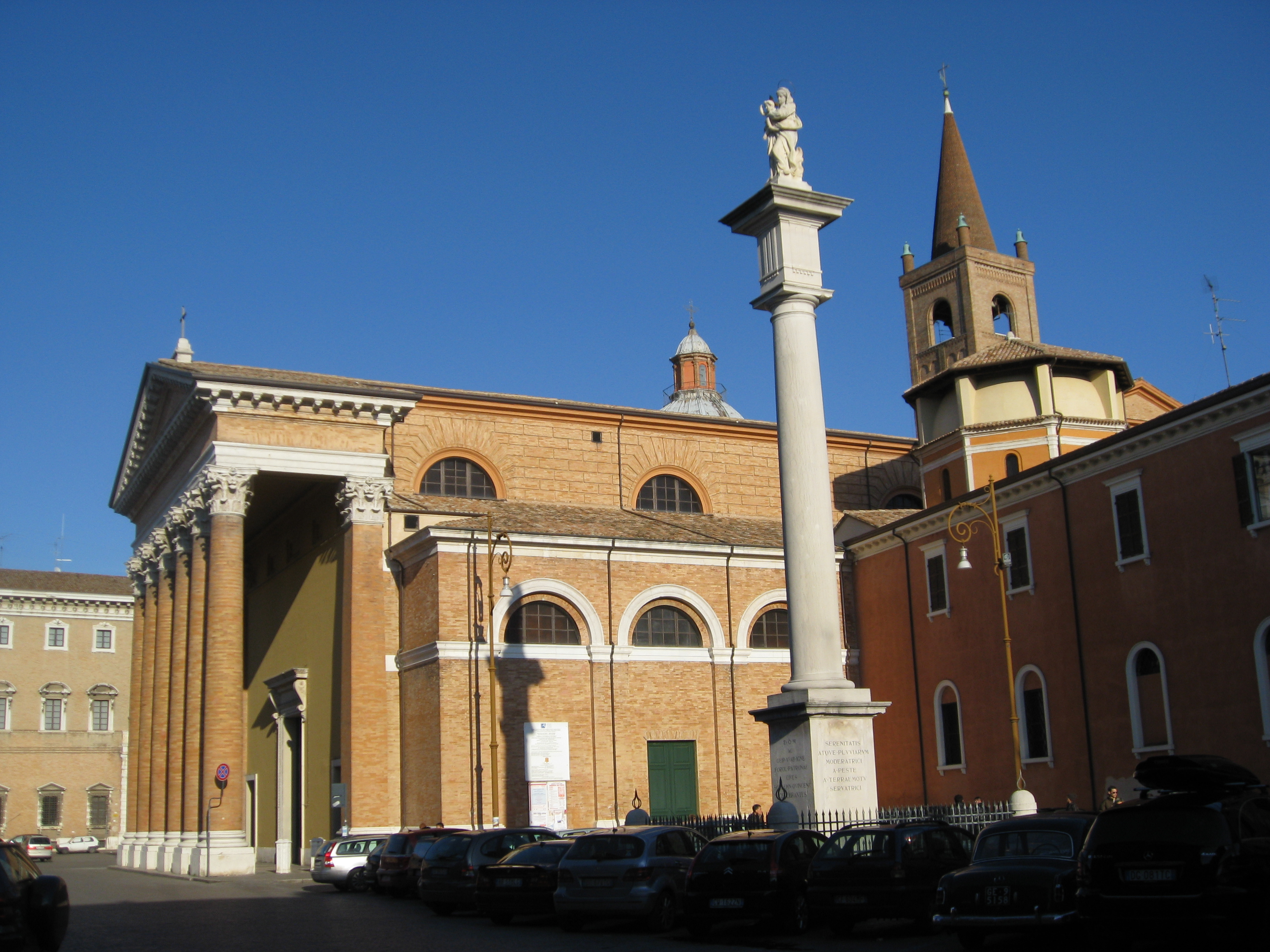
Forlì Cathedral

The Cathedral of the Holy Cross (Cattedrale di Santa Croce) is the cathedral of the Roman Catholic Diocese of Forlì-Bertinoro. It is documented from the 10th century and was rebuilt following a fire in the second half of the 12th century. The building was extensively remodelled in the 15th century and later almost completely reconstructed in the 19th century, with the present church consecrated in 1890.

The cathedral contains the chapel of the Madonna del Fuoco, the city's principal Marian devotion. According to tradition, on 4 February 1428 an image of the Virgin on paper survived a fire that destroyed a nearby school. The image was subsequently transferred to the cathedral and became the focus of the annual Feast of the Madonna del Fuoco.

=== Church of San Biagio ===
The former Church of San Biagio was one of Forlì's historic religious buildings. The earlier church was destroyed by bombing in 1944 and rebuilt in 1953. It had contained the Feo Chapel, decorated by Melozzo da Forlì and Marco Palmezzano, as well as an Immaculate Conception by Guido Reni.

=== Church of San Giacomo Apostolo ===
San Giacomo Apostolo, Forlì is part of the Dominican complex founded in Forlì in the first half of the 13th century. The church was remodelled over the following centuries and extensively renovated in modern times. It is now integrated into the cultural complex of San Domenico and is used for exhibitions and cultural events.

=== Military architecture ===
==== Ravaldino Fortress ====
Ravaldino Fortress was one of the main fortifications of Forlì. It was strengthened during the 14th and 15th centuries under the Ordelaffi and later under Caterina Sforza. The fortress played a central role in the defence of the city during the conflicts of the late 15th century and the campaign of Cesare Borgia in 1499–1500.

==== Porta Schiavonia ====
Porta Schiavonia is one of the surviving gates of Forlì's historic defensive system and one of the principal entrances to the medieval and early modern city.

=== Museums ===
Forlì has an extensive municipal museum network. The main institutions include the Museo Civico San Domenico, which houses the Civic Art Gallery; Palazzo Romagnoli and its 20th-century collections; the Museo Romagnolo del Teatro; the Museo del Risorgimento; and the Casa Museo Villa Saffi. Other museums include the Antonio Santarelli Archaeological Museum and specialist collections.

The San Domenico museum complex originated as a Dominican convent founded in the 13th century. Its collections include works by Beato Angelico, Lorenzo di Credi, Marco Palmezzano and Antonio Canova, while the Verzocchi Collection contains 70 paintings on the theme of work in 20th-century Italian art. The complex also hosts major temporary exhibitions.

=== Fascist and rationalist architecture ===
Forlì contains one of the most significant concentrations of interwar public architecture in Emilia-Romagna. During the 1930s the area between the railway station and the historic centre was redesigned around Viale della Libertà and Piazzale della Vittoria, with schools, administrative buildings and sporting facilities constructed in monumental and rationalist forms.

==== Monument to the Fallen ====
One of the side fountains of the Monument to the Fallen

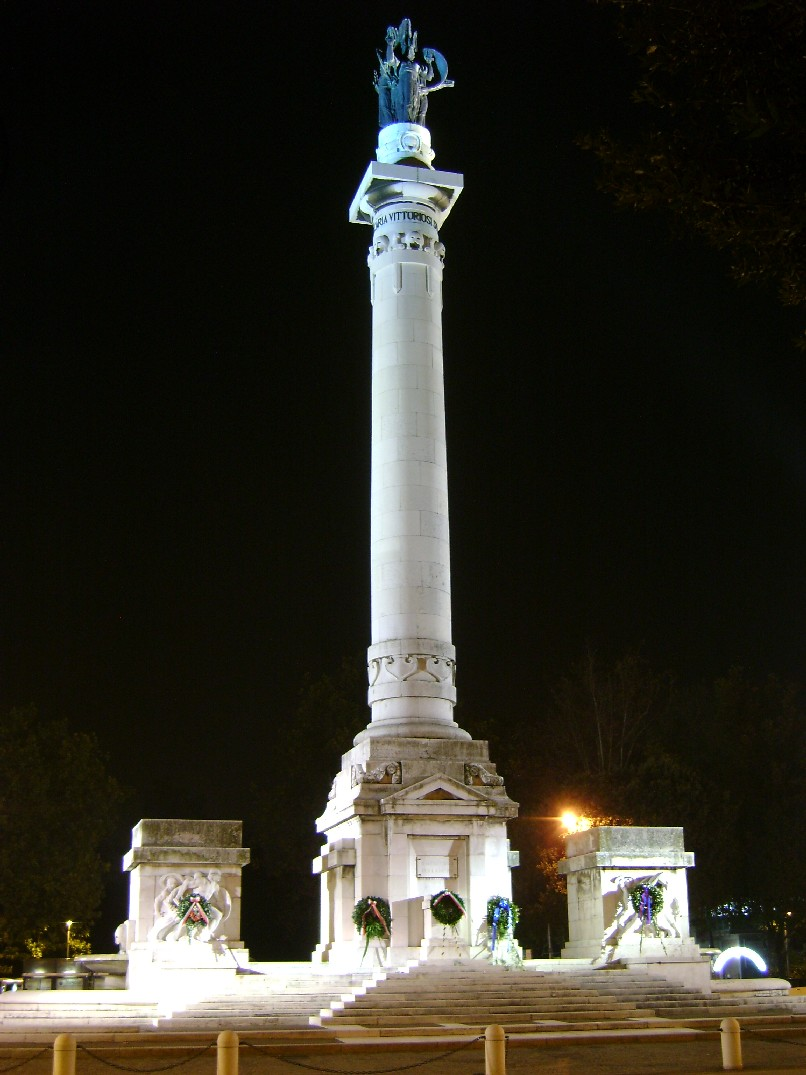
Monument to the Fallen of the First World War

The Monument to the Fallen of the First World War in Piazzale della Vittoria was designed by Cesare Bazzani and built in 1932. It consists of a 22-metre Doric honorary column clad in stone from Trani, surmounted by a bronze representation of Victory. Two large side altars are decorated with reliefs symbolising attack, defence, sacrifice and triumph.

==== Casa Stadio della GIL ====
The Casa Stadio della GIL was designed by Cesare Valle and built between 1933 and 1935. The complex included a gymnasium, a cinema and a covered swimming pool, and formed part of the Fascist programme for youth education and physical training. The pool was later removed, while much of the original architectural fabric survives.

==== Aeronautical College ====
The Aeronautical College was designed by Cesare Valle and constructed between 1935 and 1941. It combined residential, educational and sporting functions and is regarded as one of the major Italian examples of rationalist architecture associated with the Fascist period.

=== Parks ===
==== Parco della Resistenza ====
The Parco della Resistenza is a public park immediately outside the historic centre. It covers almost 5 hectares and combines a historic formal section, created in the first half of the 19th century, with a later landscape-style extension made in the 1970s. The historic section underwent a major redevelopment in 2023.

==== Parco urbano Franco Agosto ====
The Parco urbano Franco Agosto is one of Forlì's main urban green spaces. It contains large lawns, a pond, children's play areas and recreational facilities, and is located near the Montone River.

==== Parco di via Dragoni ====
The Parco di via Dragoni is one of the largest parks in the city and contains cycle and fitness paths, an outdoor arena, a skatepark, sports courts, a children's area and facilities for young people.

== Economy ==
Forlì has a diversified economy in which commerce, agriculture, construction, manufacturing, hospitality and services all play significant roles. In the wider Forlì-Cesena area, commerce and agriculture are among the largest sectors by number of active enterprises, followed by construction and manufacturing.

Forlì is also an industrial centre for the marine sector. Ferretti Group has its headquarters and a major production centre in the city, where Ferretti, Itama and Wally yachts are built.

The city also has an important aerospace and technological sector linked to the Forlì Campus of the University of Bologna and to local research and technology centres.

== Education and research ==
Forlì hosts a campus of the University of Bologna. The Forlì Campus offers first- and second-cycle degree programmes in fields including international relations, economics, engineering, languages, sociology and medicine. Aerospace engineering is offered at both bachelor's and master's level, with the master's programme taught in English.

The city is also home to an aerospace and technology-oriented research ecosystem linked to the university campus and local technology centres.

== Transport ==
Forlì railway station is on the Bologna–Ancona railway. The present station was opened in 1926, replacing the original station that had served the city since 1861. It remains a major railway stop on the Adriatic route, with regional and long-distance services.

Forlì Airport (Luigi Ridolfi Airport) is located south-west of the city. After being closed in 2013, the airport resumed commercial operations in 2020 and continues to operate scheduled services. In the summer 2026 season, routes include London, Cagliari and Palermo.

== Notable people ==
Forlì has been associated with a number of notable artists, scientists, politicians, musicians and sportspeople.

- Alice, Italian singer and winner of the Sanremo Music Festival;
- Marco Sabiu, musician and composer;
- Ercole Baldini, cyclist and 1958 world road race champion;
- Ilario Bandini, constructor of sports and racing cars;
- Pietro Bandini, missionary to Italian immigrants in the United States;
- Flavio Biondo, Renaissance historian and humanist;
- Giovanni Battista Cirri, cellist and composer;
- Ignazio Cirri, organist and composer;
- Alessandro Cortini, musician and member of Nine Inch Nails;
- Maria Farneti, opera singer;
- Cesare Hercolani, politician;
- Peregrine Laziosi, religious figure and saint;
- Pietro Leoni, Catholic priest and survivor of the Gulag;
- Gino Mattarelli, politician;
- Giovanni Battista Morgagni, physician and anatomist;
- Romano Mussolini, musician and youngest son of Benito Mussolini;
- Loris Reggiani, motorcycle road racer;
- Girolamo Riario, lord of Forlì in the late 15th century;
- Aurelio Saffi, politician of the Risorgimento;
- Caterina Sforza, ruler of Forlì from 1488 to 1499–1500;
- Giulietta Simionato, operatic mezzo-soprano;
- Vincenzo Sospiri, racing driver;
- Matteo Montaguti, professional cyclist.

Forlì was also home to several leading Renaissance painters, including Melozzo da Forlì, Ansuino da Forlì, Marco Palmezzano, and Francesco Menzocchi, who are associated with the Forlivese school of art.

== International relations ==
=== Twin towns – sister cities ===
Forlì is twinned with:

- Aveiro, Portugal
- Bourges, France
- Peterborough, United Kingdom
- Szolnok, Hungary
- Płock, Poland
- Elektrėnai, Lithuania
- Foggia, Italy

The municipality maintains an administrative unit responsible for relations with twin and partner cities and for international cooperation projects.

== In popular culture ==
- Somerset Maugham's second novel, The Making of a Saint (1898), is set in late 15th-century Forlì under Girolamo Riario.
- Forlì is featured in the 2009 video game Assassin's Creed II, in which Ezio Auditore travels to the city and encounters Caterina Sforza.

== See also ==
- Forlivese school of art
- ATRIUM
- Battle of Forlì
- Verzocchi collection
