= Camillo Capelli =

Italian painter

Camillo Capelli, also called Camillo Mantovano (active 16th century), was an Italian painter of the Renaissance period in northern Italy, including Pesaro and Venice.

== Biography ==
His father, a painter, was putatively born in Mirandola. The birth date is unknown, but he was likely born in Mantua. In addition to his father, he appears to have worked under Francesco Genga the Elder, and worked under the patronage of Isabella Gonzaga in Mantua.

In the 1530s, under the guidance of Genga, Camillo was one of the painters, along with Francesco Menzocchi and Raffaellino del Colle to decorate with landscape and floral decoration the Villa Imperiale of Pesaro. The exact fresco is not defined, but this work was notable by Giorgio Vasari.

Probably in 1539, along with Menzocchi, as well as Giuseppe and Francesco Salviati, he moved to Venice, where he helped decorate the Palazzo Grimani a Santa Maria Formosa. According to Vasari, he painted the floral wall decorations. In 1547, his sister married in Venice the engraver Niccolò Boldrini. Camillo died in Venice on 13 October 1568.
