= Zulian family =

Noble family

Zulian Zuliani
- noble family
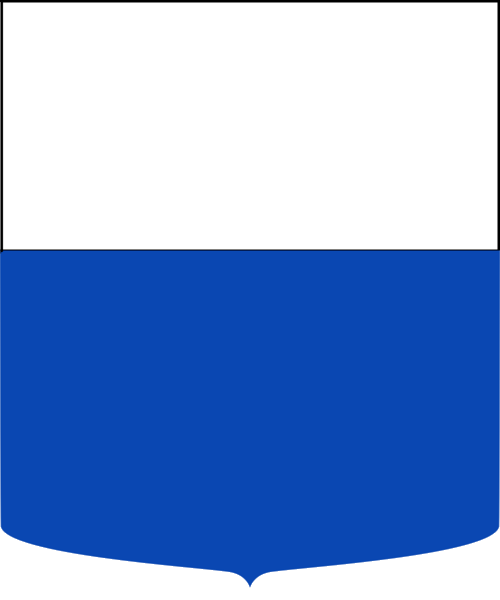
- Coat of Arms
- Country: Republic of Venice, Italy
- Founded: 5th century

The Zulian family (or Zuliani) was an old Venetian noble family. The place from whence the Zulian came to Venice is unclear; however, the family is considered one of the first that moved to Venice, and thus one of the oldest Venetian and Italian noble families. The family produced tribunes, and in the early 8th century gained dukedom, as a family member rose to the position of Maestro dei cavalieri. The family produced several prominent Venetian figures, including statesmen, generals, patrons and magnates.

== History ==
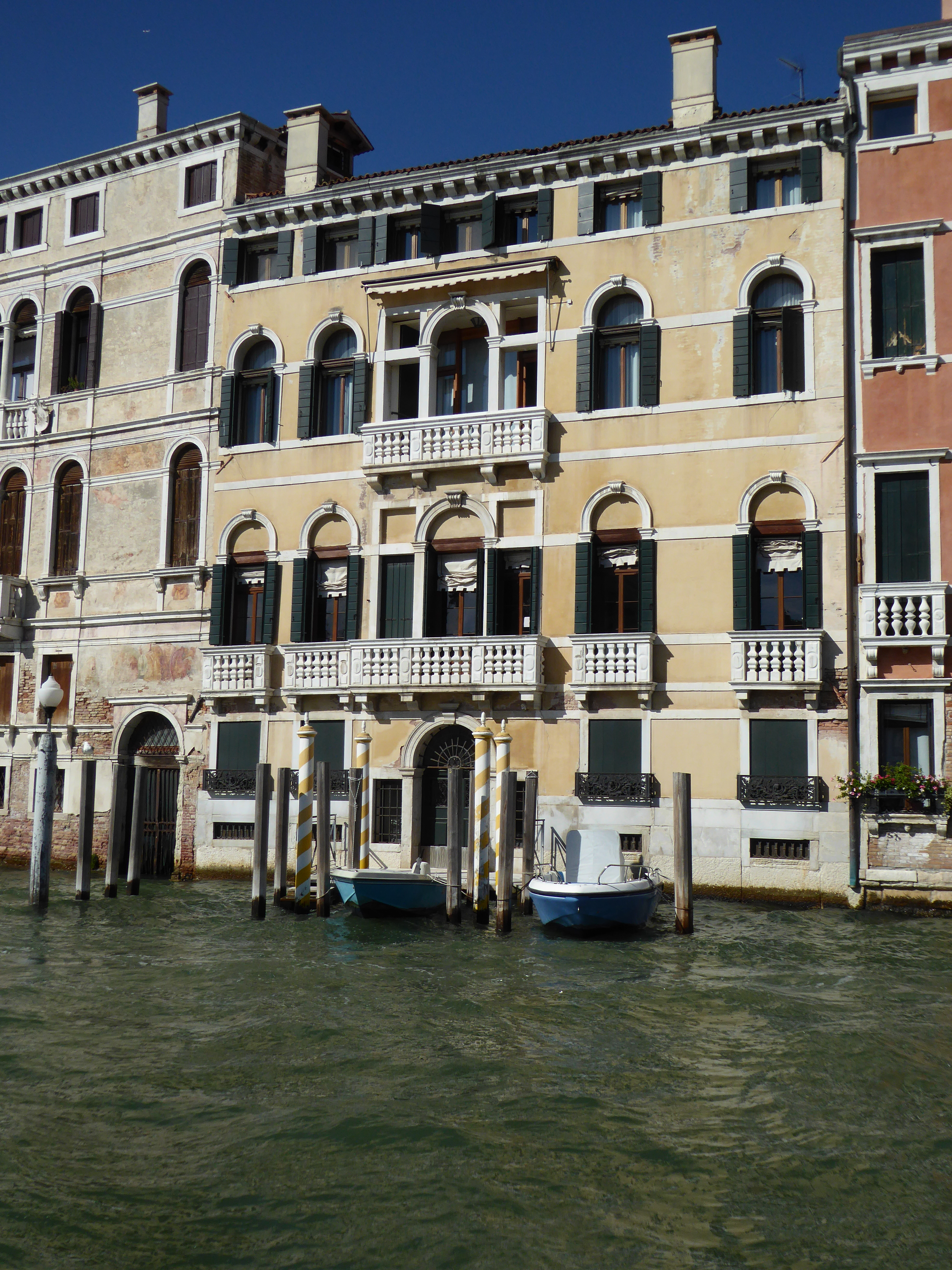
Façade of Palazzo Zulian Priuli on Canal Grande, Venice

The origins of the Zulian (Zuliani) are unclear, as historians provide conflicting reports. Nonetheless, their old, or rather ancient origin is evident, as the family produced tribunes. The family appears to be one of the oldest in Venice. They produced a Maestro dei cavalieri (Master of the Knights) in 741, an office which was instituted at the time as an equivalent to the title of Duke.

Likewise, the family set their abode in Santa Fosca since early times. Indeed, as reported by Marco Barbaro, Marco Zulian, who in 1120 built the monastery and the Church of Santa Maria della Carità, came from Santa Fosca. A Francesco and Polo Zulian, mentioned in 1379 in documents of the comune, were also from Santa Fosca. Polo (or Paolo) Zulian, already a renowned figure in Venice due to several ambassadorships, was elected Duke of Candia in 1382, but declined out of modesty. In 1410, Polo became Procurator of Saint Mark.

Polo's nephew, Andrea, translated Cassius Dio into Latin, and left several orations, for which he was praised by Flavio Biondo in his magnum opus Italia illustrata (Italy Illuminated).

In 1439, another Andrea Zulian valiantly defended the Castelvecchio of Verona from the attacks of Condottiero Niccolò Piccinino, who had surprised the city.

The Zulian lived in Santa Fosca up to the 18th century. In the 17th century they erected the Palazzo Zulian on the Canal Grande. They probably built the palace over a pre-existing building owned by them, as the family is registered in the estimo of the Contrada of Santa Fosca since 1379. Girolamo Zulian left the palace to the Priuli of Sts. Gervasius and Protasius, bequeathing it to them in the will he drew up on August 2, 1794.

Cavaliere Girolamo Zulian was a famed ambassador and patron of the arts, who today is best remembered for his art collection, which he donated to the city of Venice in 1795, and for having been one of Canova's earliest patrons; commissioning from him the Theseus and the Minotaur in 1781, and greatly contributing to the Venetian's rise to fame. Girolamo Zulian was Savio di Terraferma, Senator, Correttore, Counsellor of Cannaregio and San Marco, Savio of the Council of Ten, and Savio del Consiglio. He later became Venetian ambassador to Rome and then bailo to Constantinople. Girolamo Zulian was a Knight of the Stola d'oro.

=== Zuliani of Ceneda ===
A group of Zuliani (spelled Zuliani) were nobles residing in Ceneda. In 1830 they are said to have been part of the Consiglio nobile di Ceneda for four generations. In 1745 they acquired the fief of Cesana and were created counts there. The family was confirmed noble by royal decree on October 28, 1823.

=== Zuliani of Porta di ferro ===
The Zulian brothers Francesco and Matteo, born March 11, 1772, and December 9, 1773, made iron gates which earned them to add Porta di ferro to their name, and the title of Counts of Ceneda for them and all their descendants. Austrian Emperor Francis I confirmed the Zuliani Porta di Ferro as Counts of Ceneda. In 1830, they had been part of the Corporazione nobile di Ceneda (Noble Corporation of Ceneda) for four generations. They were great landowners and lumber merchants. They resided in Perarolo, in the Province of Belluno, and in 1720 were bestowed the titles of Cavalieri aurati and Counts palatine by official decree of Francesco Trevisan, Bishop of Ceneda, following approval by Pope Clement XI. The Zuliani Porta di Ferro were confirmed noble by royal decree on October 28, 1823. The Zuliani Porta di Ferro owned the Villa Doria De Zuliani in Noventa, which today is part of the Metropolitan City of Venice. The Zuliani came to Noventa from Belluno at the end of the 1700s.

== Surname and coat of arms ==
Zulian/Zuliani derives from Medieval Latin Zulianus, an archaic form of Julian (Italian: Giuliano), attested, for example, in a 12th-century investiture in Brescia. Zulianus was based on the Roman name and cognomen Julianus, derived from the gentile name Julius. The arms of Zulian consist of a spaccato of argent (white) and blue (spaccato d'argento e d'azzurro).
