= Polo Zuliani =

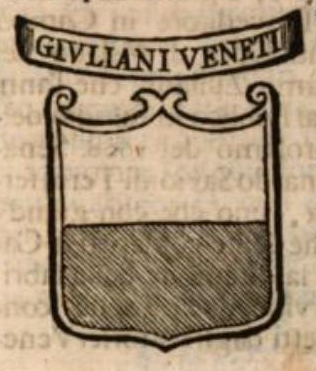
- Arms of Zuliani

Duke of Candia
- In office 1382–1382

Personal details
- Born: 14th century
- Died: after 1410

Paolo "Polo" Zuliani (also Zulian) was a Venetian nobleman, statesman, and Duke-elect of Candia, who is remembered for having declined the title of Duke of Candia out of modesty upon his election in 1382.

== Biography ==
He was born into the Zuliani family, a Venetian patrician family. He is recorded in the 1379 estimo of the comune together with sier Franscesco Zulian. He is said to have been from Santa Fosca (Cannaregio), which was the historical abode of the Zuliani.

Zuliani was a very prominent (notissimo) figure in Venice, due to several ambassadorships. Zuliani was among the twelve ambassadors sent to Istria to meet with Doge Antonio Venier. He was elected Duke of Candia in 1382, but declined out of modesty. Ireneo della Croce called this a "rare example of modesty" (esempio raro di modestia).

In 1410, Zuliani was elected Procurator of Saint Mark.

== Relative ==
His nephew (or grandson) Andrea was an author and translator. Andrea translated Cassius Dio into Latin and left several orations, for which he was praised by Flavio Biondo in his Italia illustrata (Italy Illuminated).

Political offices
Preceded by Pietro Morosini	Duke of Candia; 1382–1382	Succeeded by Tommaso Mocenigo
