= Girolamo Zulian =

Venetian ambassador

Cavaliere Girolamo Zulian
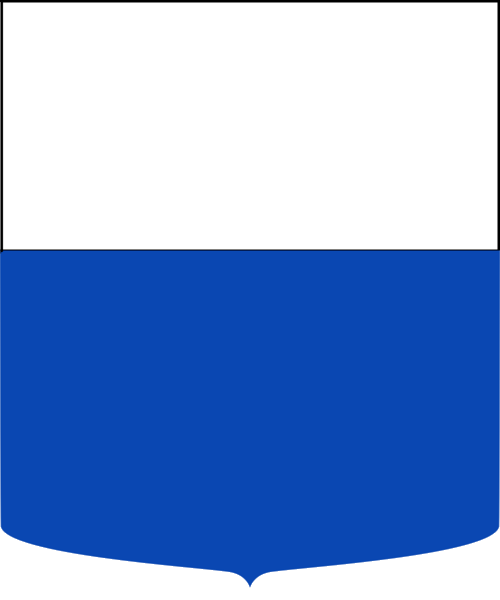
- Arms of Zulian

Venetian ambassador to the Holy See
- In office 1777–1783
- Monarch: Paolo Renier

Bailo of Constantinople
- In office 1783–1789

Personal details
- Born: Girolamo Zulian; 1730 Venice, Republic of Venice
- Died: 1795 (aged 64–65) Venice, Republic of Venice
- Spouse: ?

Cavaliere Girolamo Zulian (1730–1795) was a Venetian nobleman, ambassador, patron of the arts, art collector and Senatore Amplissimo. A member of the House of Zulian, he is best known for his leading art collection and for being one of the earliest patrons of Canova, a great friend of his, from whom he commissioned the Theseus and the Minotaur in 1781, while serving as ambassador to Rome. Zulian is credited as having played a fundamental role in Canova's rise to fame.

== Biography ==
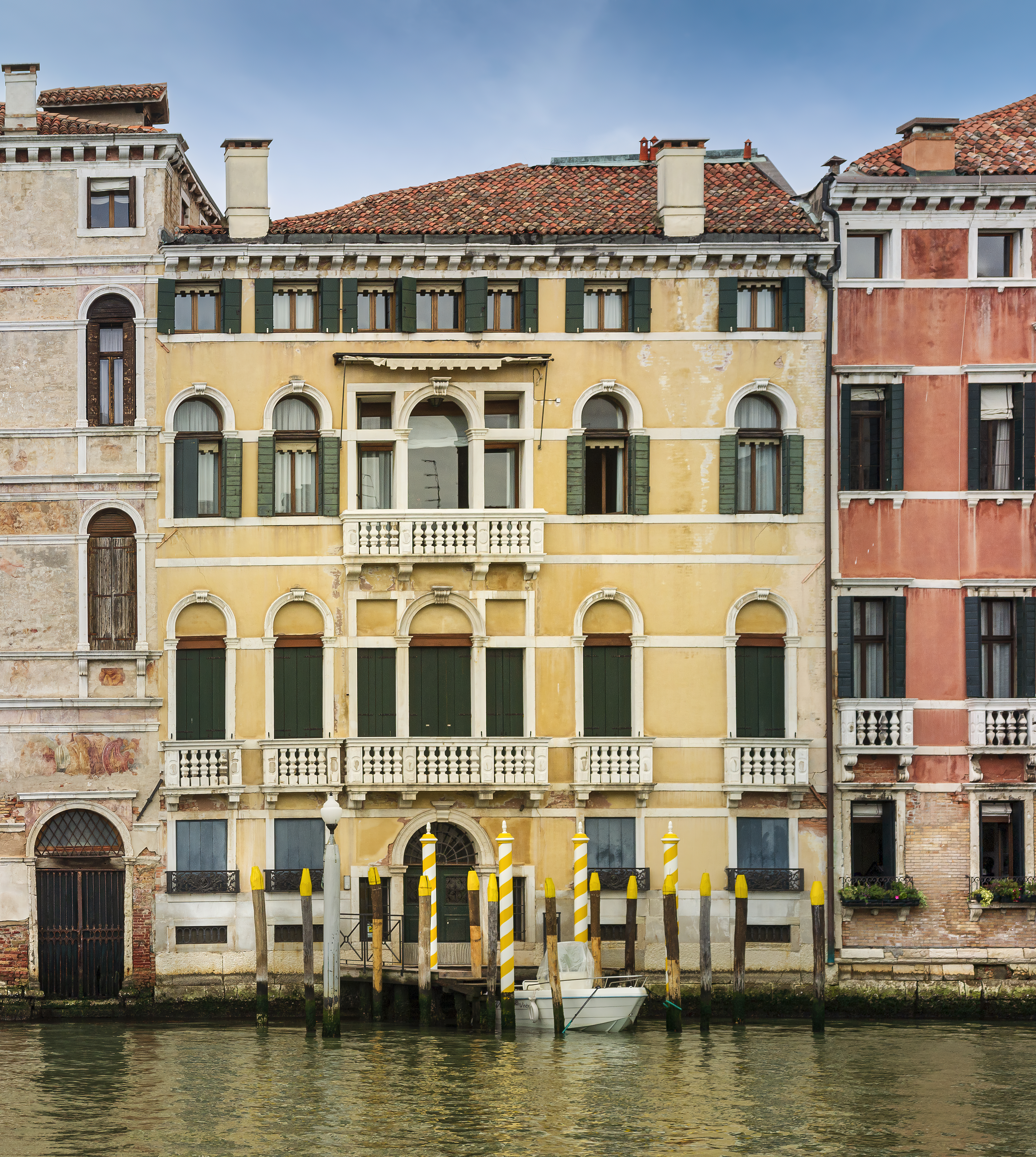
Façade of Palazzo Zulian Priuli on Canal Grande, Venice

Zulian was born in Venice, the Republic of Venice, in 1730. He was born into an influential old Venetian noble family, which built the Palazzo Zulian on Venice's Canal Grande in the 17th century. Girolamo Zulian bequeathed the palazzo to the Priuli of San Trovaso (or Sts. Gervasius and Protasius), as specified in his will drawn up on August 2, 1794. Further, part of Zulian's art collection passed to the Priuli.

Zulian is said to have been an extremely clever man, who, for all being neither an artist nor a scholar, used his power and wealth to promote and protect the arts. Zulian went on to become Savio di Terraferma and Senator. He was one of the Correttori delle leggi elected together with Lodovico Flangini and Alvise Elmo in 1774. Zulian was also ducal councillor of Cannaregio and San Marco, Savio (senior magistrate) of the Council of Ten, and Savio del Consiglio. He later became Venetian ambassador to the Holy See, and later still bailo to Constantinople. Zulian was a Knight of the Order of the Golden Stole.

=== Patron of Canova ===
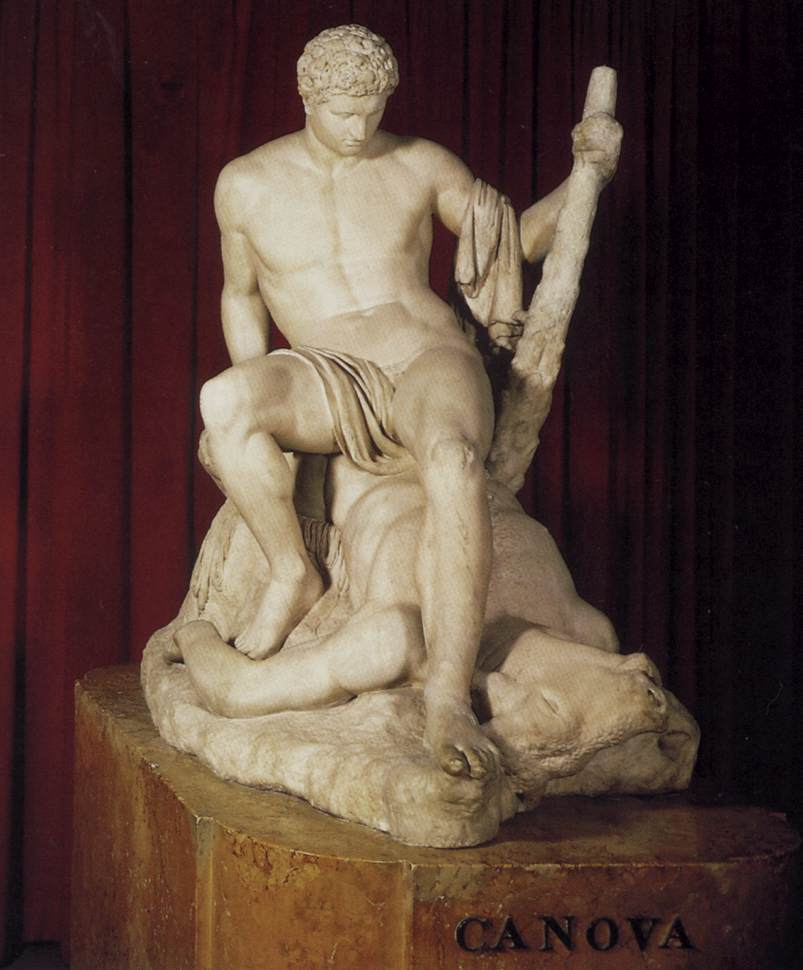
The Theseus and the Minotaur commissioned by Zulian, Victoria and Albert Museum, London

In 1777, Zulian became ambassador to Rome. Shortly after, Canova moved there on a study trip financed by the state. Zulian took Canova under his patronage and protection, and significantly helped him in Rome, welcoming him as his guest and allowing him to turn some rooms of his palace into his studio. In 1781, Zulian commissioned the Theseus and the Minotaur from Canova, one of Canova's earliest works after settling in Rome. This sculpture greatly contributed to advancing Canova's career. According to Giuseppe Tambroni, it is to this statue and Zulian's trust in Canova that the beginning of the latter's glory might be ascribed. Canova had been criticized in Rome at first. However, Zulian decided not to listen to his first judge and instead trusted the counsel of Hamilton, who had approved of Canova's work.

Zulian also gave Canova the marble block for Theseus. He left the choice of subject for this commission to Canova. It was Canova's friend Gavin Hamilton who suggested Theseus and the slaughtered Minotaur from Ovid's Metamorphoses to him. The subject is also intended as an Enlightenment allegory of reason triumphing over irrationality.

Zulian also commissioned a map of Padua from Giovanni Volpato (the famous Pianta di Padova) while in Rome. He donated the original to the Padua Academy, which named him an honorary member, and to which he made other donations in the years, including an ancient tablet discovered by Fortis, which confirmed the existence of the cult of Isis in Albano, and a bust of Cardinal Bembo. Zulian also commissioned a bust of Torquato Tasso from Giuseppe Angelini during his embassy in Rome, which he donated to his friend Pierantonio Serassi.

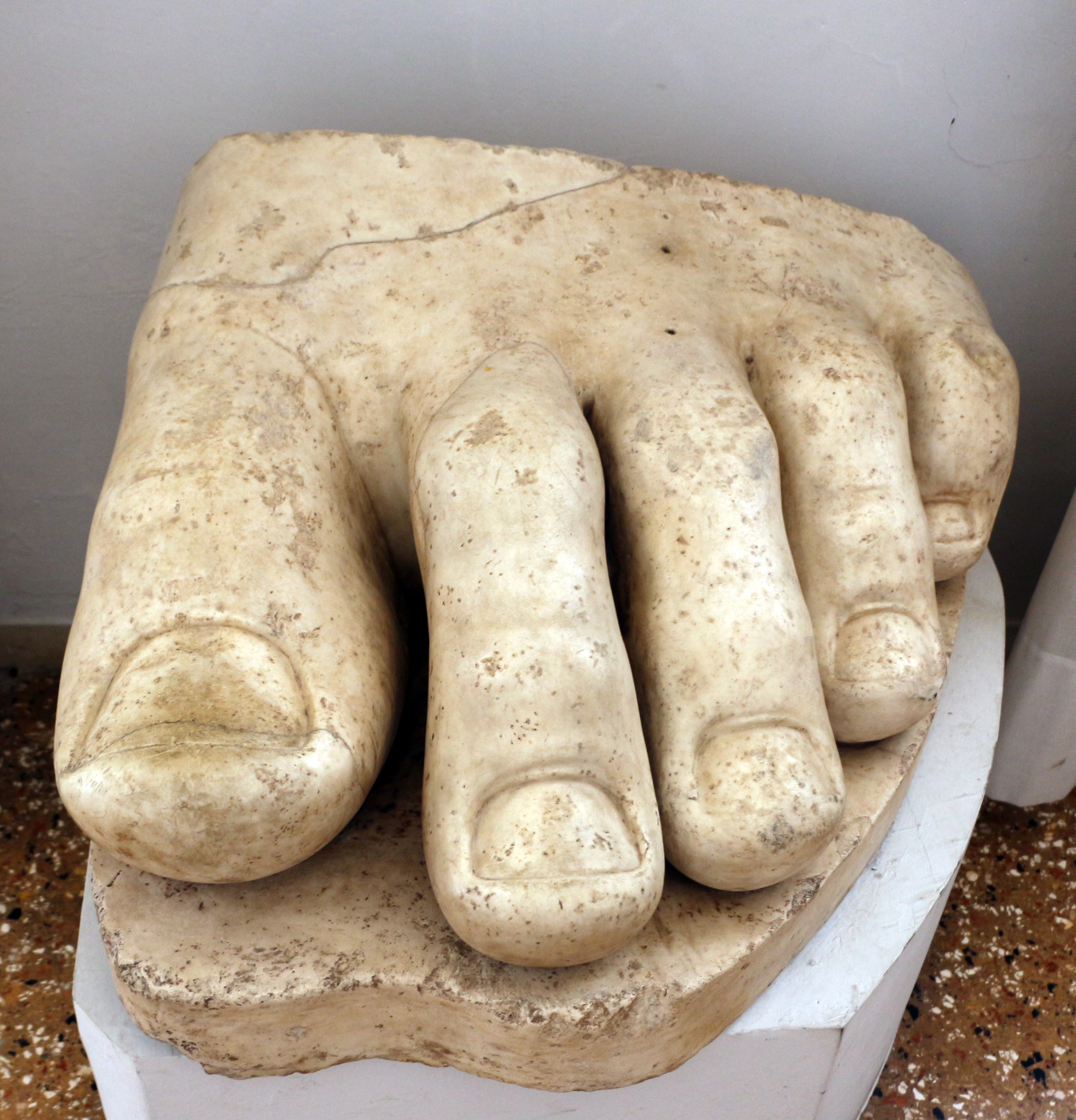
The Mezzo piede di un Colosso brought by Zulian to Venice and restored by Canova, National Archaeological Museum, Venice

Zulian, following the advice of Canova, transferred a well-known sculpture, the Mezzo piede di un Colosso, to Venice a few years before 1785. Foreseeing the hard times which were to befall Venice, Zulian transferred three other important sculptures to Venice, that is the pair Teste di satiro e satiressa and a relief of Mithras killing a bull. Zulian asked his friend Canova, whom he had much helped in Rome, to restore the sculptures. Canova is known for his unavailability to restore sculptures, however, he made an exception for his friend, the ambassador, and quickly answered that he would complete the restoration of the marbles. Canova wrote:

Dopo pranso l'Ambasciatore mi mando' con Selva a vedere il pié che sta nel cortile per andare dal Segretario perché lo vedessi, avendo piaccere che fosse accomodatto; io lo vidi e gli risposi che l'accomoderò.

The sculptures are today in the Venice National Archaeological Museum. Zulian donated them to the institution in 1795.

=== The Cammeo Zulian ===
When he was elected bailo and was shipping out to Costantinople, Zulian was followed by Alberto Fortis, a prominent naturalist, the Neapolitan botanist Domenico Cirillo, and the French scholar Jean Baptiste LeChevalier. Zulian was not satisfied with only having those learned men making their studies under him, so that he himself made several excursions during his legateship; excursions whose purpose was "collecting as many monuments as Zulian could put his hands on." It was during one of these excursions that he collected the well-known Cammeo Zulian, a Hellenistic-era intaglio of Giove Egioco, today in the Venice National Archaeological Museum. The Cammeo was probably recovered in Ephesus, and, according to other sources, it was presented to ambassador Zulian as a gift. The Cammeo achieved instant fame and was described by art historians Carlo Bianconi and Ennio Quirino Visconti. Visconti's description, which appears in his Opere varie, was commissioned by Zulian himself and originally printed in Padua in 2026.

Even before coming back from Costantinople, Zulian was already planning to restore the house of the poet Petrarch in Arquà, although the project didn't materialize.

Zulian died in 1795, leaving to the public Library of Saint Mark a part of his collection, which included his Cammeo.

== The Zulian Collection ==
Zulian, a man of fine taste and knowledgeable in the arts, put together a valuable collection of artworks, which he kept in Padua, his habitual city of residence. Among the most precious pieces of Zulian's collection, there were sculptures and rare carved gems, collected by him in Rome, Alexandria, and along the Anatolian coast during his time as bailo to the Turkish sovereign. Zulian died just before the fall of the Republic. His collection, bequeathed by him to the city of Venice, was spared auctioning and dispersion, a fate which befell most local collections.

== Sources ==
- Materassi, Luisa (2002). Girolamo Zulian: the collection, the man and his world.
- De Paoli, Marcella (2008). La raccolta di antichità di Girolamo Zulian. Una collezione neoclassica veneziana.
- M. De Paoli, Il legato Zulian, 1795, in I. Favaretto, G. L. Ravagnan (a cura di), Lo Statuario Pubblico della Serenissima. Due secoli di collezionismo di antichità 1596–1797, Cittadella (Padova) 1997, 282–298.
- M. De Paoli, Antonio Canova e il «museo» Zulian. Vicende di una collezione veneziana della seconda metà del Settecento, "Ricerche di Storia dell'Arte" 66 (1998), 19–36.
- M. De Paoli, Le gemme di Girolamo Zulian, in L. Dolcini, B. Zanettin (a cura di), Cristalli e gemme. Realtà fisica e immaginario, simbologia, tecniche e arte, Catalogo della mostra (Venezia, Palazzo Loredan, 28 aprile-24 maggio 1999), Venezia 1999, 89–102.
