= Francesco Menzocchi =

Italian painter

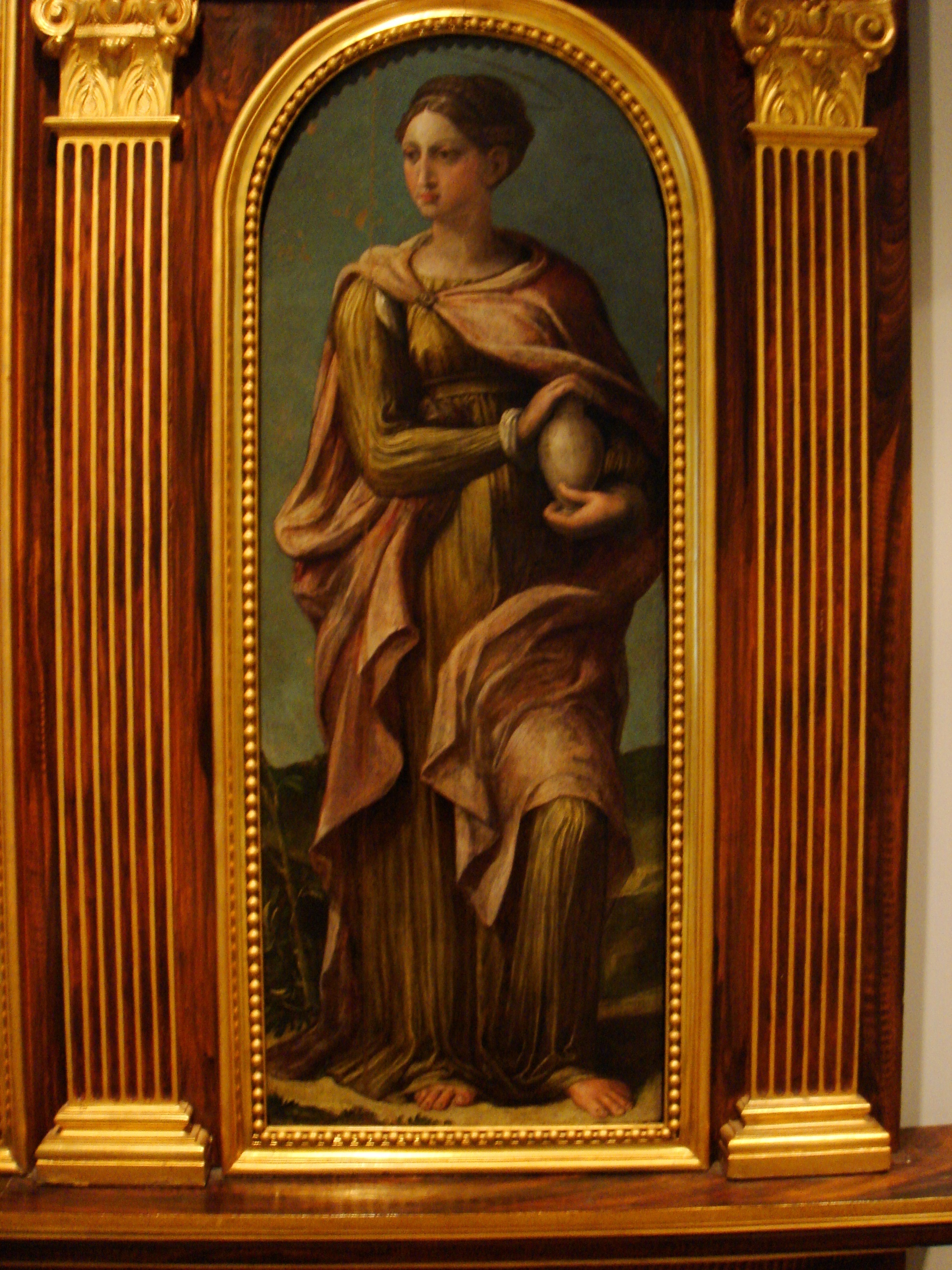
Francesco Menzocchi, Mary Magdalene, ca. 1535. National Museum of San Marino

Francesco Menzocchi (1502–1574) was an Italian painter of the late-Renaissance and Mannerist period. He was born in Forlì, belonged to the Forlì painting school and was active mainly in Forlì and Pesaro.

Menzocchi was also called il Vecchio di San Bernardo. He apprenticed first with painter Marco Palmegiani, and later Girolamo Genga. He worked under the latter in the Villa Imperiale of Pesaro, where he would influence Raffaellino del Colle. He frescoed the Sacrifice of Melchisedec and the Miracle of the Manna for the chapel of San Francesco di Paula in the Basilica of Loreto. At Forlì, he painted a Trinity for the church of Santa Maria della Grata. His sons, Pier Paolo, and Sebastiano, were also painters. In Venice, he made four paintings for the wooden ceiling of the room dedicated to Psyche of Palazzo Grimani in Santa Maria Formosa (1539–40), that unfortunately no longer exists . His biography was featured in the Vite by Giorgio Vasari.
