= Giovanni Grimani =

Italian bishop

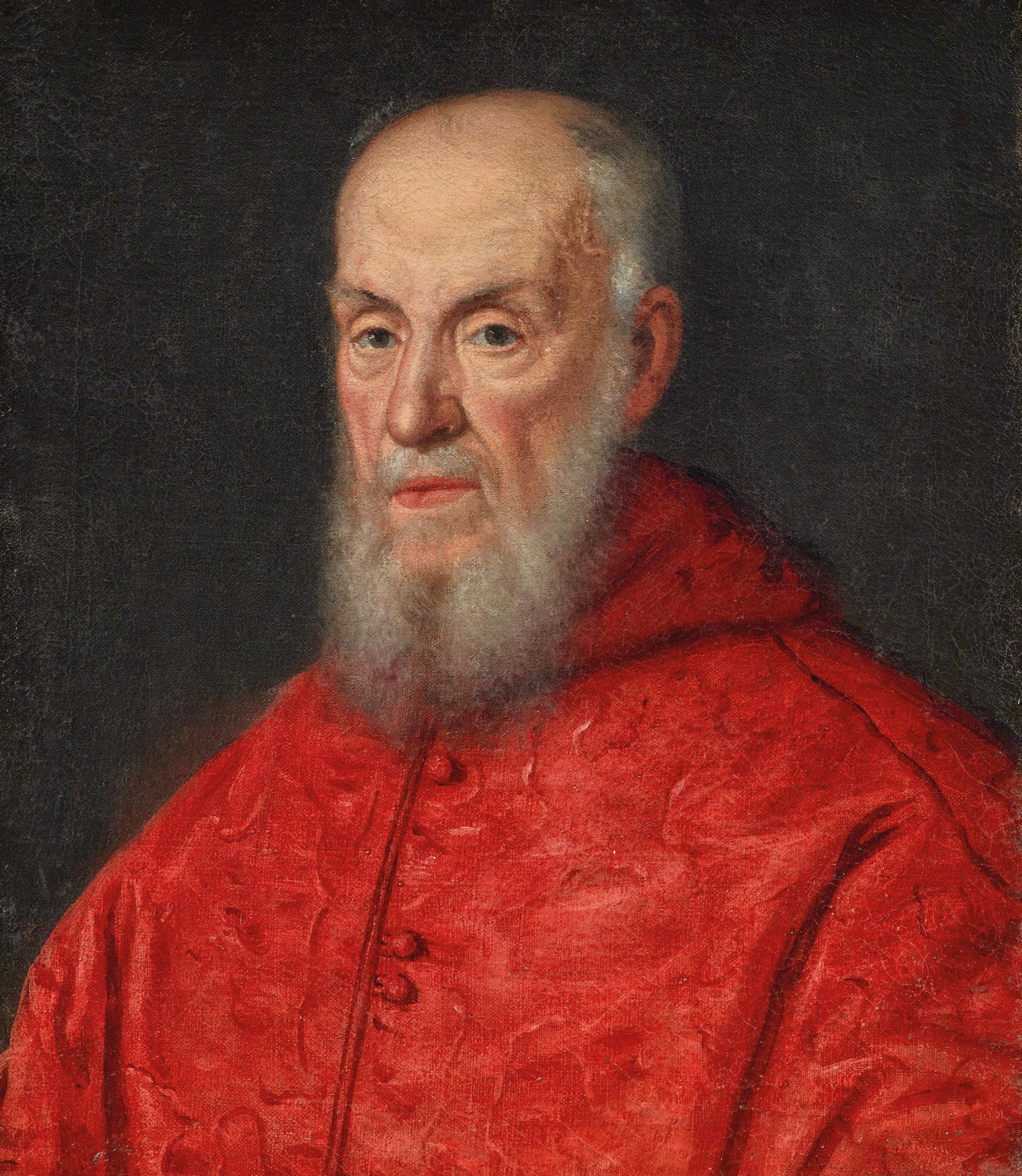
Portrait of Giovanni Grimani (workshop of Jacopo and Domenico Tintoretto.

Giovanni VI Grimani (8 July 1506, Venice - 3 October 1593, Venice) was an Italian bishop and patriarch of Aquileia.

== Life ==
Nephew of Cardinal Domenico Grimani, brother of Marino Grimani and a member of the Venetian noble family of the Grimani, he was the fourth son of Gerolamo Grimani and Elena Priuli. He was bishop of Ceneda from 1520 to 1531 and from 1540 to 1545.

He served as patriarch of Aquileia between 1545 and 1550 and 1585 and 1593. As patriarch he initiated two diocesan synods in 1565 and 1584. He was not made a cardinal since he was suspected of welcoming some Lutheran ideas contrary to Catholic orthodoxy. He defended himself in person against these accusations at the Council of Trent in 1563.

An educated man and keen collector of classical art, he also commissioned the expansion of the Palazzo Grimani di Santa Maria Formosa, in which he gathered important artworks. He also promoted cultural development in the city.

== Bibliography ==
- Pio Paschini, Giovanni Grimani accusato d'eresia, in Pio Paschini, Tre illustri prelati del Rimascimento. Ermolao Barbaro, Adriano Castellesi, Giovanni Grimani, Facultas theologica Pontifici Athenaei Lateranensis, 1957, pp. 133–196
