= Palazzo Grimani di Santa Maria Formosa =

State museum in Venice, Italy

Museo di Palazzo Grimani
- Palazzo Grimani di Santa Maria Formosa
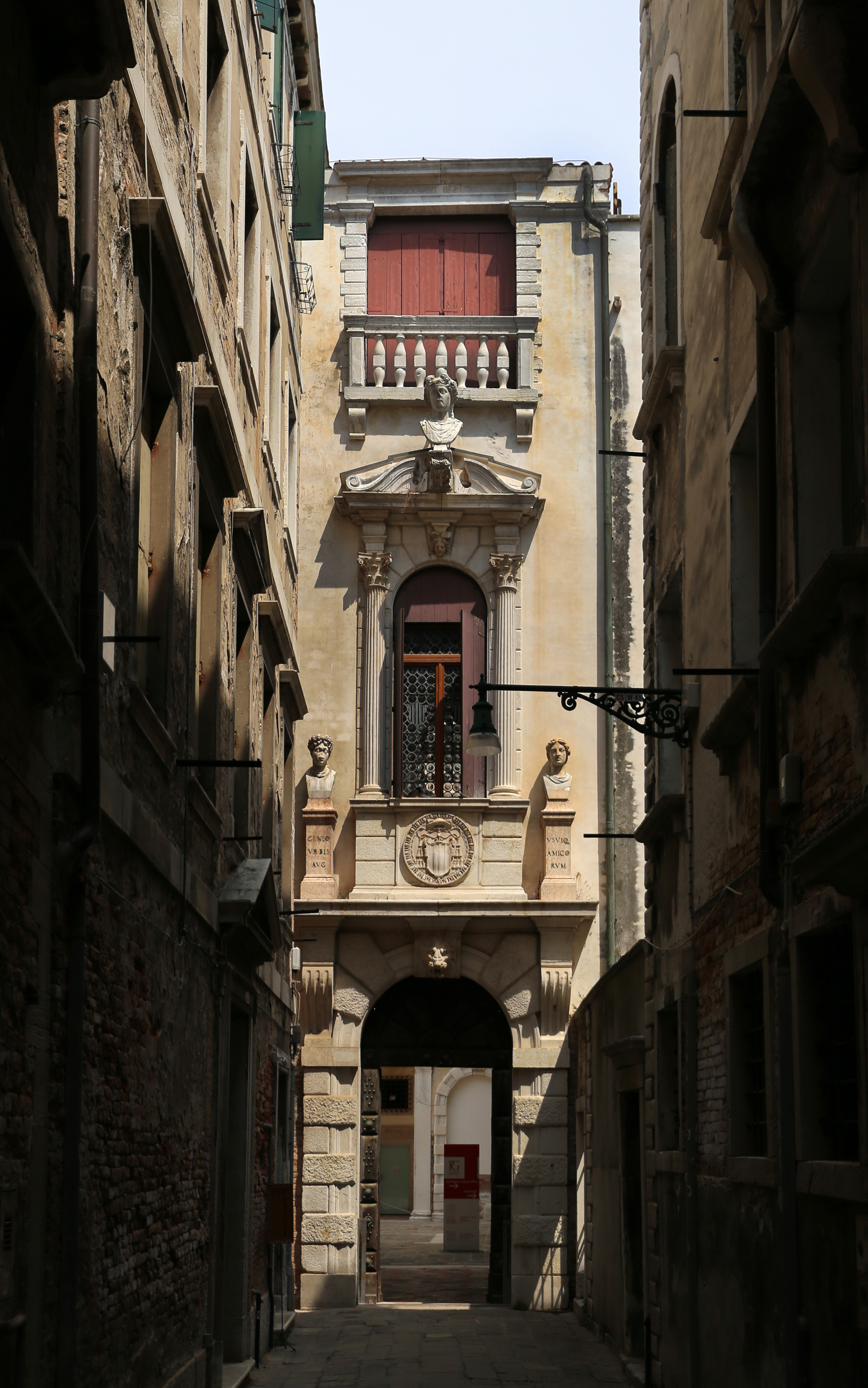
- Location: Venice, Italy
- Coordinates: 45°26′13″N 12°20′32″E
- Type: Art Museum
- Collection size: 3 item, 22 item
- Visitors: 11,260 (2020)
- Website: polomusealeveneto.beniculturali.it/musei/museo-di-palazzo-grimani

The Palazzo Grimani of Santa Maria Formosa is a State museum, located in Venice in the Castello district, near Campo Santa Maria Formosa.

== History ==
The palace can be reached by land from Ruga Giuffa. The water entry, used in ancient times, is located on the San Severo canal. The original medieval building was built at the confluence of the canals of San Severo and Santa Maria Formosa, and purchased later by Antonio Grimani, who became a doge in 1521, and subsequently passed on as a legacy, in the third decade of the 16th century, to the grandsons Vettore Grimani, Procurator de Supra for the Venetian Republic, and Giovanni Grimani, Patriarch of Aquileia, who refurbished the old structure inspired by architectural models taken from classicism. The two brothers wanted to give "modern" forms to the building and had it decorated with fresco cycles and elegant stucco. In 1558, at the death of Vettore, Giovanni became the sole owner of the building: he added an extension of the palace. Decorating the rooms were many artists including Federico Zuccari, architect of the monumental staircase, and Camillo Mantovano. The patriarch Giovanni Grimani set up his refined collection of antiques, including sculptures, marbles, vases, bronzes and gems, in the rooms of the palace. In 1587 he donated the collection of sculptures and gems to the Serenissima: after his death the first ones were placed in the anti-room of the Marciana Library and today they are the founding nucleus of the National Archaeological Museum of Venice.

Until 1865, it was property of the Santa Maria Formosa branch of the Grimani family. But the palace had deteriorated and passed through several owners, until in 1981 it was acquired by the Superintendence for Architectural and Environmental Heritage of the city of Venice and became state property. Opened to the public on December 20, 2008, after a long restoration, it is currently a museum belonging to the Veneto Museum Pole

The long restoration by the Superintendence included the interior decorations, including: the Camerino di Callisto, with stucco by Giovanni da Udine; the Camerino di Apollo, with frescoes by Francesco Salviati and Giovanni da Udine; the Sala del Doge Antonio, decorated with stucco and polychrome marbles; the Sala a Fogliami by Camillo Mantovano, with the ceiling entirely covered with fruit trees, flowers and animals; and the Tribune that once housed more than a hundred pieces of the archaeological collection. Here, the sculpture depicting the Kidnapping of Ganimede is suspended in the center of the vault that is decorated with lacunae. Federico Zuccari is probably also responsible for the stucco decoration with the grotesque monster with its wide open mouth visible in the Sala del Camino. Other works exhibited in the museum refer to the collections of the Grimani family. In the Sala di Psiche is an antique copy of Salviati's Adoration of Psyche, originally lodged in the middle of the wooden ceiling that was dismembered in the mid-nineteenth century. The second floor of the building houses temporary exhibitions and cultural events.

== Temporary exhibitions ==
The following temporary exhibitions were set up (all until November 27, 2022):

- "Domus Grimani 1594-2019. The collection of classical sculptures in the palace after four centuries"
- "Domus Grimani - The Doge's Room"
- "Archinto" by Georg Baselitz

== Main rooms ==
=== Courtyard ===
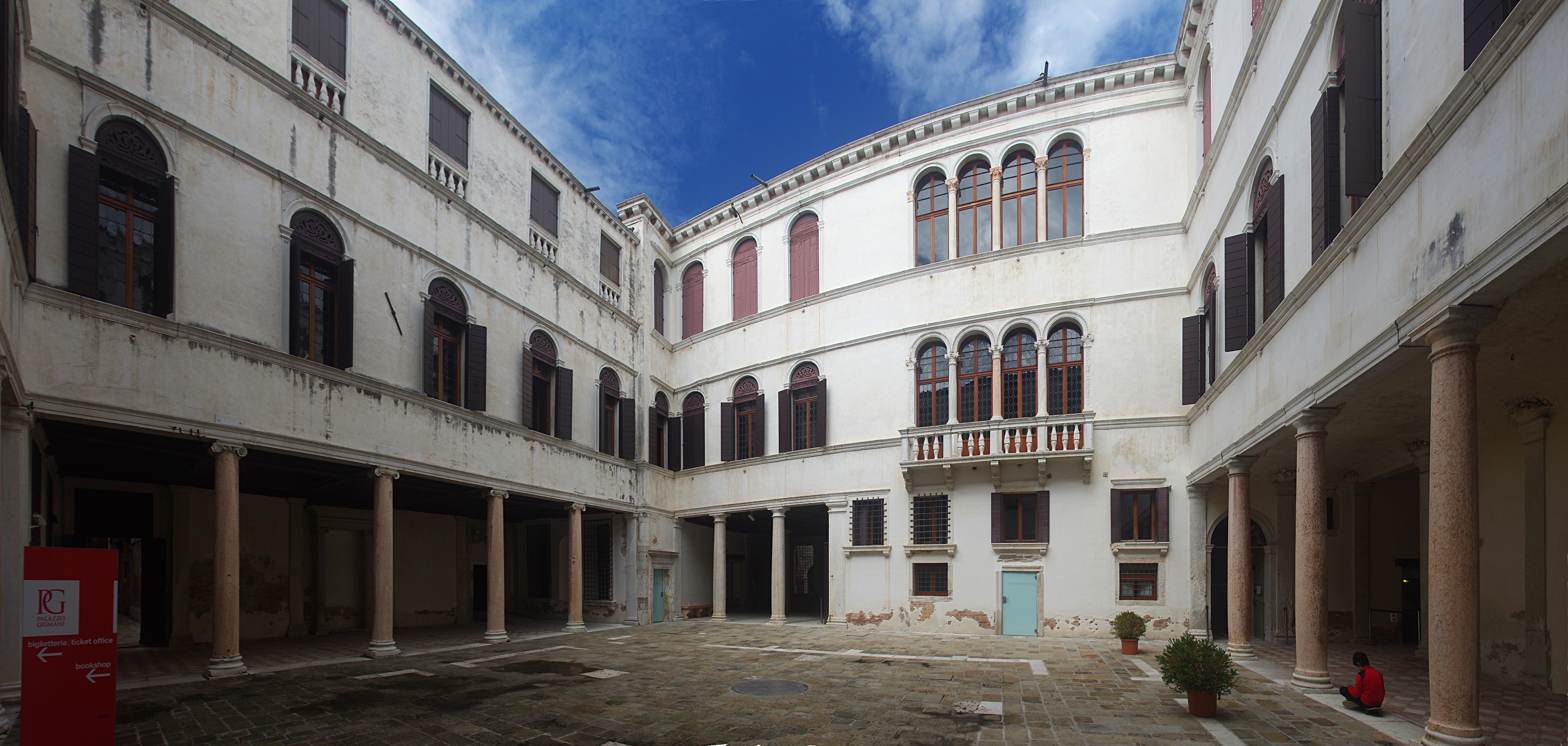
Courtyard

The marble entrance portal leads into the large courtyard. The original medieval building, an L-shape plan, was restructured and redecorated between 1537 and 1540 by brothers Vettore and Giovanni Grimani, according to a style inspired by the ancient Roman domus. In 1558, Giovanni patronized the addition of a further wing, enclosing in a square the central courtyard. The loggias that were created were adorned with classical statues. The loggia in front of the entrance of the museum was entirely frescoed with plant motifs and completed by the wonderful stucco baskets filled with fruits and vegetables.

=== Monumental staircase ===
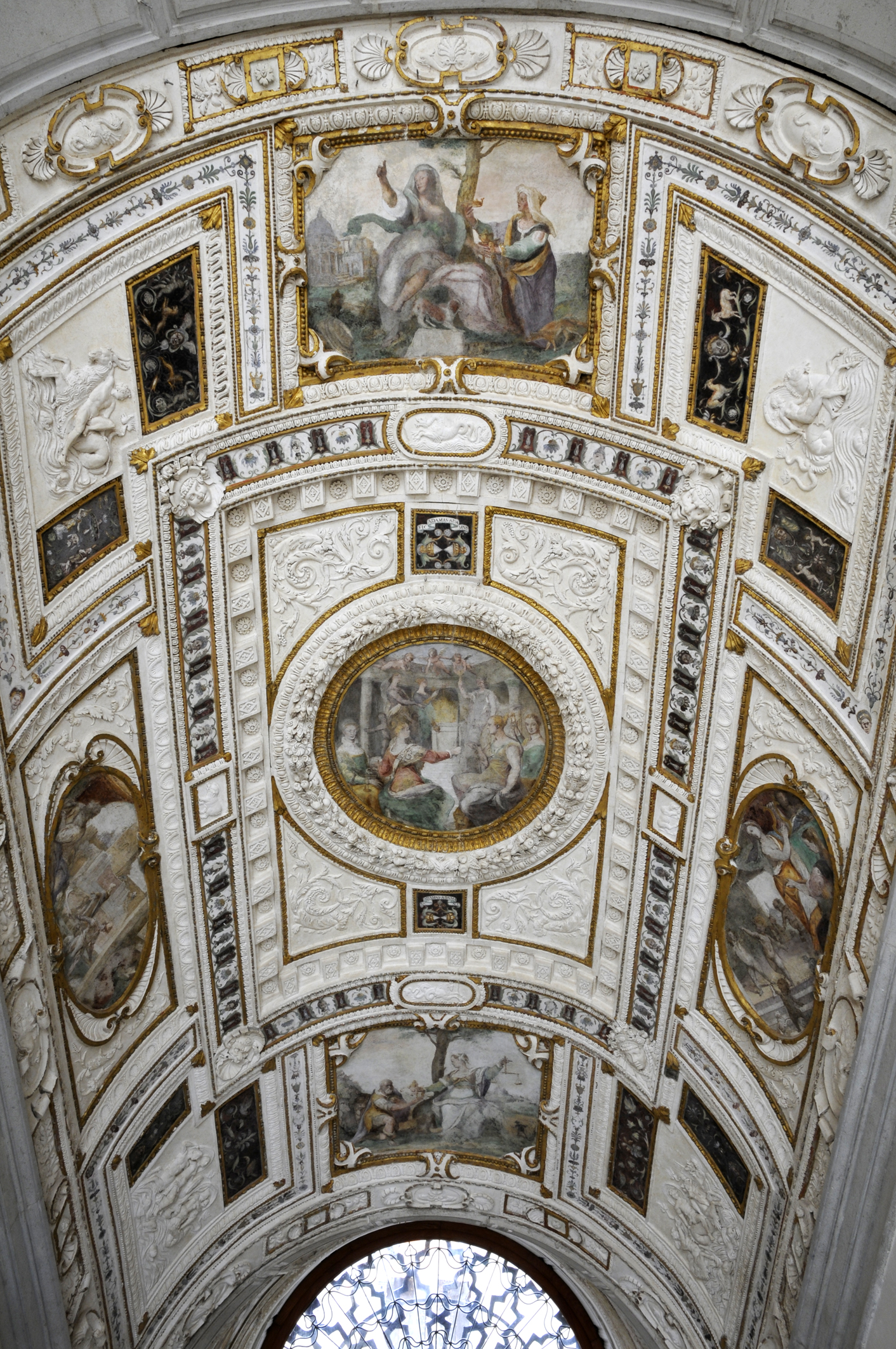
Monumental staircase

Between 1563 and 1565 the barrel vault of the staircase leading to the portego or passing salon of the main floor was sumptuously decorated by a young Federico Zuccari, who had trained in Rome, with allegorical frescoes referring to the virtues of his client Giovanni, completed by grotesques and stucco reliefs with mythological creatures. The stuccos reproduce some antique cameos from the Giovanni Grimani collection. Overall, the grand staircase bears comparing to the Scala d'Oro of Palazzo Ducale and with the entrance to the Marciana Library.

=== Camaron d'Oro ===
This room owes its name to the tapestries embellished with gold yarns that once covered the walls. Today we can admire some pieces from the collection of antiques by Giovanni Grimani, donated in 1587 to the Public Statuary of the Serenissima (now the National Archaeological Museum). The plaster statue of the Laocoon Group is an eighteenth-century plaster copy of an Ancient Roman sculpture in the Vatican museum; this plaster replica was collected by Cardinal Domenico Grimani.

=== Foliage room ===
The ceiling of the room, known as Sala a Fogliami or "Room of Foliage," was painted in the 1560s by Camillo Mantovano. It owes its name to a luxurious decoration of the ceiling with trees, plants and flowers: a forest inhabited by numerous animals, frequently with predatory attitudes, and rich in symbolic meanings. In the lunettes surmounted by grotesques, complex figurations in the form of a rebus possibly allude to the long and troubled heresy trial suffered by the patriarch Giovanni Grimani.

=== Tribuna ===
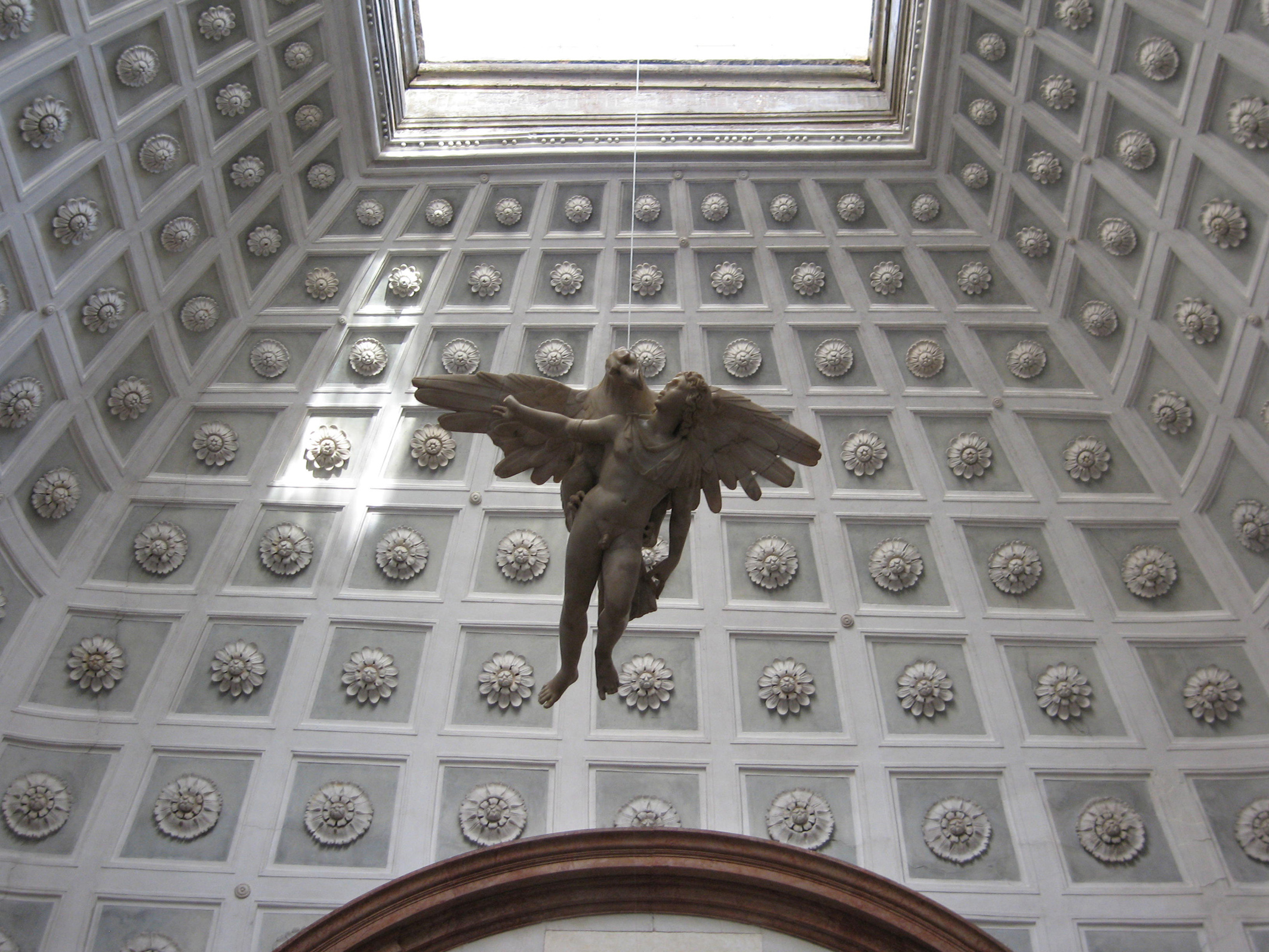
Tribuna - Rape of Ganymed

The Tribuna was also known as Antiquarium and originally housed more than one hundred and thirty ancient sculptures, among the finest of the collection. This extraordinary space, once closed on three sides, illuminated only from above and inspired by the Pantheon, was the fulcrum and the final destination of the itinerary along the rooms that precede it. The variety of sources of inspiration suggests a direct involvement of Giovanni Grimani himself in the design. The sculpture with the Abduction of Ganymede, hanging in the center of the room, is a Roman replica of a late Hellenistic model and has been relocated to its original position after the restoration of the building.

=== Neoclassical room ===
This room was renovated to be used as a bedroom for the wedding, celebrated in 1791, between the Roman princess Virginia Chigi and Giovanni Carlo Grimani. For this purpose a dressing room was created in the rooms behind the chimney wall. The decoration of the ceiling, executed by the Veronese Giovanni Faccioli, reproduces some pieces of ancient mural paintings (Aldobrandini Wedding and others from the Domus aurea). La Nuda is exhibited in this room. The work was part of the fresco cycle that Giorgione executed on the facade of the Fontego dei Tedeschi in 1508.

=== Dining room ===
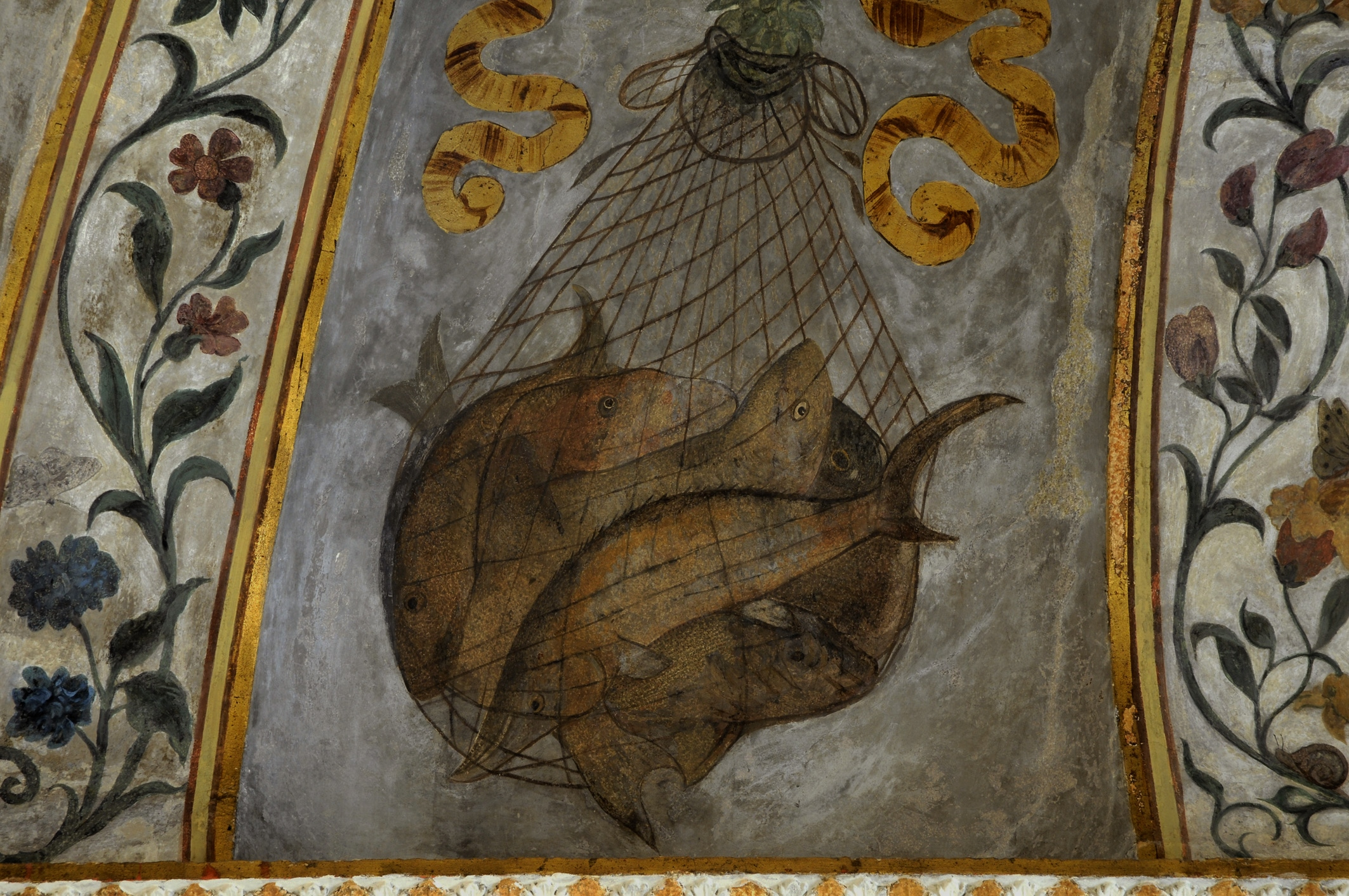
Camillo Mantovano, ceiling of the Dining room (part.)

The striking ceiling of this room, decorated with festoons with fowl, vegetables and fish, alternated with floral bands, was created by Camillo Mantovano and a collaborator around 1567. The compositional scheme, with the space divided into segments through rays that converge to center, proposes in a modern key a model used in a room of the Domus aurea. The seventeenth-century painting in the center of the ceiling, Saint John baptizing the crowd derives from the homonymous painting by Nicolas Poussin of the Louvre. According to the nineteenth-century guides, it would replace a painting attributed to Giorgione and depicting the Four Elements.

=== Room of the Doge Antonio, vestibule and chapel ===
These three rooms belong to the last building phase of the palace, which ended in 1568. In the chapel, used by the patriarch Giovanni Grimani for the private celebration of the mass, there is a 16th-century altarpiece attributed to Giovanni Contarini, placed instead of the marble altar which was removed in the nineteenth century. On the ceiling of the chapel and vestibule, short Latin inscriptions still recall the vicissitudes of the patriarch. From the vestibule window you can see the spiral staircase, probably a Palladian creation. In the next room, a plaque above the fireplace recalls and enhances the role of Antonio Grimani, to whom the room was dedicated. He was Giovanni's grandfather and Doge of the Serenissima from 1521 to 1523. To emphasize the importance of these three rooms, the walls and floors are entirely decorated with marble panels, according to the ancient Roman taste. Many of them, extracted during the Roman period in places of Turkey, Greece and Africa, are rare and precious. In the niches, above the doors and above the fireplace, were ancient vases, busts and classical sculptural groups. The exhibition features a bronze bust of Antonio Grimani and an oil painting on canvas with the effigy of the illustrious ancestor.

=== Chamber of Callisto ===
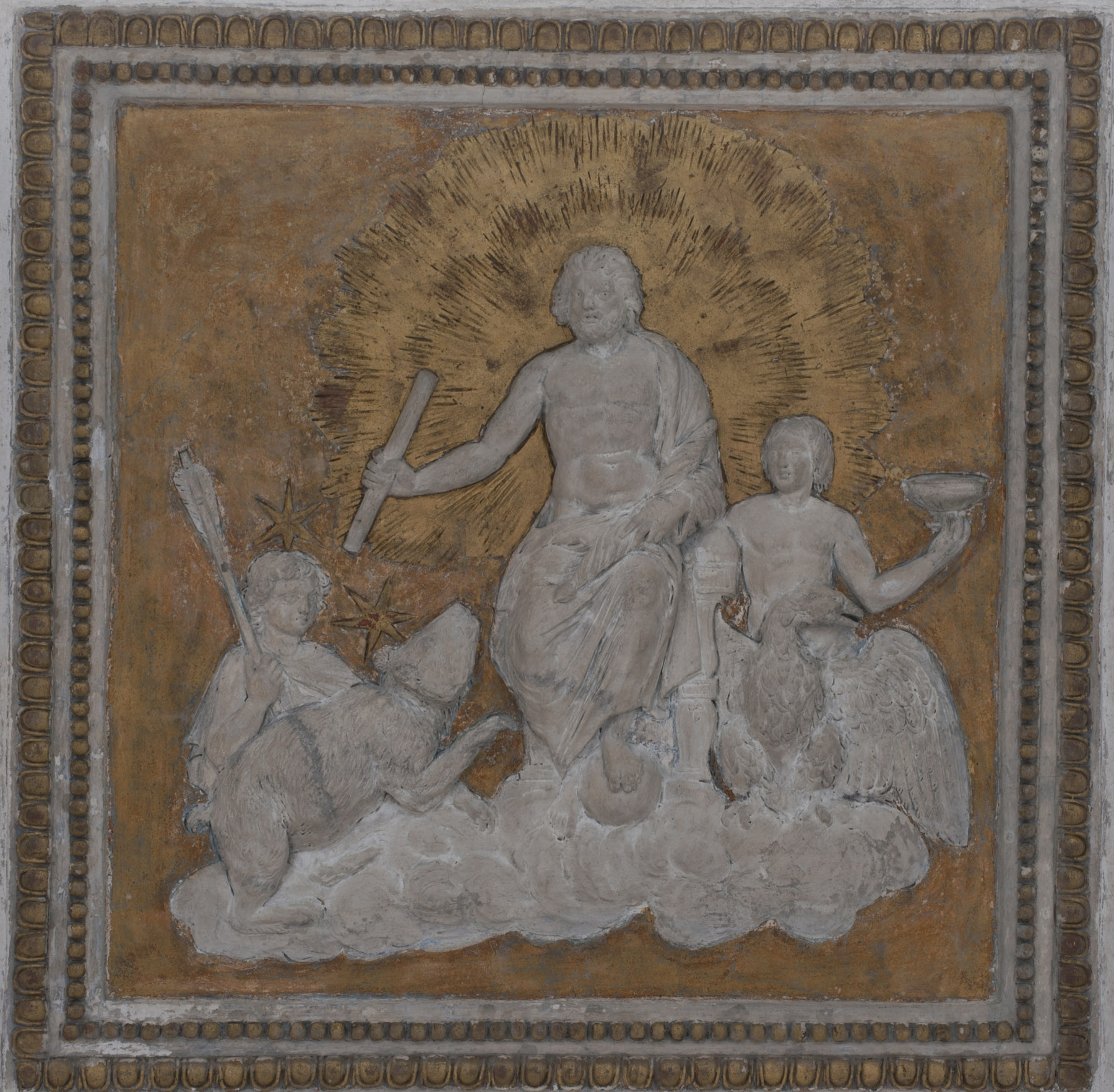
Giovanni da Udine, ceiling of Callisto's Chamber (part)

This chamber dedicated to the nymph Callisto and to the history of her metamorphosis refers to the famous Ovidian text. The story unfolds on the ceiling in five squares with a gold background, starting from the first - on the wall opposite the windows -, where the sleeping nymph is loved by Jupiter, up to the epilogue - in the middle of the ceiling-, in which Callisto and his son Arcas are turned into constellations. The ancient stucco technique was rediscovered in Rome by Giovanni da Udine. In this room, the artist who worked with Raphael offers an essay of his great ability recreating animals, still lifes and twelve putti, symbolizing the months of the year, accompanied by four referable zodiacal signs to the seasons. Some round mirrors set in the stucco embellish the composition recalling the stars of the firmament.

=== Chamber of Psyche ===
The room is presented in a totally renewed guise, with the recovery of the sixteenth-century spatiality. The room had a wooden coffered ceiling in which five paintings were placed with the fable of Cupid and Psyche, narrated by Apuleius. Of these, the octagon in the center remains, probably a copy of the original made by Francesco Salviati in 1539, which depicts Psyche revered as a goddess for her beauty. Recent work has revealed the existence of a large fireplace, on the bottom of which a salamander is carved in the flames. The two frescoed candelabra with birds and fish painted around 1560 are probably by Camillo Mantovano. Four classic heads are exhibited in the niches above the doors

=== Room of the fireplace ===
The large corner room, belonging to the oldest part of the building, was renovated in the 1560s. It is dominated by the splendid fireplace surmounted by colored marble and large stucco decorations, where niches and shelves housed other archaeological pieces from the Grimani collection. The elegance of the faces portrayed in profile, the quality of the garlands and the fruits and the amazing monster with the gaping mouth, visible in the center, suggest the genius and inventive extravagance of Federico Zuccari. On the walls are still visible fragments of a fresco decoration that recalls the colonnade of the courtyard.

== DOMUS GRIMANI 1594 -2019 ==
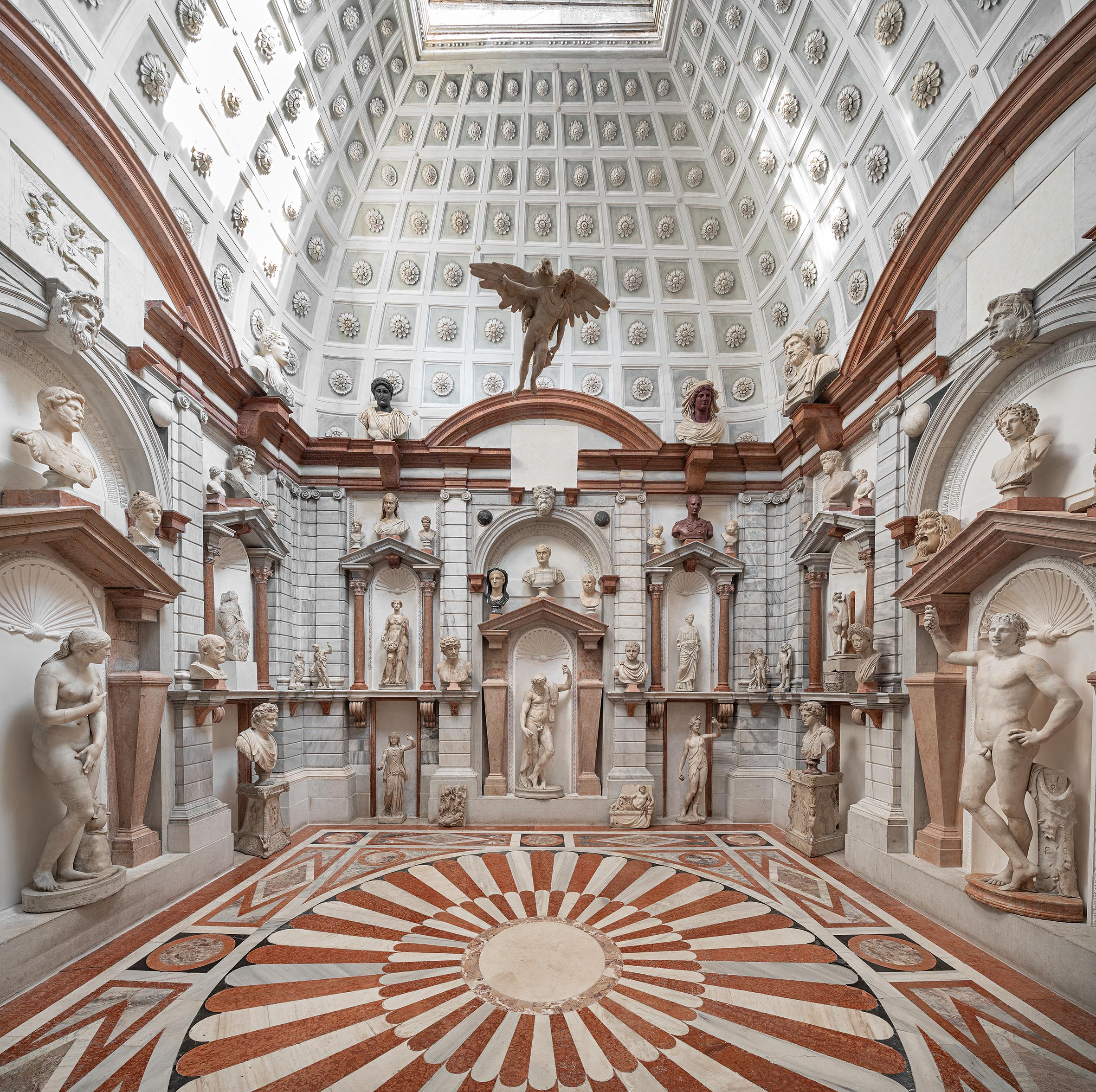
The exhibition "DOMUS GRIMANI 1594 - 2019"

On 7 May 2019 the exhibition "DOMUS GRIMANI 1594 - 2019" was inaugurated. It celebrates the temporary return of many masterpieces of Greek, Roman and Renaissance art, belonging to Giovanni Grimani's collection and their relocation to the rooms where they found until the patriarch's death.

The exhibit itinerary develops in a row of rooms (Camaron d'Oro, Sala a Fogliami, Antitribuna) leading to the Tribuna, through the only original entrance to it. In addition to the sculptures from the National Archaeological Museum of Venice, there are also exhibited some 16th-century furnishings from other Venetian museums and private collections, with the intention of recreating an aristocratic 16th century residence: one of the most noteworthy works, a tapestry of Medici manufacture based on a design by Francesco Salviati, two wooden cabinets, bronzes by Jacopo Sansovino and Tiziano Aspetti, two bronze firedogs by Girolamo Campagna and a table inlaid with ancient marbles and lapis lazuli belonged to the Grimani family.

== Bibliography ==
- Lotto A. Il collezionismo artistico dei Grimani di Santa Maria Formosa nel Cinquecento, in «Venezia Arti», n.17/18, 2003-2004, pp. 22–31.
- De Paoli M. Opera fatta diligentissimamente. Restauri di sculture classiche a Venezia tra Quattro e Cinquecento, Roma, L'Erma di Bretschneider, 2004.
- Aikema B. (a cura di) Il collezionismo a Venezia e nel Veneto ai tempi della Serenissima, Venezia, Marsilio, 2005.
- Brusegan M. La grande guida dei monumenti di Venezia - Newton & Compton Ed., Roma 2005; ISBN 88-541-0475-2.
- Lotto A. Un libro di conti (1523-1531) di Marco Grimani, procuratore di San Marco e patriarca di Aquileia, «Atti dell'Istituto Veneto di scienze, lettere ed arti. Classe di scienze morali, lettere ed arti», 165/I-II, Venezia, 2007.
- Bristot A.(a cura di), Palazzo Grimani a Santa Maria Formosa. Storia, arte, restauri, Verona, Scripta, 2008; ISBN 978-88-96162-02-6.
- Furlan C., Tosini P., I cardinali della Serenissima. Arte e committenza tra Venezia e Roma (1523 - 1605) Milano, Silvana editoriale, 2014.
