= Villa Imperiale of Pesaro =

Coordinates: 43.9210°N 12.8797°E

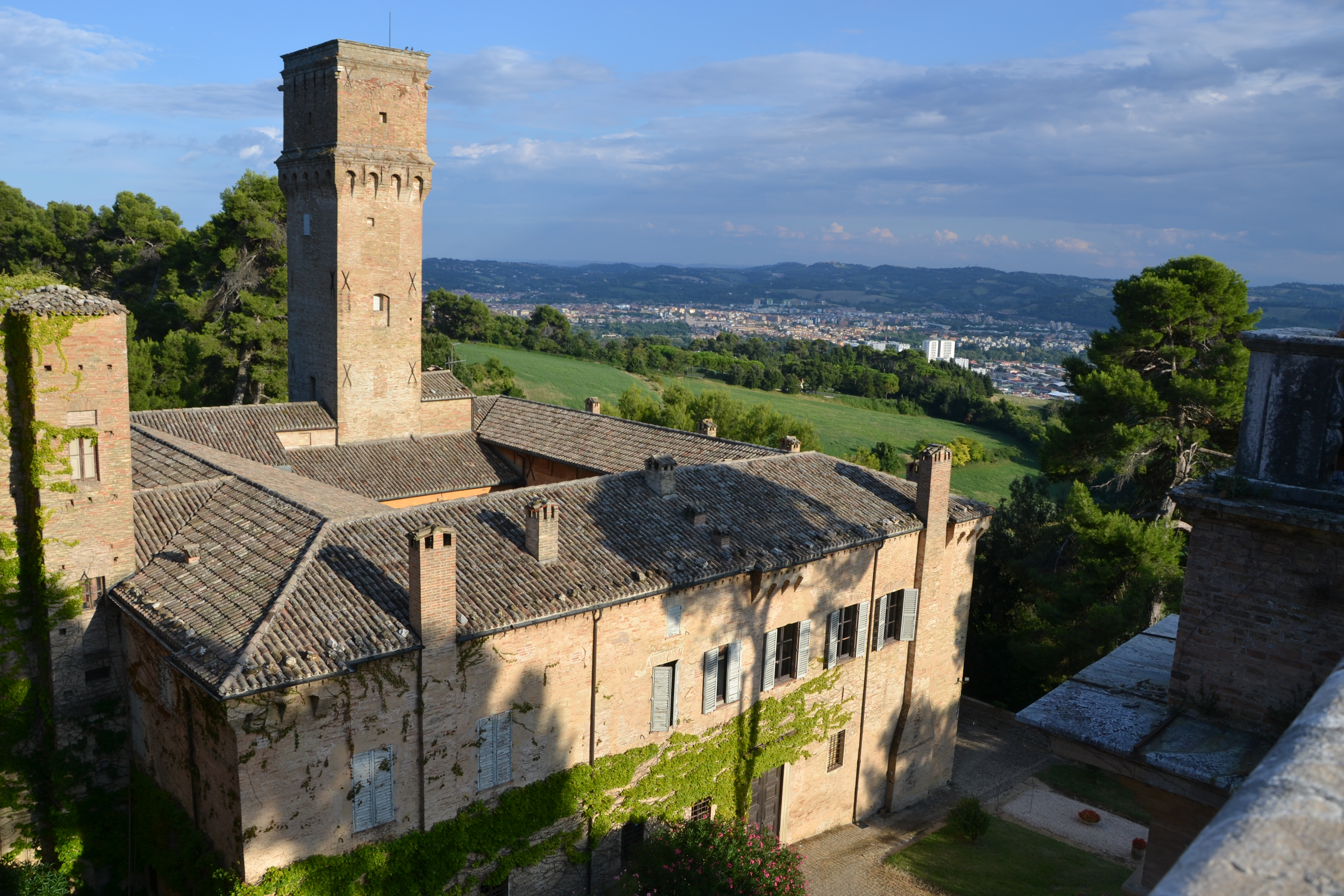
Villa Imperiale of Pesaro

The Villa Imperiale of Pesaro is a suburban palatial house outside of Pesaro, built and decorated by artists of the late-Renaissance or Mannerist period. It is now a private residence but the frescoed rooms and elaborate gardens are available for touring.

== History ==
A castle at the site was supposedly built starting in 1452 by Alessandro Sforza while he was visited by Holy Roman Emperor Frederick III. Construction continued until 1469.

After various disputes, in 1521 Pesaro was conquered by Francesco Maria I Della Rovere. He commissioned the painter and architect Girolamo Genga to transform (1523-1538) the castle into an elegant Villa di Delizia. His wife, Eleonora Gonzaga later commissioned further refurbishment by Pietro Bembo, including completing the cortile d’onore (courtyard of honor).

In 1635, the villa became part of the Medici with the marriage of Ferdinando II with Vittoria della Rovere.

Falling into disrepair, in 1763, the custody of the villa went to the Camera Apostolica of the Catholic church. In 1777 it was ceded by Pope Pius VI to Prince Orazio Albani, brother of the former pope Pope Clement XI, and father of cardinal Alessandro Albani. In the 19th century, many of the frescoes were restored by Giuseppe Gennari. Much of this work was removed during the restorations in the 1970s.

The property includes terraced and intricate Renaissance style gardens. The interior frescoes employed a number of major Mannerist painters including Dosso and Battista Dossi, Camillo Mantovano, Raffaellino del Colle, Bronzino, and Francesco Menzocchi. Topics include the Labors of Hercules, Story of the Rovere family, Hall of Calumny, and caryatids, amorini, and other decorations.

On April 5, 2019, a presentation at the Fondazione Cassa di Risparmio in Pesaro described the project of cataloguing and digitizing a unique collection of documents belonging to Pope Clement XI. These had been housed in eight large zinc chests at the Albani Palace in Urbino until its sale in 1915; at that time the chests were transferred to the Villa Imperiale. Of particular interest are the Pope's private documents and a collection of 23 music books for lute and other instruments, such as harpsichord and viola da gamba. The music is mostly by composers of the Roman circle, from between 1576 and 1653. Other unique items include scientific books and texts covering various fields of knowledge collected from the Late Renaissance until the 1700s.
