= The Abduction of Helen (Genga) =

Painting by Girolamo Genga

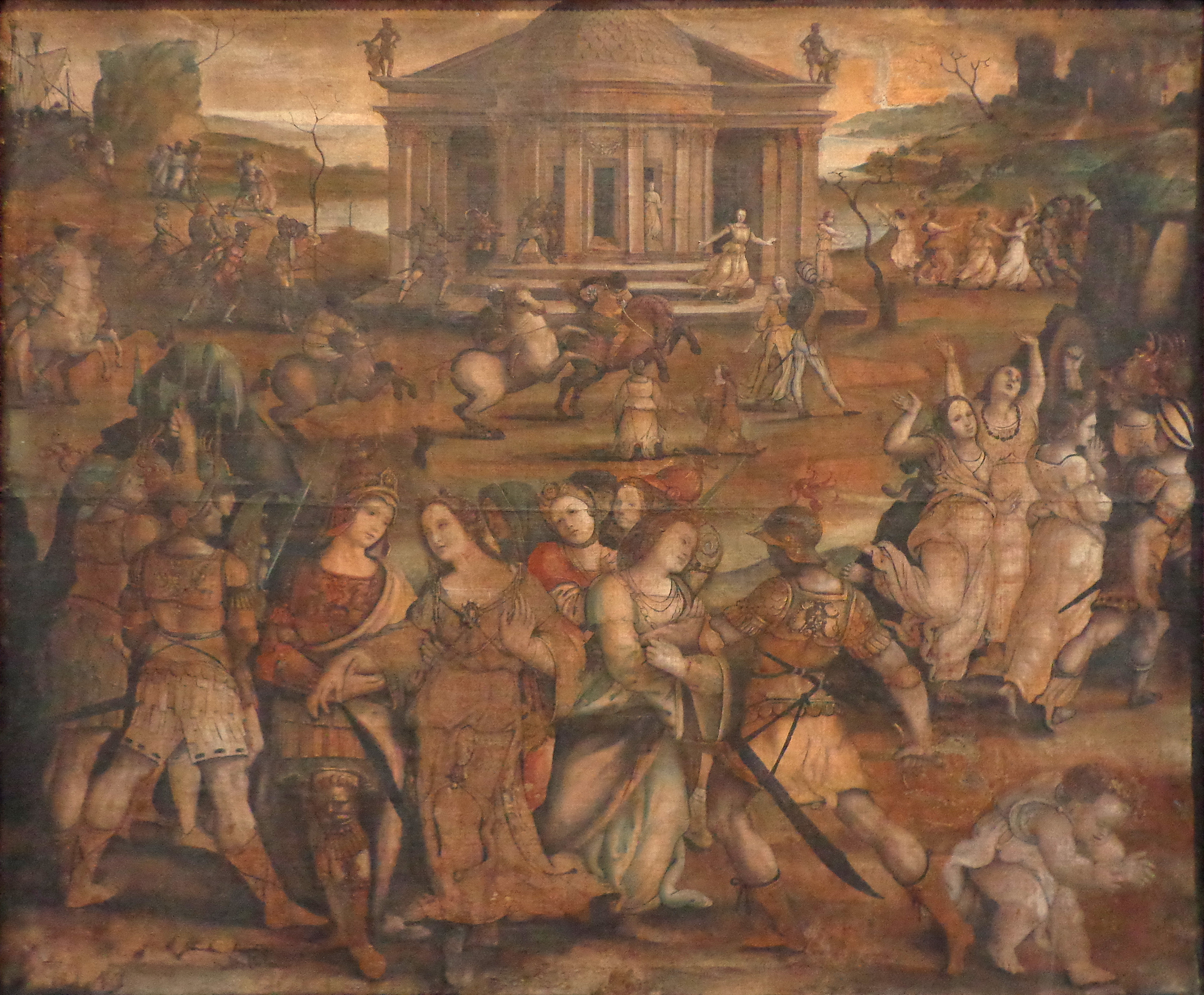
- Artist: Girolamo Genga
- Year: circa 1510
- Medium: tempera on canvas
- Movement: High Renaissance
- Subject: Helen abducted by Paris
- Dimensions: 156 cm × 186 cm (61 in × 73 in)
- Location: Musée des Beaux-Arts, Strasbourg
- Accession: 1898

The Abduction of Helen is an Italian Renaissance mythological painting by Girolamo Genga. The painting was bought in 1898 in Rome by Wilhelm von Bode for its present location, the Musée des Beaux-Arts of Strasbourg, France. Its inventory number is 490.

The painting comes from the palace of Pandolfo Petrucci in Siena, which had been decorated in the years 1508 to 1512 with frescoes and paintings by Pinturicchio, Luca Signorelli, Domenico Beccafumi, and Genga. Measuring 156 × 186 cm (61 × 73 in), The Abduction of Helen is slightly larger than the other surviving works (125 × 135 cm, or 49 × 53 in) and had probably not hung in the same room, although the configuration of the palace's interiors, and the original locations of the artworks, are now lost and impossible to reconstruct. It is also the only tempera painting among the surviving works.

Helen of Troy is depicted as being gently led away by prince Paris, while there is some turmoil among the ladies of her court. The temple in the background and center of the painting while the main action takes place in the foreground is reminiscent of a similar composition by Genga's master Perugino, and by Genga's colleague Raphael, among others.

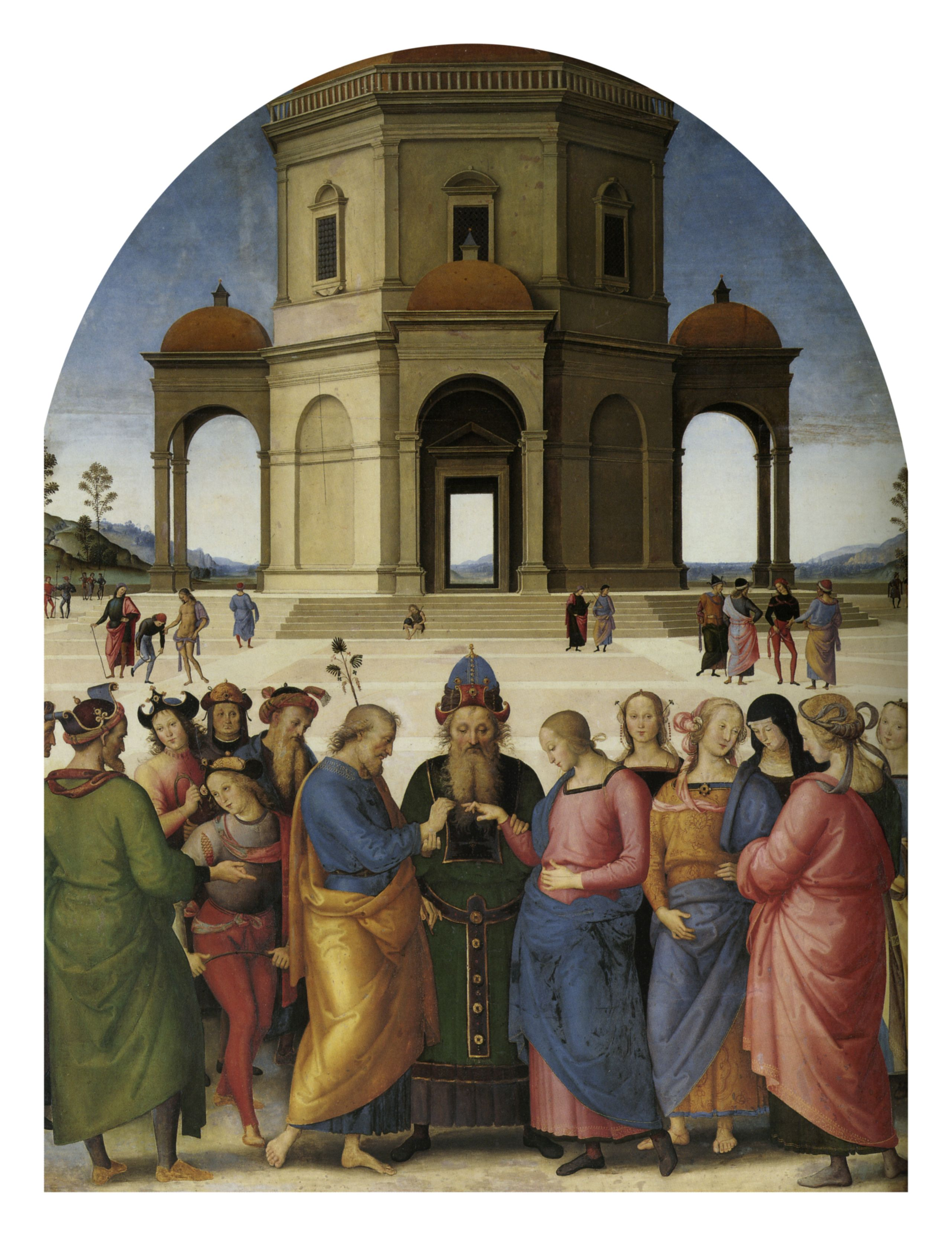
Marriage of the Virgin by Perugino

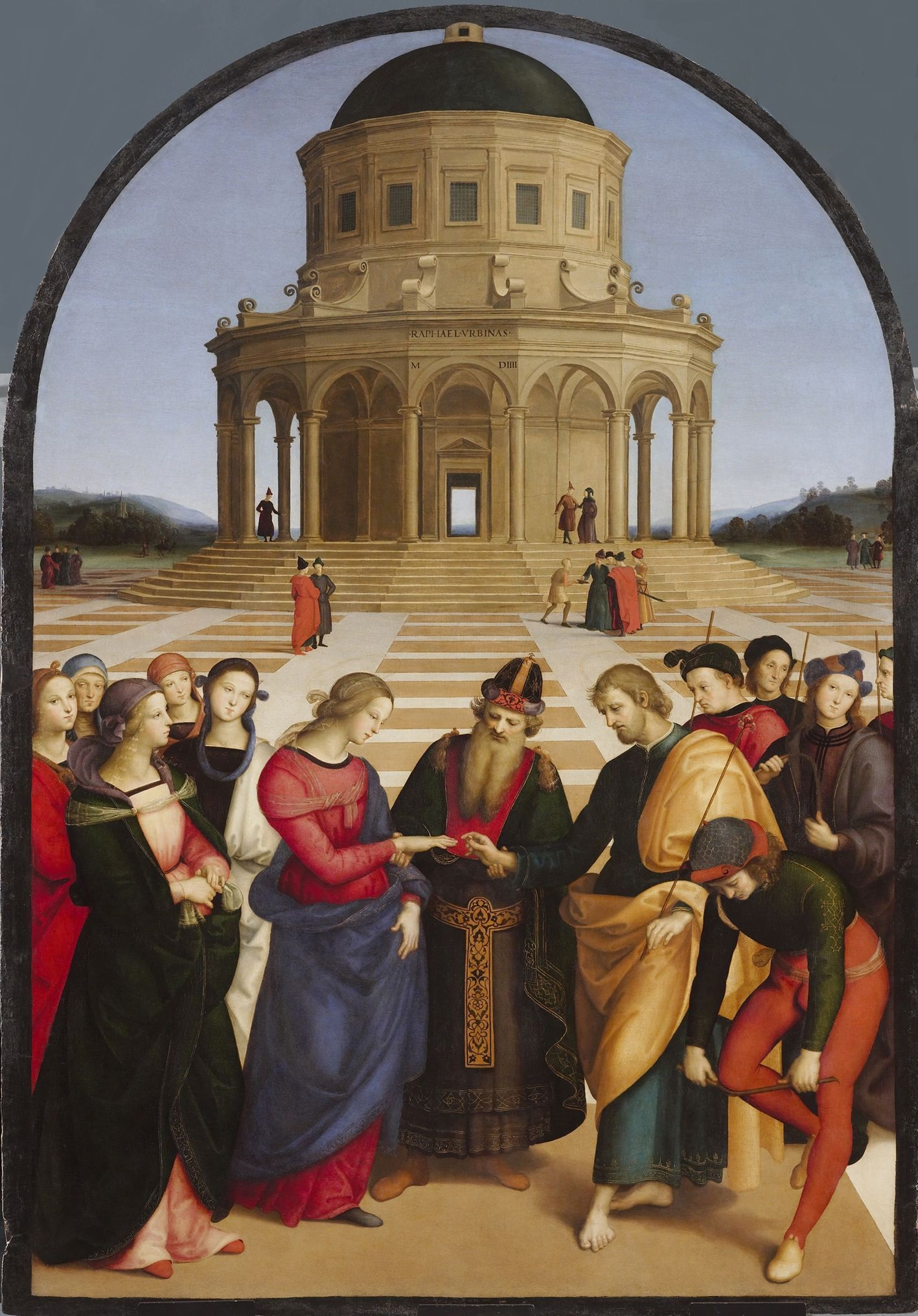
Marriage of the Virgin by Raphael
