= Girolamo Genga =

Italian painter (c. 1476–1551)

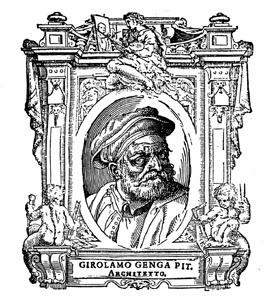
- Portrait from "Le Vite" by Giorgio Vasari, edition of 1568.
- Born: Girolamo Genga c. 1476 near Urbino, Italy
- Died: 11 July 1551 near Urbino, Italy
- Known for: Painting; Architecture
- Movement: High Renaissance

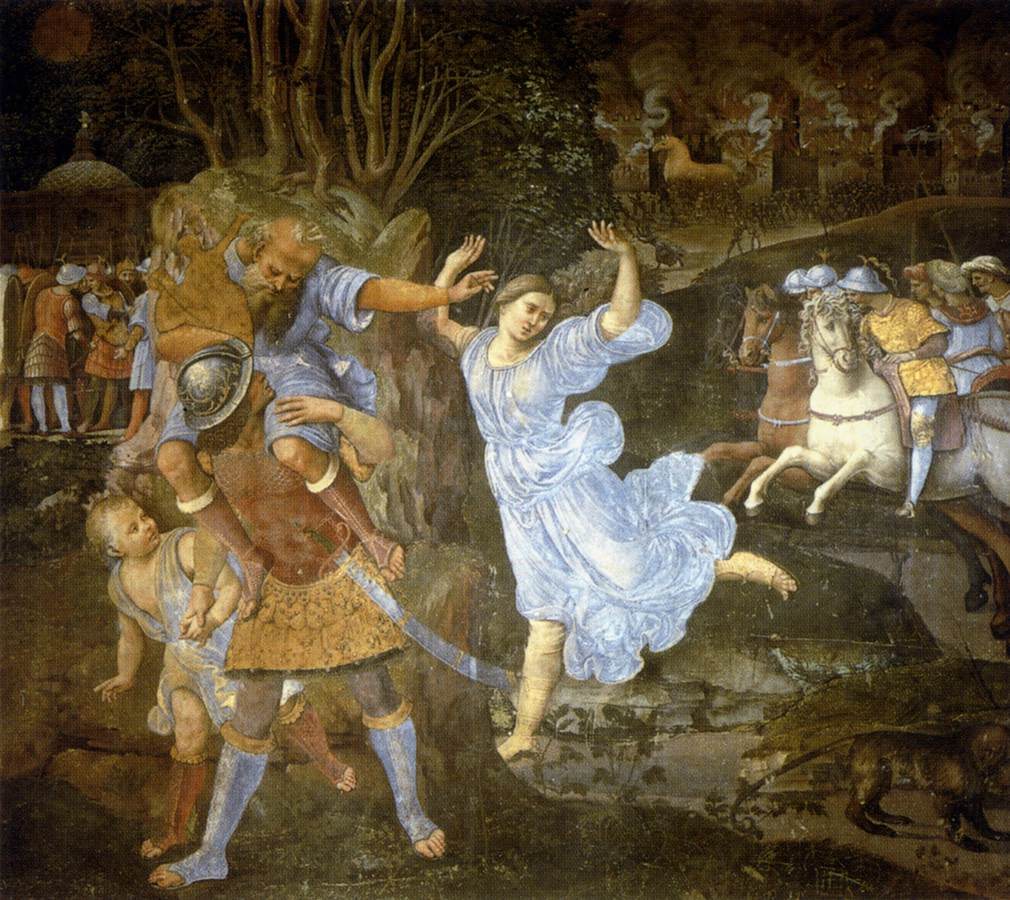
Flight of Aeneas from Troy, fresco painting by Girolamo Genga, 1507-1510, Pinacoteca Nazionale, Siena

Girolamo Genga (c. 1476 – 11 July 1551) was an Italian painter and architect of the late Renaissance, Mannerist style.

== Life and career ==
Genga was born in a region near Urbino. According mainly to Giorgio Vasari's biography, by age thirteen Genga had gained an apprenticeship in Orvieto under Luca Signorelli. He was afterwards for three years with Pietro Perugino, in company with Raphael. He next worked in Florence and Siena (where he decorated the Petrucci palace c. 1508), along with Timoteo della Vite; and in the latter city he painted various compositions for Pandolfo Petrucci, a leading local statesman, among which The Abduction of Helen, now in the Musée des Beaux-Arts de Strasbourg.

Returning to Urbino, he was employed by Duke Guidobaldo da Montefeltro in the decorations of his palace, and showed extraordinary aptitude for theatrical adornments. He is recorded as having helped design the decorations for the Duke's funeral in 1508. From Urbino, he travelled to Rome and painted one of his masterpieces, The Resurrection, for the church of Santa Caterina da Siena.

Francesco Maria I della Rovere, duke of Urbino, recalled Genga, and commissioned him to execute works in connection with his marriage to Eleonora Gonzaga in 1522. This prince was soon afterwards expelled by Pope Leo X, and Genga followed him to Mantua. When Della Rovere regained Pesaro, he had Genga reconstruct a former castle into a suburban villa, known as the Villa Imperiale This semi-rural retreat was refurbished from c. 1530 onwards. Its sunken court is the direct precedent for the more famous one at Villa Giulia, Rome, For the fresco decoration of the interior, Genga recruited a number of major Mannerist painters, including Francesco Menzocchi, Bronzino, Dosso Dossi, and Raffaellino dal Colle. The duke of Urbino was eventually restored to his dominions; he took Genga with him, and appointed him the ducal architect and decorator. He worked extensively on the Villa Imperiale on Mount Accio.

Among his work in Urbino, was the scenography of plays, for example, Castiglione described the sumptuous decoration (presumably Genga's) of the performance of Bibbiena’s La Calandria in Urbino on 6 February 1513. He also decorated the chapel of San Martino in the cathedral.

Genga was a sculptor as well as a musician. Among his pupils was his own son Bartolommeo (1518–1558), who became a respected architect. There are few extant paintings by Genga. One of his leading works is in the church of Sant'Agostino in Cesena: a triptych in oil, representing the Annunciation, God the Father in Glory, and the Madonna and Child. Among his architectural works are the church of San Giovanni Battista in Pesaro; the bishop's palace at Senigallia; the façade of the Mantua cathedral; and fortifications near Pesaro.

Genga retired to a house in the vicinity of Urbino, continuing still to produce designs in pencil.
