= Theseus and the Minotaur (sculpture) =

Marble sculpture by Antonio Canova

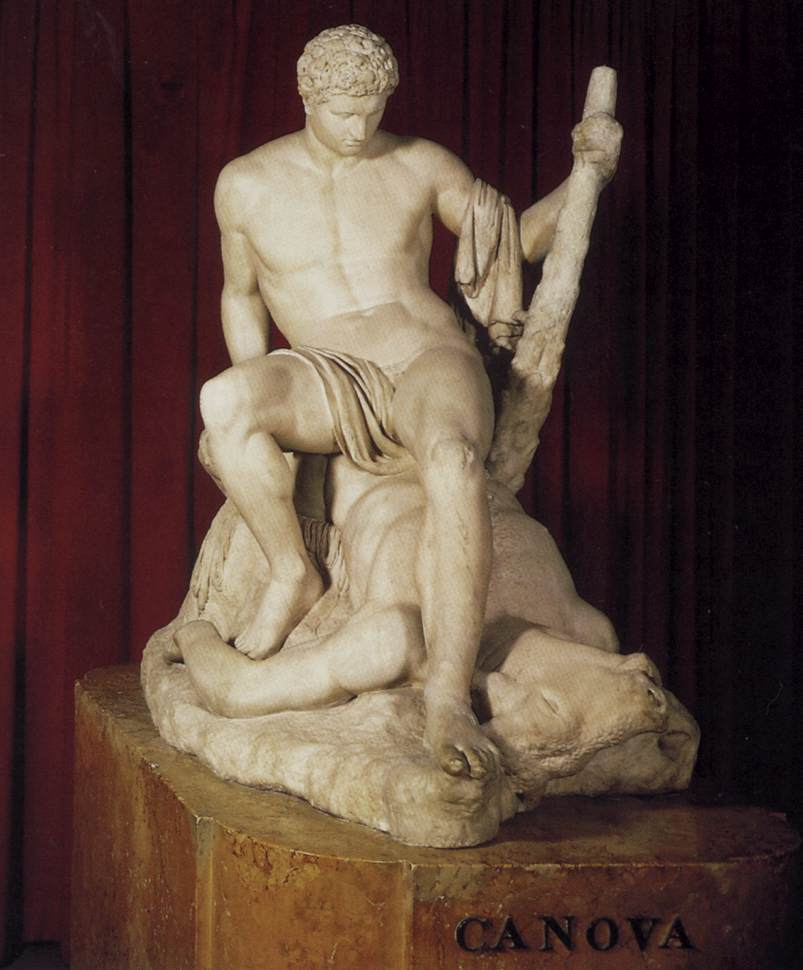
Theseus and the Minotaur (1781–1782) by Antonio Canova

Theseus and the Minotaur is a 1781–1782 white marble sculpture by Antonio Canova, now in the Victoria and Albert Museum in London, which bought it in 1962.

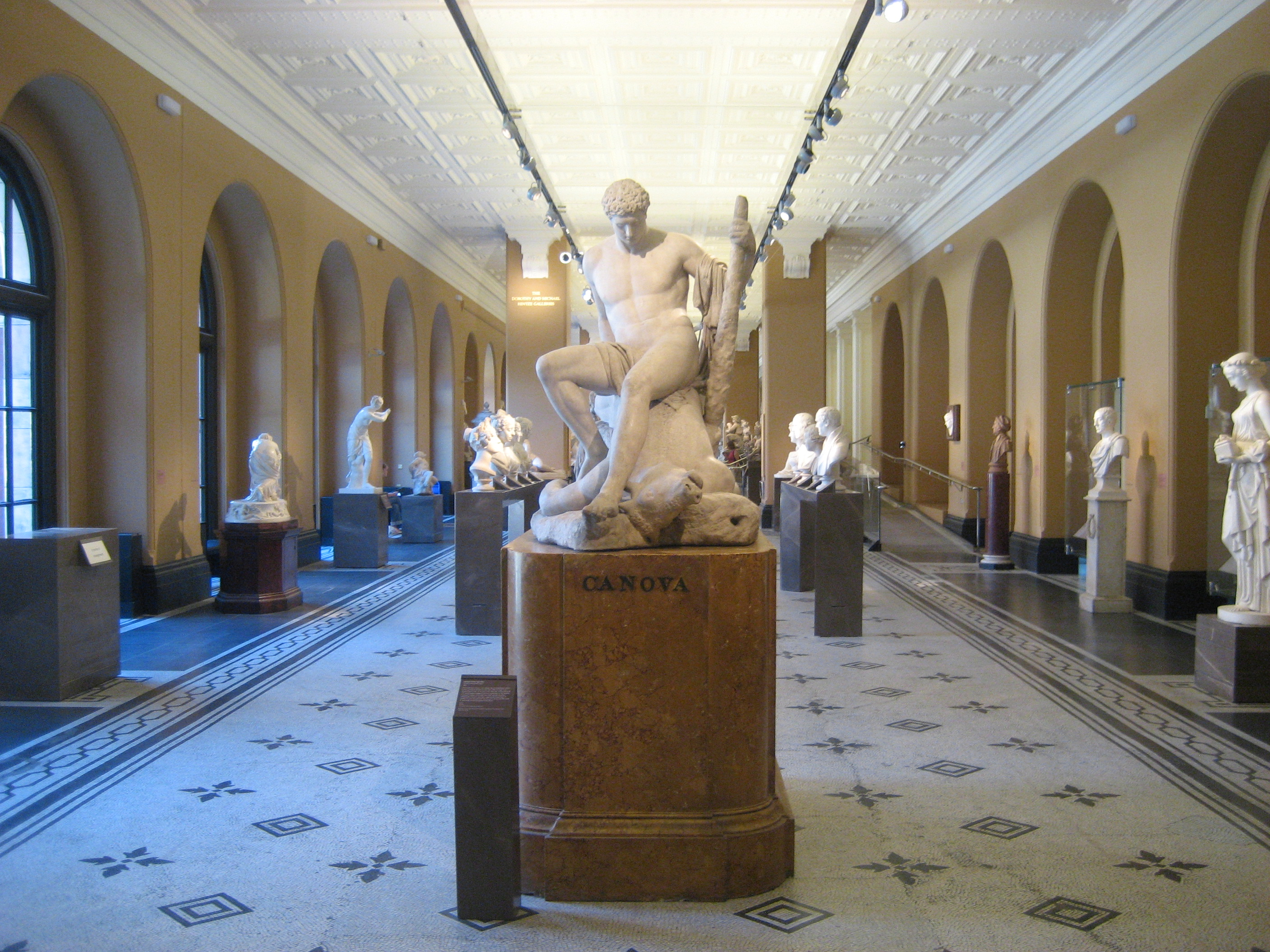
The sculpture in Room 22 of the V&A

The work was commissioned by Girolamo Zulian, Venetian ambassador to Rome and one of Canova's patrons, who also gave him the marble block for it, one of his earliest works after settling in Rome. Zulian left the choice of subject up to Canova, to whom Canova's friend Gavin Hamilton suggested Theseus just after killing the Minotaur from Ovid's Metamorphoses. The subject is also intended as an Enlightenment allegory of reason triumphing over irrationality.

Its physical and spiritual tranquility and Theseus' anatomy both directly refer to the "noble simplicity and quiet grandeur" which contemporary art critic Johann Joachim Winckelmann held to be the unique characteristic of Hellenistic art. So great is its debt to that era of art that its first viewers initially thought it to be a copy of a Greek original and were shocked to learn it was a contemporary work. The work was widely disseminated via an engraving by Raffaello Sanzio Morghen and helped establish Canova's reputation.

By the time it was completed Zulian had left Rome for Constantinople and he released the work to Canova, who sold it to the Austrian collector Count Moritz von Fries, who took it to Vienna. It was next acquired sometime before 1822 by Charles Vane, 3rd Marquess of Londonderry, who installed it in his London residence of Londonderry House, most likely sometime in the 1820s. It remained there until that house's contents were sold just before its demolition in the 1960s, at which time it was acquired by its present owner for £3000, a third of which was provided by the National Art-Collections Fund.
