= Venice National Archaeological Museum =

Italian archaeological museum

- Museo Archeologico Nazionale di Venezia
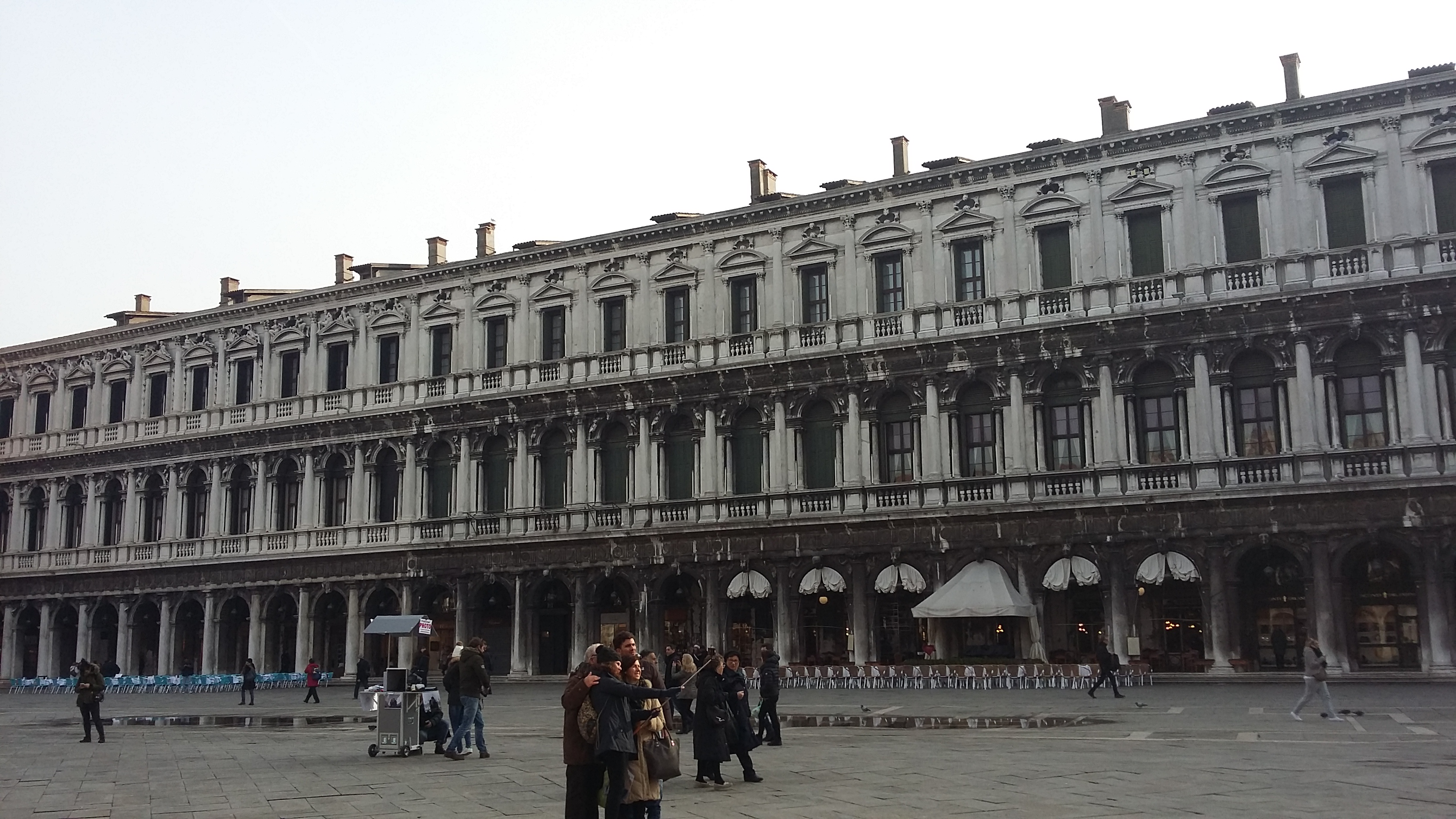
- Façade of the museum on Piazza San Marco
- Established: c. 1523 (collection by Cardinal Domenico Grimani)
- Location: Piazza San Marco 52, 30124 Venice, Italy
- Coordinates: 45.4336°N 12.3393°E
- Type: Archaeology museum
- Director: Michela Sediari
- Website: Official website

The National Archaeological Museum of Venice (Italian: Museo Archeologico Nazionale di Venezia) is an archaeological museum located in Piazza San Marco, Venice, Italy. It houses one of the most important collections of Greek and Roman antiquities in northern Italy.

The origins of the museum trace back to the collection of Cardinal Domenico Grimani (1461–1523), whose private antiquities formed the nucleus of what would later become the museum's holdings. Some of these artifacts date as far back as the 1st century BC.

The museum's collections include:

- Greek and Roman sculptures
- Ceramics, vases, and ivories
- Coins, gems, and jewelry
- Portrait busts of Roman emperors
- Ancient inscriptions and stone artifacts
- Objects of Assyro-Babylonian, Greek, Etruscan, Roman, and Egyptian origin from the Neolithic period
- The Armenian-Venetian collection
- Legal texts from the 17th century
- Bilingual dictionaries

Additionally, several archaeological items from the Correr Museum are also housed here.

In May 2025, the National Archaeological Museum opened a new entrance to the public, which had been closed since 1999. That autumn, the museum hosted "ArcheoMateria" an exhibition combining ancient statuary with modern Venetian glass.
