= Santa Fosca, Venice =

Church in Venice, Italy

Santa Fosca
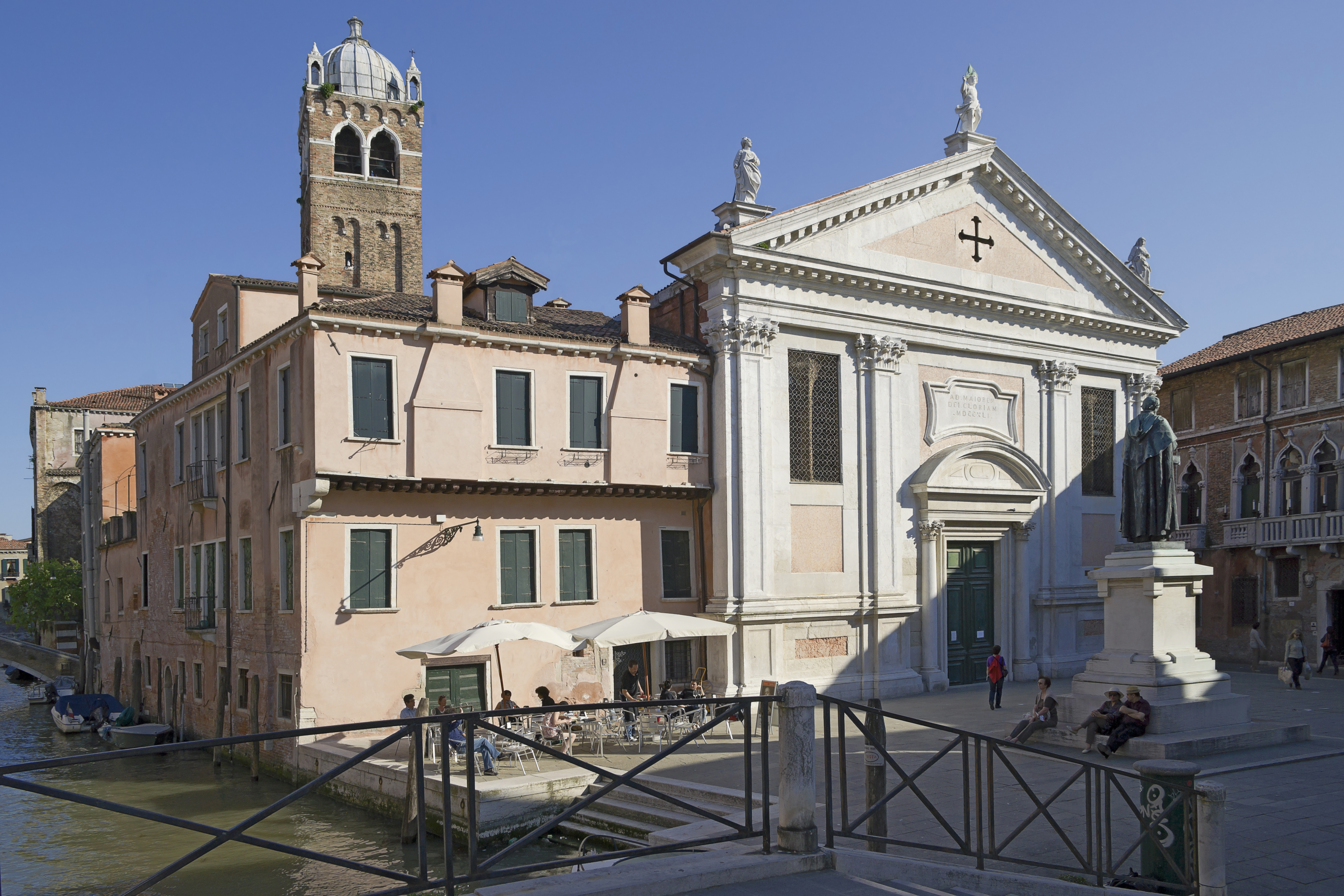
- Santa Fosca in Venice

- Location within Venice Location within Italy

Religion
- Affiliation: Roman Catholic
- Province: Venice

Location
- Location: Venice, Italy
- Interactive map of Santa Fosca
- Coordinates: 45°26′35″N 12°19′56″E

Architecture
- Architect: Domenico Rossi

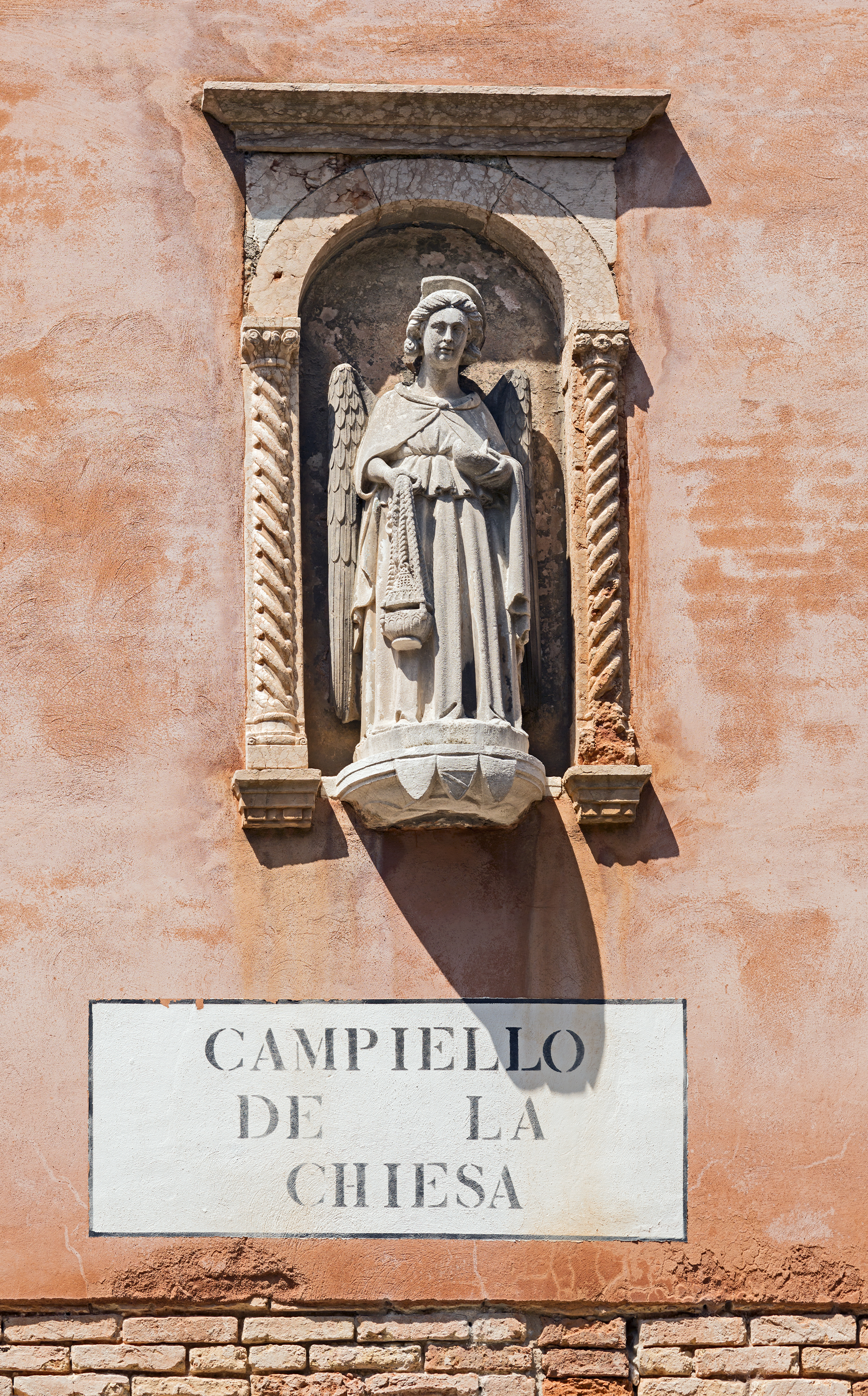
Angel thurifer thirteenth century

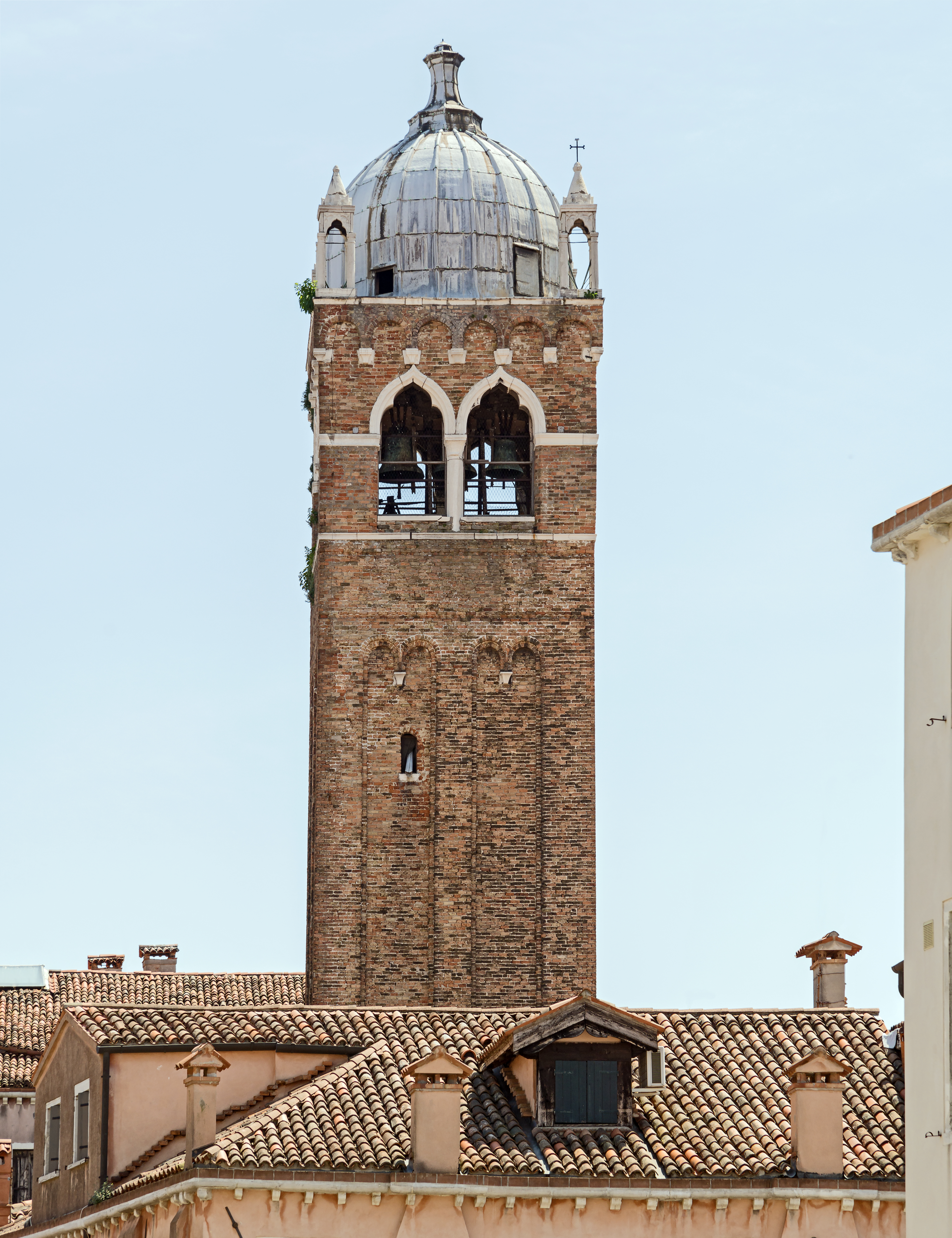
Bell tower

Santa Fosca is a church in the sestiere of Cannaregio of Venezia, Italy. Adjacent to the Strada Nova, it faces the campo of Santa Fosca. The church is named after, and dedicated to, the child saint Fusca of Ravenna.

On the campo stands the monument with a bronze statue of Paolo Sarpi, who was reported to have been stabbed here by papal mercenaries.

Documents attest to a church of this name dating to the 10th century. The present building dates to reconstructions beginning in the 18th century.

The facade (1733-1741), designed by Domenico Rossi, was built with the patronage of the patrician Donà family. That family once occupied the adjacent Palazzo Giovanelli. The church now belongs to the parish of San Marcuola.

The interior has a Trinity and the Virgin by Filippo Bianchi; while the Life of Santa Fosca altarpieces were painted by Francesco Migliori. This church should be distinguished from the older small church of Santa Fosca, Torcello, attached to the Cathedral of Santa Maria Assunta.
