= Raffaellino del Colle =

Italian painter (1490–1566)

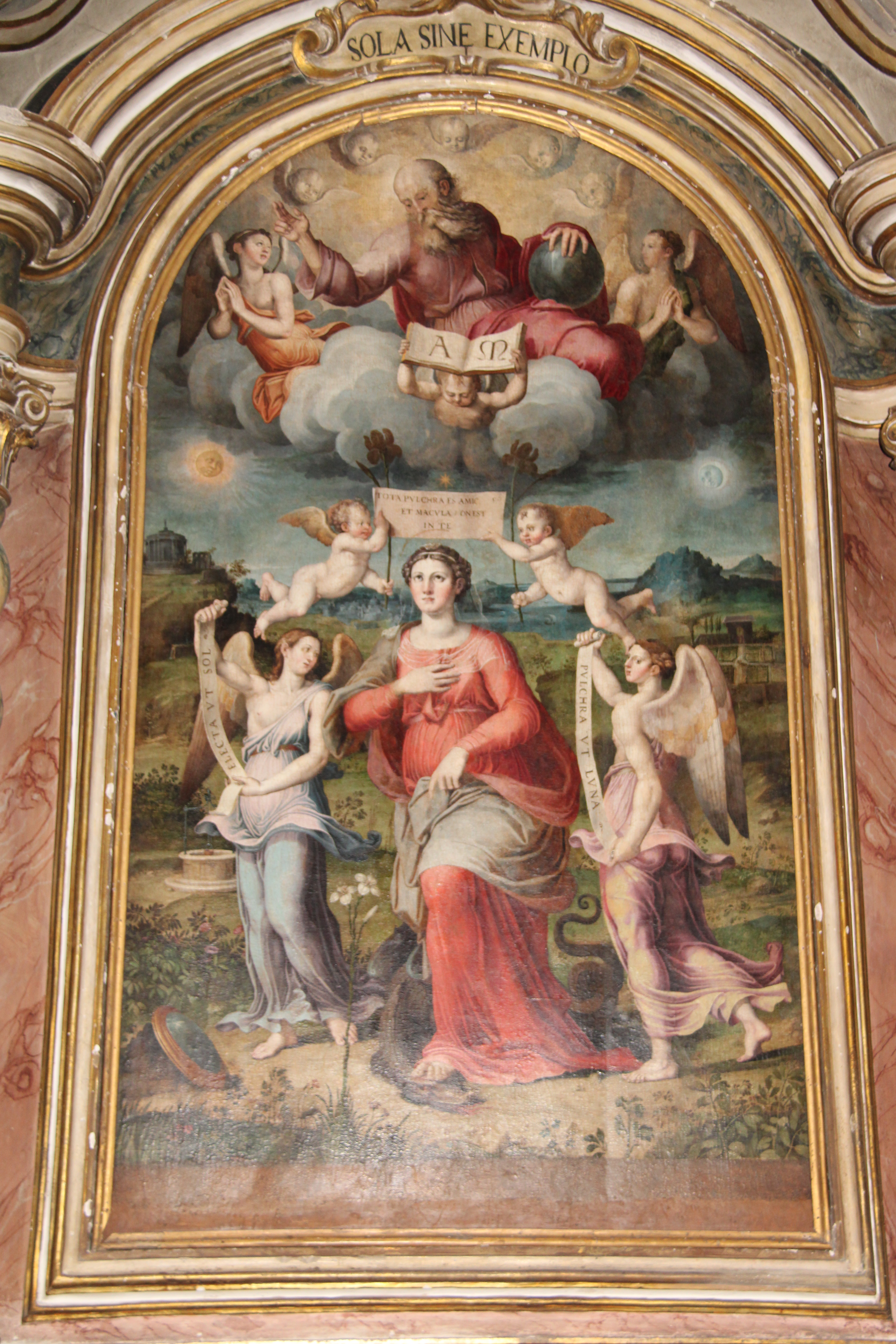
Immaculate Conception (1530-32)

Raffaellino del Colle (1490–1566) was an Italian Mannerist painter active mostly in Umbria. He was born in the frazione of Colle in Borgo Sansepolcro, province of Arezzo, Tuscany, Italy.

== Biography ==
He is also called Raffaellino della Colle or Raffaello dal Colle. Raffaellino was a pupil of Raphael, whom he is held to have assisted in the decoration of the Farnesina and of the stanze in the Vatican Palace. After Raphael's death, Raffaellino continued working in the Vatican, helping complete the Sala di Constantino though now under the direction of Giulio Romano. After the 1527 Sack of Rome, like most of Romano's studio and most of the foreign art community, Raffaellino and other artists dispersed through Italy, most returning to their home cities. Rafaellino went to Città di Castello, near his birthplace, where he painted altar-pieces for the principal churches, which are now mostly to be found in that town's Municipal Art Gallery. He also worked in Borgo San Sepolcro. He worked for the service Duke Della Rovere in Urbino from 1539 to 1543. He also worked with Girolamo Genga, decorating the Camera dei Semibusti, Sala della Calunnia, and Cabinet of Hercules of the Villa Imperiale of Pesaro for Francesco Maria I della Rovere, Duke of Urbino. In Perugia, he worked at the Rocca Paolina (1540). In 1536, Vasari commissioned from Raffaellino some ephemeral street decorations to celebrate the entry of Charles V into Florence.

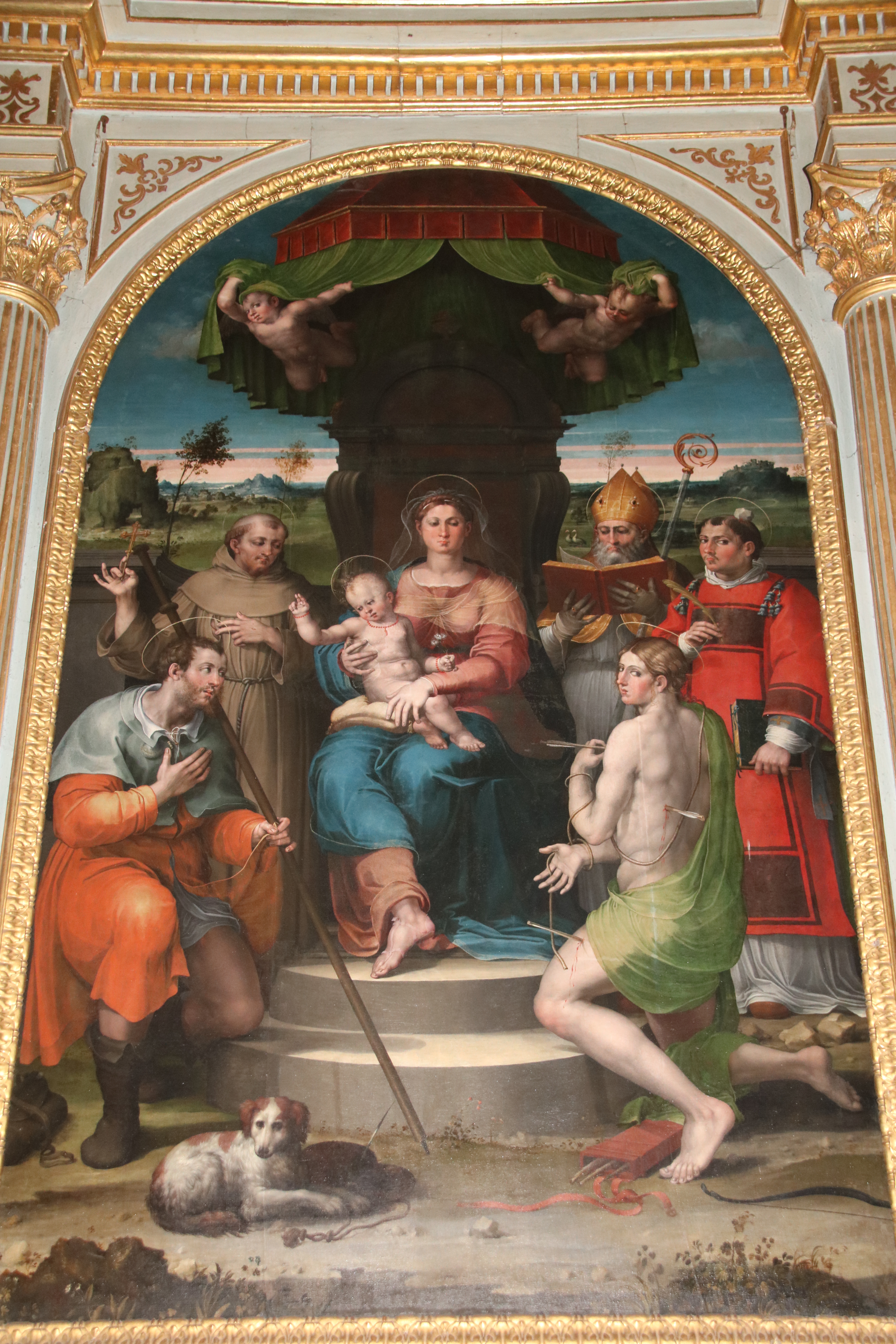
Mary with the Child and Saints (1540)
