= Oratorio di Santa Cecilia, Bologna =

Church in Bologna, Italy

Coordinates: 44.4954°N 11.3490°E

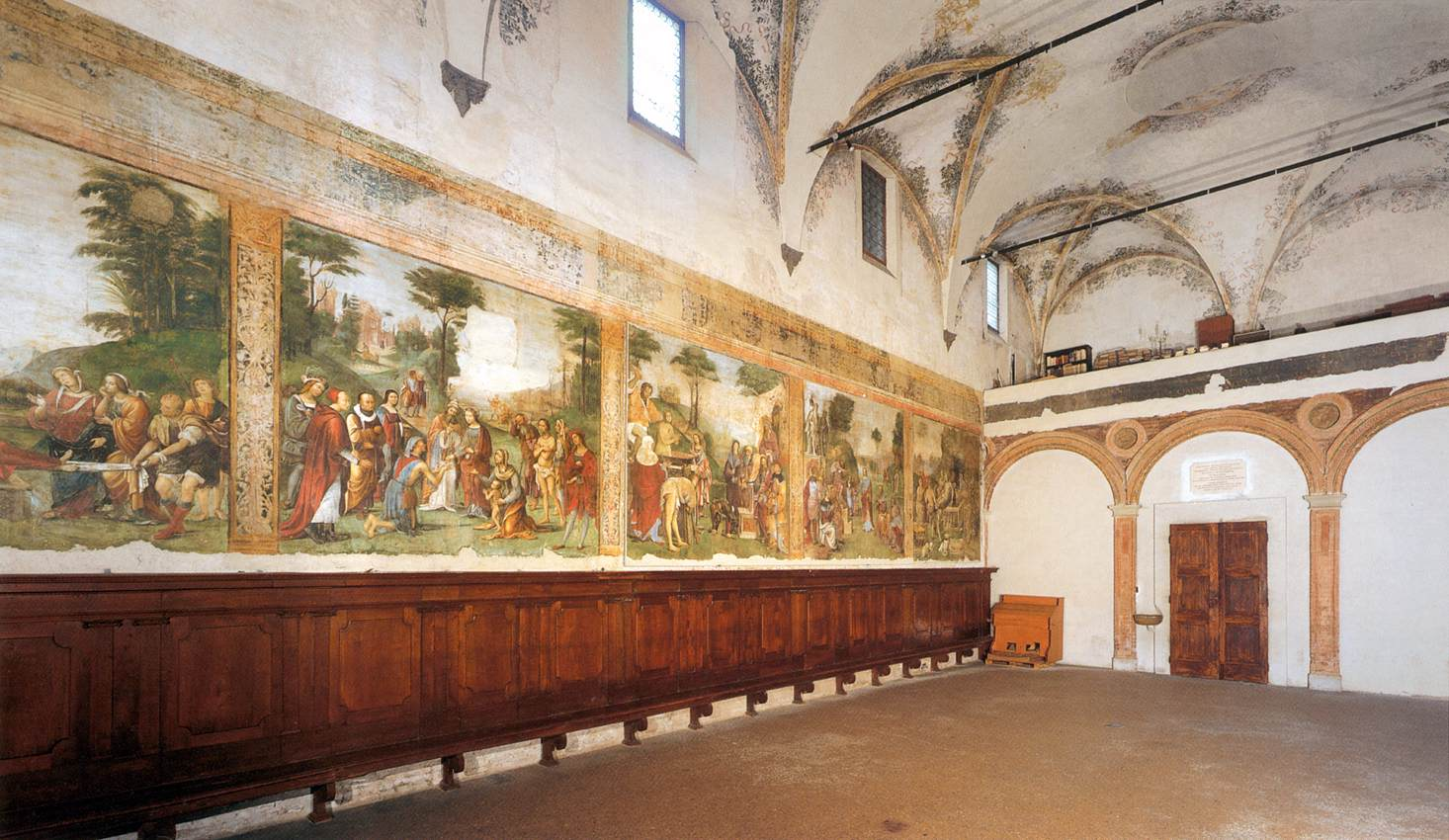

The Oratory of Saints Cecilia and Valeriano is a religious site in central Bologna, found on Via Zamboni, contiguous to the portico of the church of San Giacomo Maggiore.

The oratory was built at the site of a Romanesque church commissioned by the then ruler of Bologna Giovanni II Bentivoglio. It was frescoed starting in 1505 by series of Renaissance painters associated with the Bentivoglio court, including Francesco Francia, Lorenzo Costa and Amico Aspertini. The frescoes cover the walls flanking the oratory entrance. In ten panels, divided by pilaster strips in decorated grotteschi, scenes from the life of Saint Cecilia and her husband Valerian are described.

The individual attribution of all the panels is not entirely clear; they depict:

1. Marriage of Cecilia and Valerian
2. Valerian converted by Pope Saint Urban
3. Valerian baptized by the Pope Urban
4. Saints Cecilia and Valerian crowned by an angel
5. Martyrdom of Saints Valerian and Tiburtius (attributed to Aspertini)
6. Burial of the Martyrs (attributed to Aspertini)
7. Trial of Saint Cecilia
8. Martyrdom of Saint Cecilia
9. St Cecilia donates all her goods to the poor
10. Burial of Saint Cecilia

Other artist involved in these or later works include Francesco Cavazzoni, Tiburzio Passarotti (Son of Bartolomeo), Cesare Baglioni, Cesare Tamaroccio, Giovanni Maria Chiodarolo, Bartolomeo Bagnacavallo, and Biagio Pupini. The main altarpiece was a Crucifixion by Giacomo Francia, now held in the Pinacoteca Nazionale di Bologna, as well as a 14th-century fresco once outside the chapel by Giovanni di Ottonello.

== Gallery ==
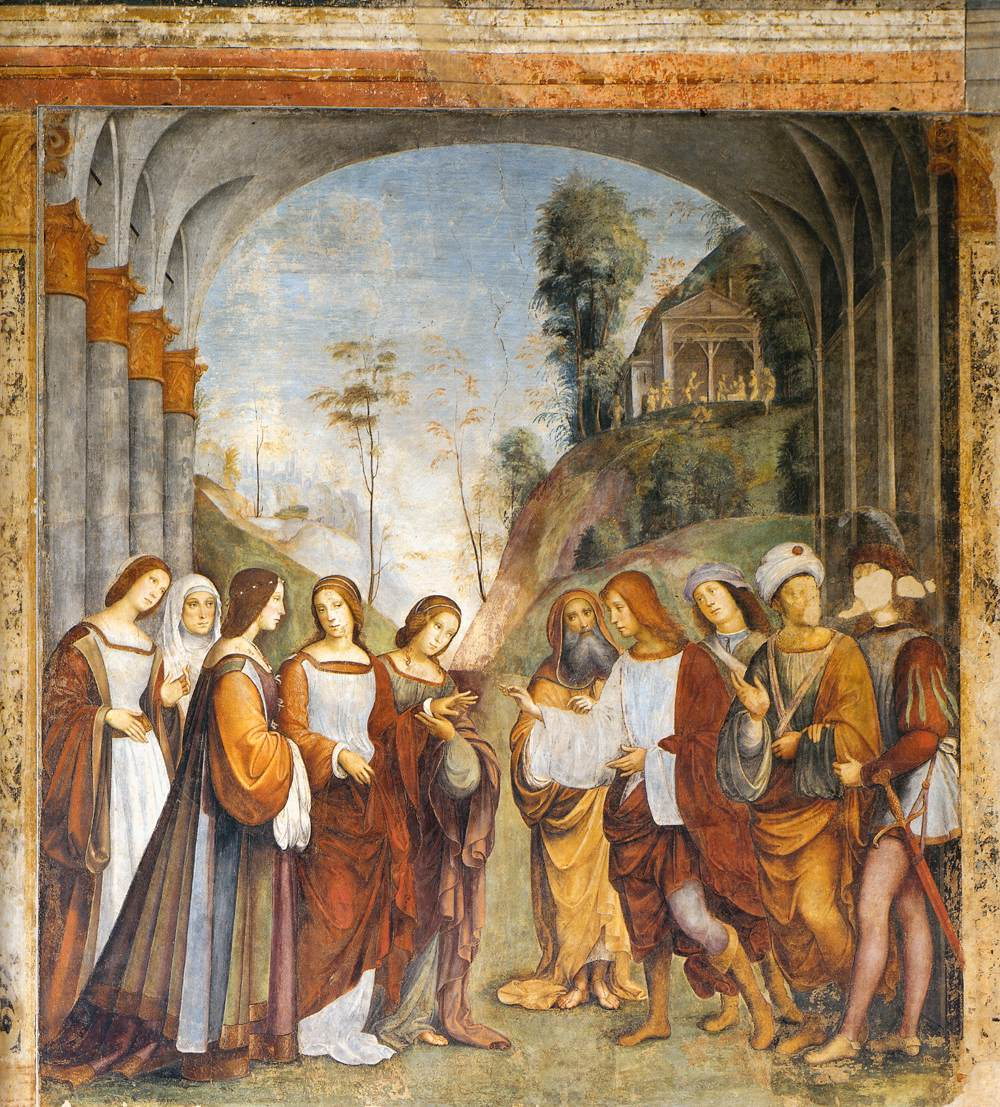
The Marriage of Cecilia and Valerian

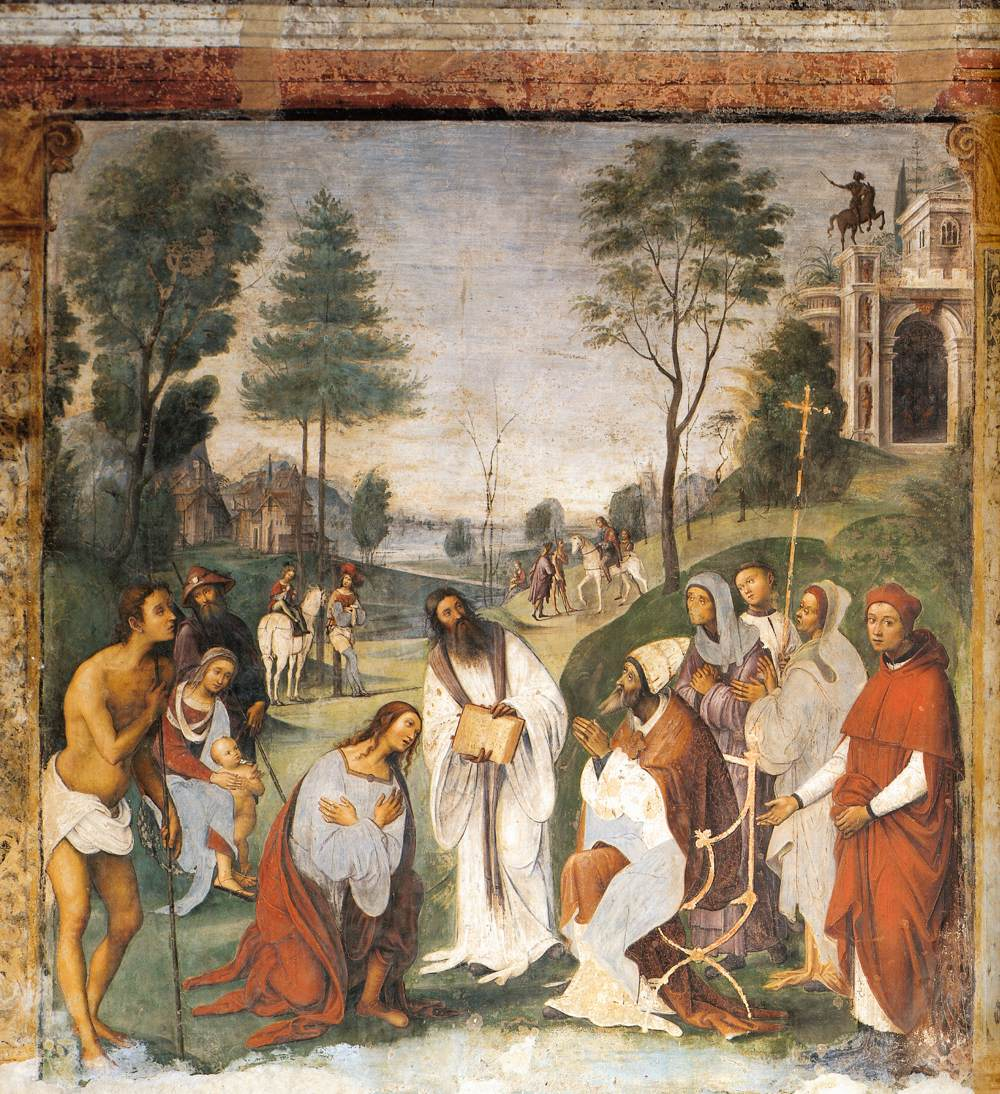
Conversion of Valerian by pope Urban by Costa

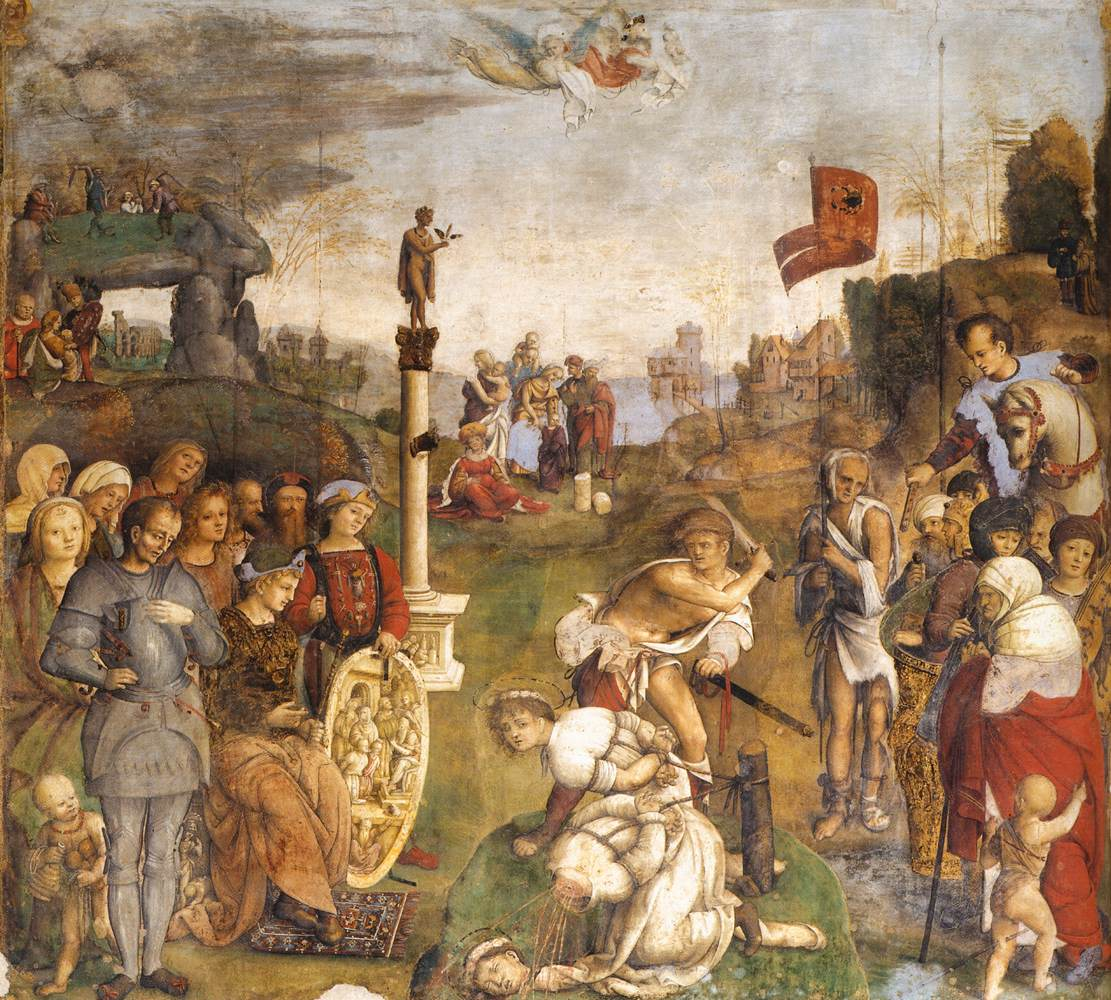
Martyrdom of Valerian and Tiburtius by Aspertini

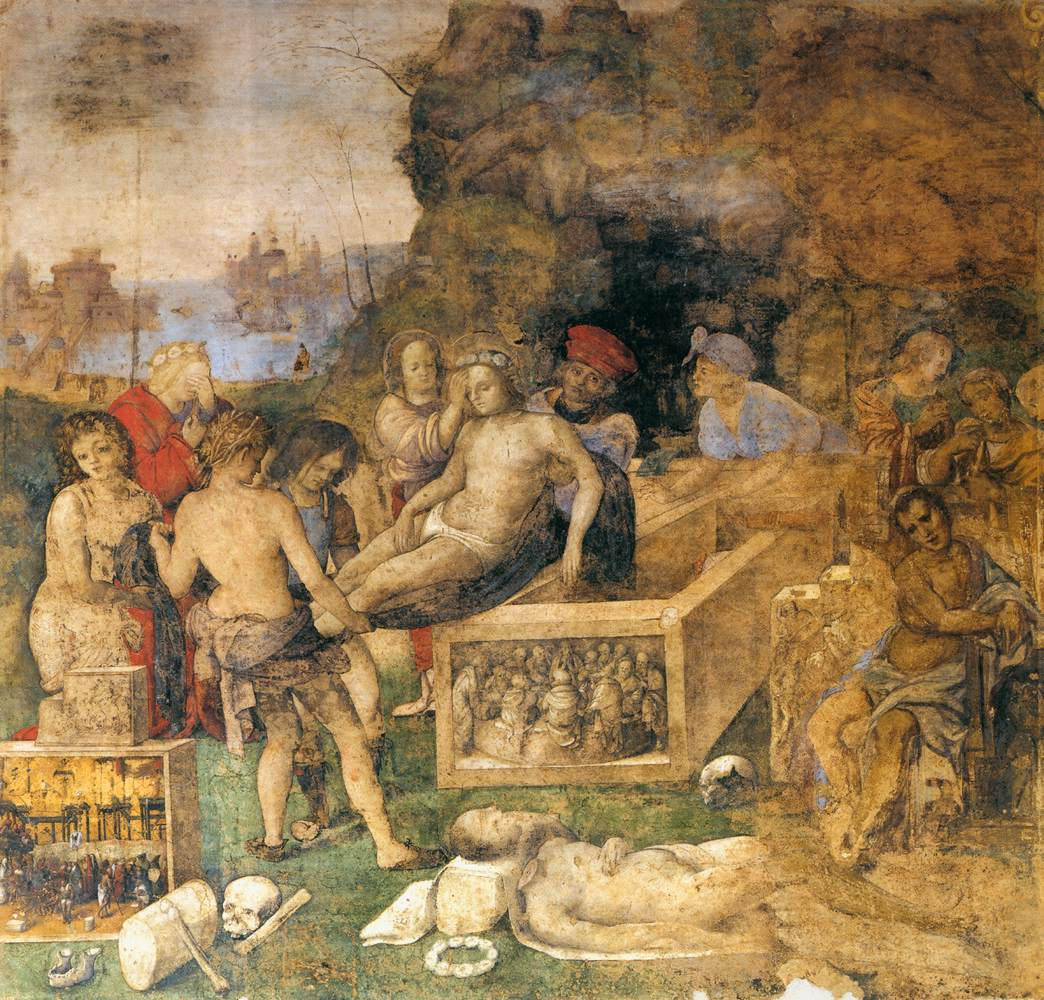
Burial of Valerian and Tiburtius, by Aspertini

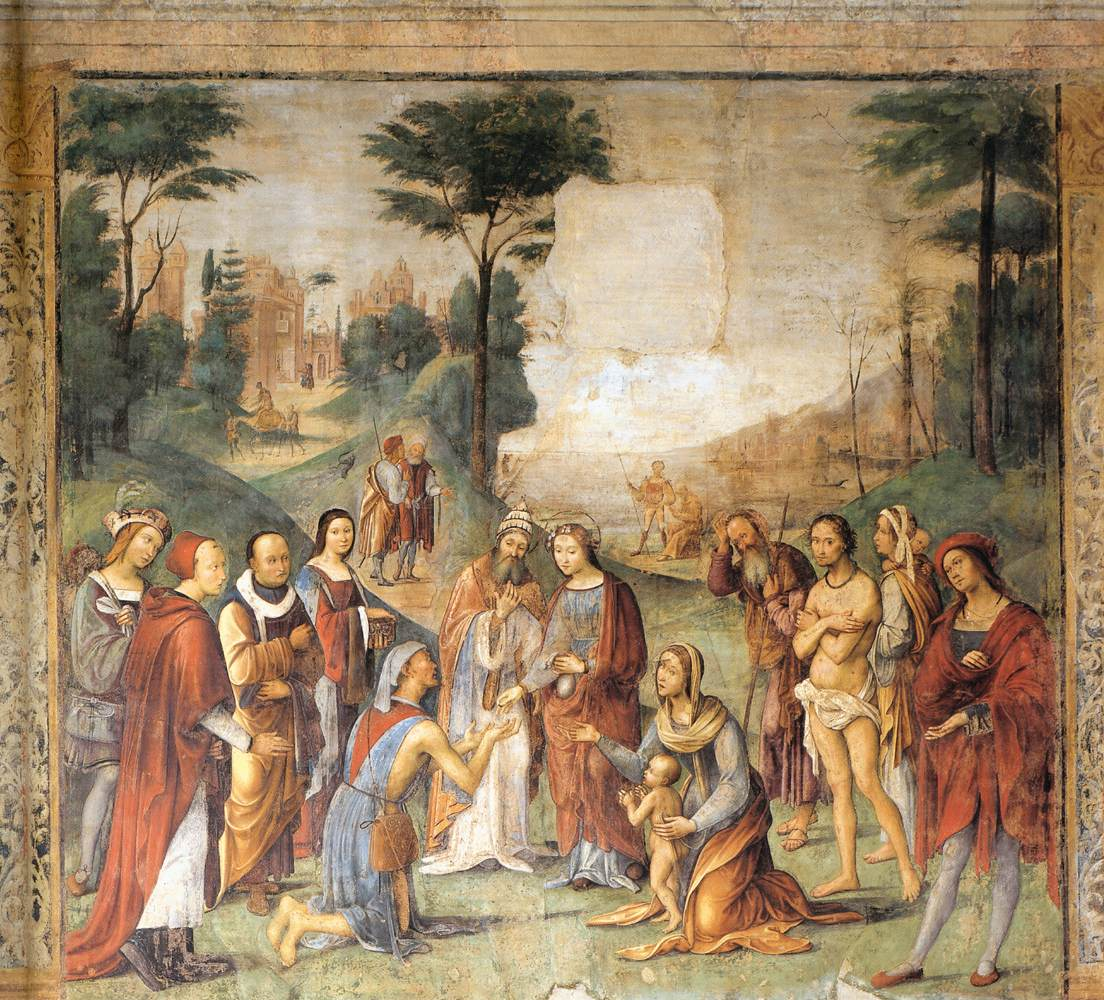
Charity of St Cecilia by Costa

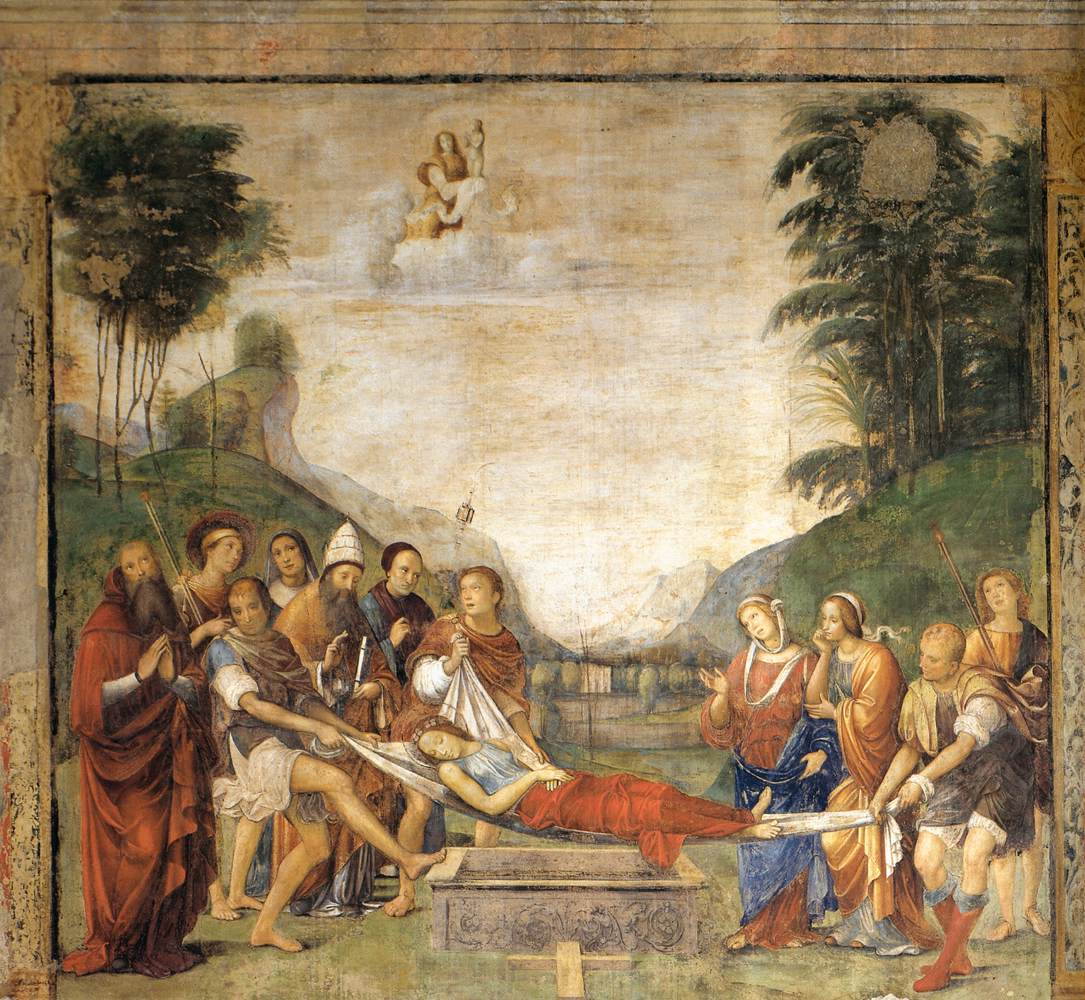
Burial of St Cecilia, by Francia
