= Raibolini =

Raibolini is an Italian surname. Notable people with the surname include:

- Francesco Raibolini (1450–1517), Italian painter
- Giacomo Raibolini (1484–1557), Italian painter
- Giulio Raibolini (1487–1540), Italian painter
