= Cesare Tamarozzo =

Italian painter

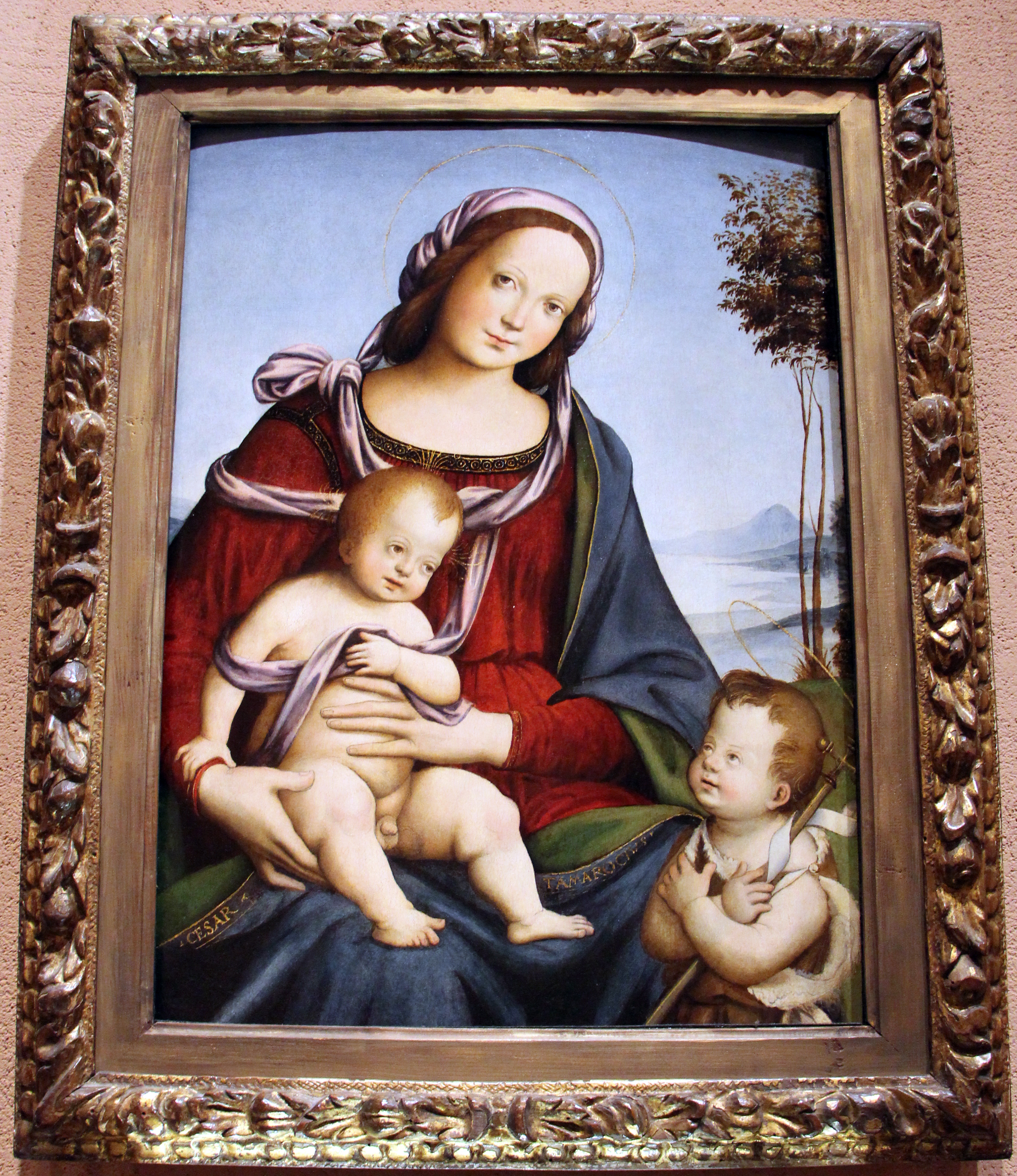
Madonna in the Museo Poldi Pezzoli

Cesare Tamarocci or Tamarozzo or Tamaroccio was an Italian painter of the School of Bologna, active during the early 16th century, the pupil of Francesco Francia.

In 1504–1506, the Chapel of Santa Cecilia in Bologna was frescoed with ten panels by the painters Aspertini, Francesco Francia, Chiodarolo, Lorenzo Costa, and Tamarocci. The Baptism of Valerian and the Martyrdom of Cecilia by Pope Urban have been generally attributed to Tamarocci, also Corrado Ricci attributed the figures at the background to Chiodarolo, and other improbably assigned it to Giacomo Francia (died 1575). The supervision of the entire series of frescoes may have been led by Costa. A Madonna and Child, with young St John is in Museo Poldi Pezzoli in Milan.
