= Adoration of the Shepherds (Raphael) =

Possible lost drawing by Raphael

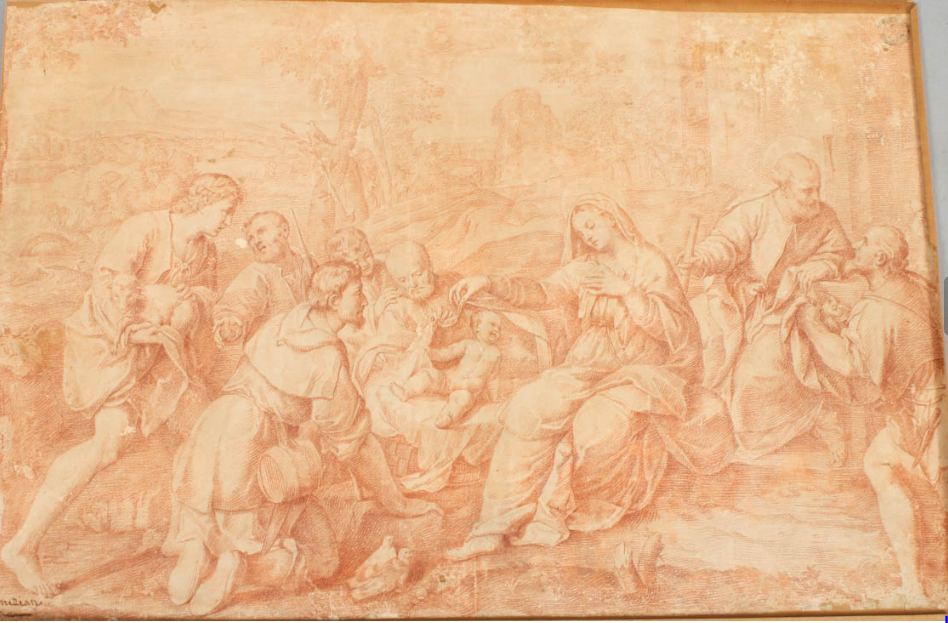
Adoration of the Shepherds, a copy of a painting by Bonifacio Veronese, but mistakenly attributed a tergo to Raphael, 1508

Adoration of the Shepherds is the title of a lost drawing by Raphael, described in a letter of 8 September 1508, from Raphael to his friend Francesco Raibolini alias Francesco Francia. This letter's contents were first published in 1678, in Carlo Cesare Malvasia's book Felsina Pittrice. Malvasia gave a full account of the letter, which he claimed to have found among the papers of Count Antonio Lambertini in Bologna. While the existence and contents of the letter are disputed, according to Malvasia it described the delivery of a drawing of the Adoration of the Shepherds to Francesco Francia. This drawing has been considered lost or never to have existed.

== Provenance ==
This piece, mistakenly claimed to be Raphael's Adoration of the Shepherds is 359 millimetres (14.1 in) by 502 millimetres (19.8 in), on paper, executed in red-chalk on an underlying metal point sketch. It has a collector's stamp in the upper right corner, which indicates that it was once part of a collection donated to the library of Urbania, region of Marche, Italy in 1667 by Count Bernardino Ubaldini. The Collezione Ubaldini consisted of a large number of drawings and prints of varying quality. The custodians of the library at the time, the religious order of the Caracciolini, pasted the drawings into two different books; Baldus de Ubaldis' Consilia from 1490, and Alexander Imolensis' Consilia, Lione edition from 1549. These two volumes are preserved, although the collection has been dismantled. The drawing was not part of Collezione Ubaldini during the great inventory of 1837. If Raphael's Adoration of the Shepherds drawing had been a part of the collection it is not known when or why it was separated.

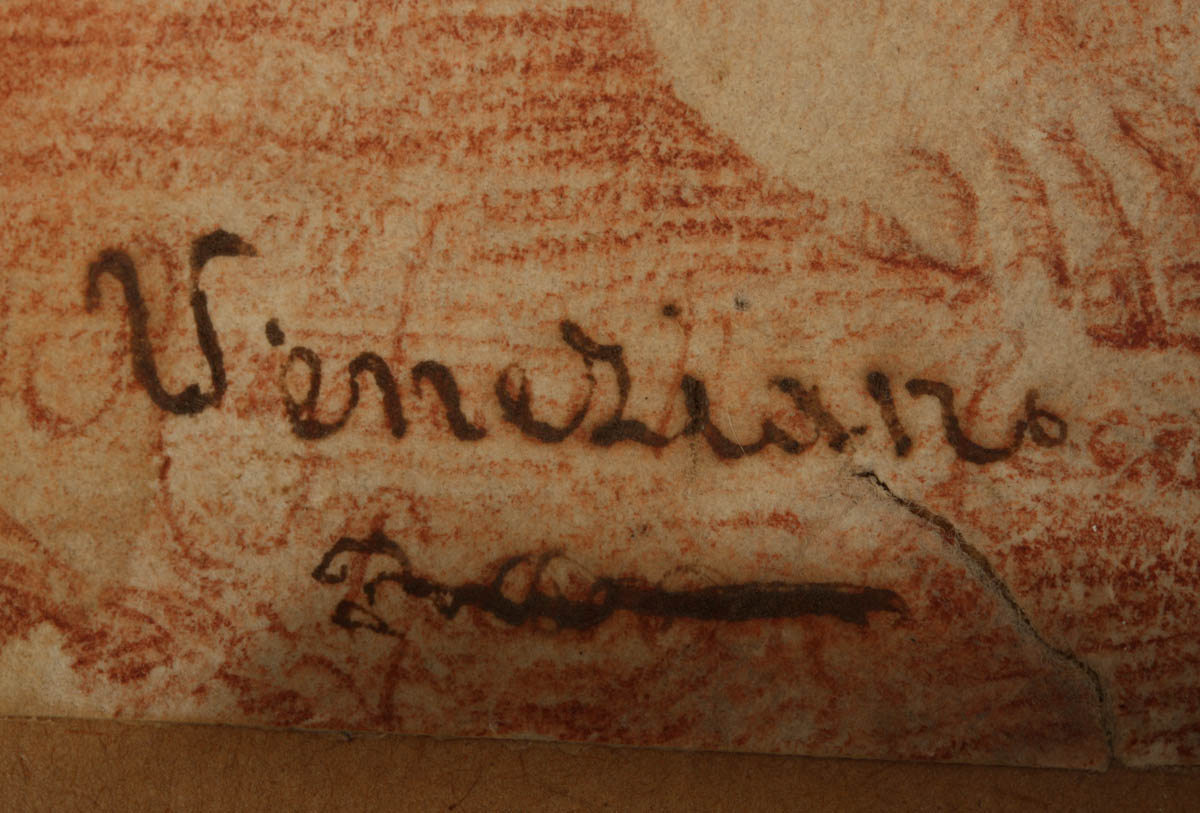
Signature, "Raphaello Fecit"

The drawing is signed "Raphaello Sancio fecit." An additional illegible word is written below this signature. The signature has been crossed over and a reattribution has been added: "Veneziano." The drawing has a short text on the verso side, not all of which is legible but which reads: "Nr 32 questo disegno Appartiene a Lambertini prospero […] dalla esegui che dicesi esser quello che Raffaello Regalo al Mag. Francia cio é per traduzione(?) di quello che lo stesso esegui)." The number may refer to the piece's collection number in the Ubaldini Collection. However the attribution to Veneziano is construed as the art work being of the Venetian style, and not an attribution.

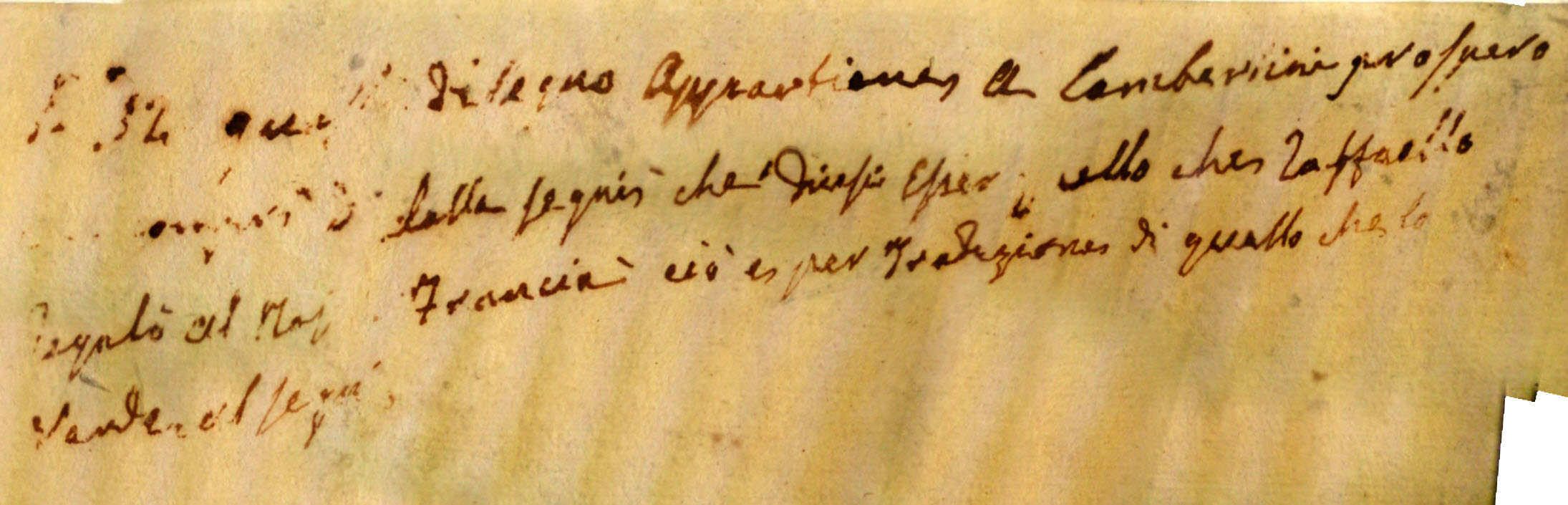
Verso, Adoration of the Shepherds, attribution possibly ca: 1730-1740

In 1678, when Malvasia published a history of painting in Bologna titled Felsina Pittrice, he included a transcript of a letter which he claimed to have seen. This letter was sent from Raphael in Rome in 1508 to his friend Francesco Francia in Bologna. In the letter Raphael wrote: “In Mean while I send to you by this same messenger, who will be going back in six days, another drawing, viz an Adoration of the Shepherds (presepe), which, as you will see, differs very much from the picture I painted, and of which you were kind enough to speak in such favourable terms”. In 1925, Francesco Filippini published a history of Raphael's visit to Bologna in 1506–1507, Raffaello a Bologna. Filippini concluded, based on the specificity of names and dates, that the letter's contents and date are authentic. The painting referred to in the letter is regarded as lost, possibly destroyed in a fire of the Bentivoglio estate when the papal troops invaded Bologna. Malvasia did not see the drawing, but only the letter referencing it.

== Technique ==
Raphael's technique was to create a quick preparatory stylus sketch on prepared paper before working in chalk. Ames-Lewis refers to Raphael's final drawing technique as “tight and incisive." He describes one such modello for the Massacre of the Innocents: “The final modello, on which these experiments in red chalk were brought together in preparation for the engraver's work, is a precise and highly worked and therefore rather impersonal drawing. Marcantonio Raimondi followed almost line for line the pen and ink hatchings, which spread much more consistently over the figures than in earlier compositional drafts.” Ames-Lewis concludes that Raphael's style, in which forms are generated by generic repeated contours, internal modelling is briefly indicated by quick flecks of hatching, and deeper shadows are represented by bolder parallel hatched lines, had matured by 1508.

To economize, Raphael reused ideas and sketches, sometimes years after the fact. According to Ames-Lewis: “A figure which he studied carefully for use in one context but the rejected as no longer suitable to the way the design had evolved, may reappear in another similar context.” The kneeling shepherd bears a similarity to the lame man in the Healing of the Lame Man from 1516, as seen in the cartoon, now in the Victoria and Albert Museum, including a barrel at the figure's waist. A similar barrel appears in the Metropolitan Museum of Art's engraving of the Adoration of the Shepherds, engraved in Bologna by School Marcantonio Raimondi after a design by Raphael. The popularity of Raphael was very great and many copies of Raphael 's figures worked their way in to the art of many artists.

In many of his sketches, Raphael used and reused the staff in his studio as references. These models, or garzone, were not always featured in the final versions of the painting, as is evident in the Borghese Deposition study currently in the British Museum, suggested to be from around 1508. The draped person carrying the torso of the Christ was not used in the final version of Raphael's The Deposition. This garzone does appear to be used in Adoration of the Shepherds. This same garzone, identified by his distinct nose and ear, his beard, his hairstyle, and his clothing, may be carrying the torso of Adonis in the drawing Death of Adonis, from ca 1508, in the Ashmolean Museum. They share a similar nose, beard, and headband. On the verso side of this drawing, referred to as Adam Tempted, is a sketch of an infant reclining backward and resting on his left arm, while lifting his right arm. Johannides mentions that this child is taken from Bellini's Virgin with the Sleeping Child on a Parapet at the (Gardner Museum). However this small figure also bears however a likeness to the infant Jesus in the purported Adoration of the Shepherds. In the Adoration of the Shepherds, the child is awake, with his face turned towards the Virgin. Her hand is at her bosom instead of supporting his head. The Virgin in the drawing also bears a similarity to the one rendered in Raphael's Madonna of the Goldfinch.

== Composition ==
Raphael's Adoration of Shepherds diverges from the traditional presentation of this scene, with shepherds in silent adoration of the infant Jesus, by putting almost all of the shepherds in some sort of active discourse. They talk with each other, and Joseph takes an active role in directing them. As Passavant wrote after studying the 13 arcades in the Vatican loggias, which Raphael and his artists made in 1519, “This is perhaps the only design in which Joseph is in action, he is generally merely a passive spectator.” Raphael's 1508 drawing of Adoration of the Shepherds would predate the loggias, painted in 1519, and may have inspired the more active portrayal of Joseph.

The theme of the kneeling shepherd with a barrel at his waist also appears in Titian's painting of The Holy Family with a Shepherd, dated to 1510, currently in the National Gallery of London. Titian's kneeling shepherd is on both knees, and supporting himself on one arm. The shepherd's stance is repeated in Murillo's Adoration of the Shepherds, dated to 1665–1670, in the Wallace Collection. Giorgione's Adoration of the Shepherds dated to 1510, in the National Gallery of Art, includes both the kneeling shepherd and the shepherd stepping into the scene.

Later in the 16th and 17th century a number of artists use a similar portrayal of the adoration, including the presentation of one kneeling shepherd and one stepping into the picture, among which was Bonifazio Veronese, from whom this drawing is a copy. An Adoration of the Shepherds currently in the Pitti Palace, attributed to Titian and dated to around 1533, uses this new design. Parmigianino also uses a composition of a shepherd stepping into the picture in his Adoration of the Shepherds.

== Discussion ==
Although there are indications that this drawing could be Raphael's design, it is clearly of the Venetian style. The active composition of the design is very different from designs of the period, however a painting of exactly this design has been found by Bonifazio Veronese. It can be argued that this design is related to the Raphael Rooms in the Vatican, as some of the compositions in the Adoration of the Shepherds occur in those compositions. It can also be argued that many of the features of this drawing belong to the traits of the early 16th century. Raphael used a goldfinch perched in the tree in Madonna and the goldfinch, currently in the Uffizi Gallery and dated to 1505–1506. However, after the early 16th century Raphael did not appear to use the goldfinch again. Details of the composition including the fully kneeling shepherd, the second shepherd stepping in, the active Joseph, and the Virgin with her hand on her bosom, became common in depictions of the Adoration of the Shepherds later in the 16th and 17th centuries. Raphael's drawing of the Adoration of the Shepherds is still lost and a mystery.
