= Giovanni Maria Chiodarolo =

Italian painter

Giovanni Maria Chiodarolo was an Italian painter from Bologna who lived in the 15th century. Little further is known of him than that the fresco of Angel crowning St. Valerian and St. Cecilia, executed about 1504–1509, in the oratory of St. Cecilia, attached to San Giacomo Maggiore, in Bologna, is by tradition assigned to him. He painted there alongside Cesare Tamarozzo. Other frescoes in the oratory were done by Francia, Amico Aspertini, and Lorenzo Costa the Elder. A Nativity in the Bologna Gallery is also ascribed to Chiodarolo.
