= Biagio Pupini =

Italian painter

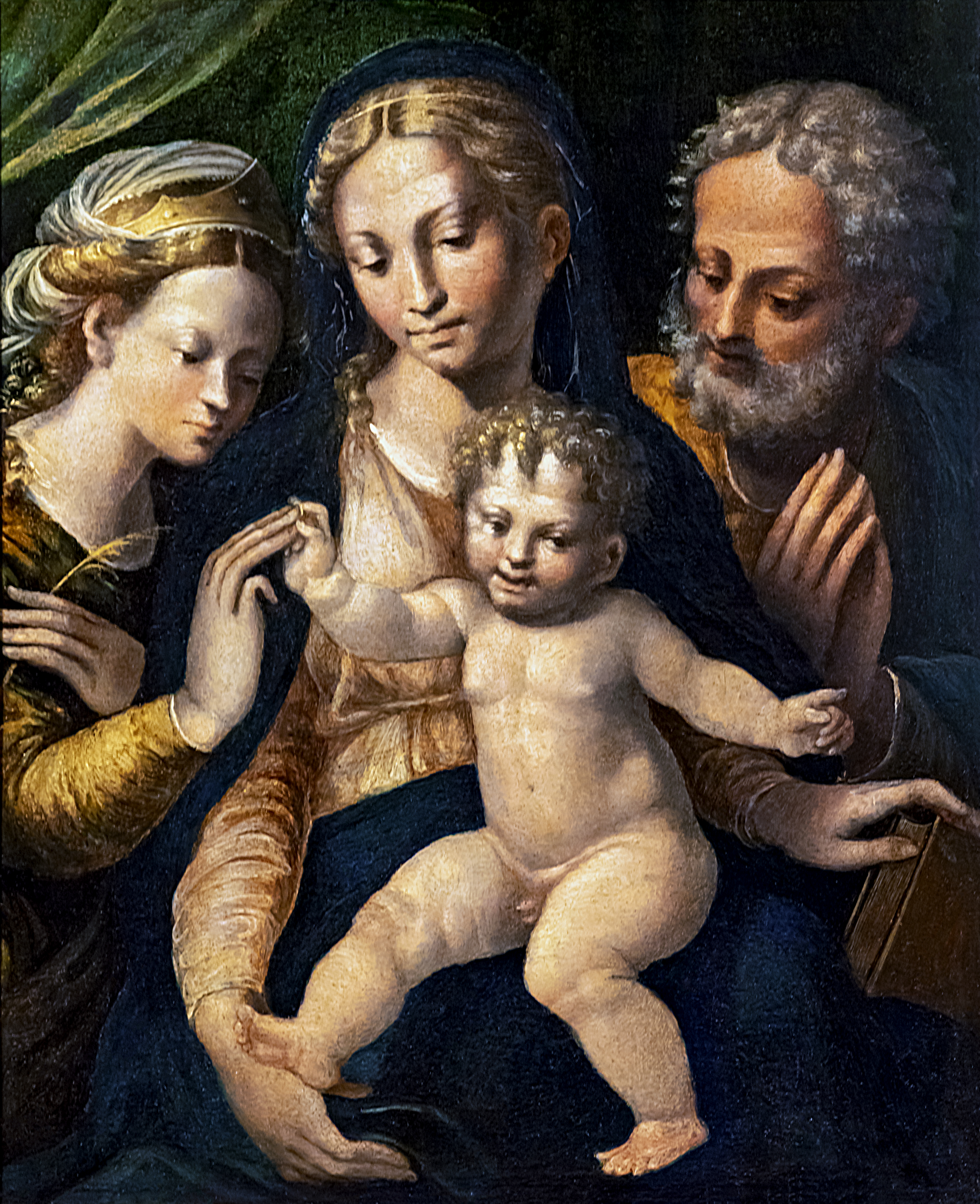
Mystic Marriage of Saint Catherine in Ca' Rezzonico in Venice

Biagio Pupini (c. 1490 – c. 1575) was an Italian painter of the Renaissance period, active mainly in his native city of Bologna. He was known to be active mainly during 1530–1540. He was a disciple of Francesco Francia. He completed paintings for the church of San Giuliano, Basilica of San Giacomo Maggiore, and the church of Santa Maria della Baroncella.

== Works ==
- Madonna and Saint Ursula, Giacomo Maggiore church, Bologna
- Marriage of the Virgin, auctioned by Christie's in 2003 in Paris
- Virgin and Child, Dorotheum, Vienna
- Mystic Marriage of Saint Catherine, auctioned at Christie's in 2005 in New York
- Mystic Marriage of Saint Catherine, Musée Jeanne d'Aboville of La Fère
- Virgin and Child with Saints, auctioned at Christie's in 1998 in London
- Apparition of the Virgin, San Petronio (Saint Petronius) church, Bologna
- Frescoes at San Salvatore church, Bologna, worked with Bagnacavallo
- Lost frescoes from 1511 at the main chapel at Santa Maria delle Grazie church, Faenza, also worked with Bagnacavallo.
- Diogenes and Alexander
