= Cesare Baglioni =

Italian painter

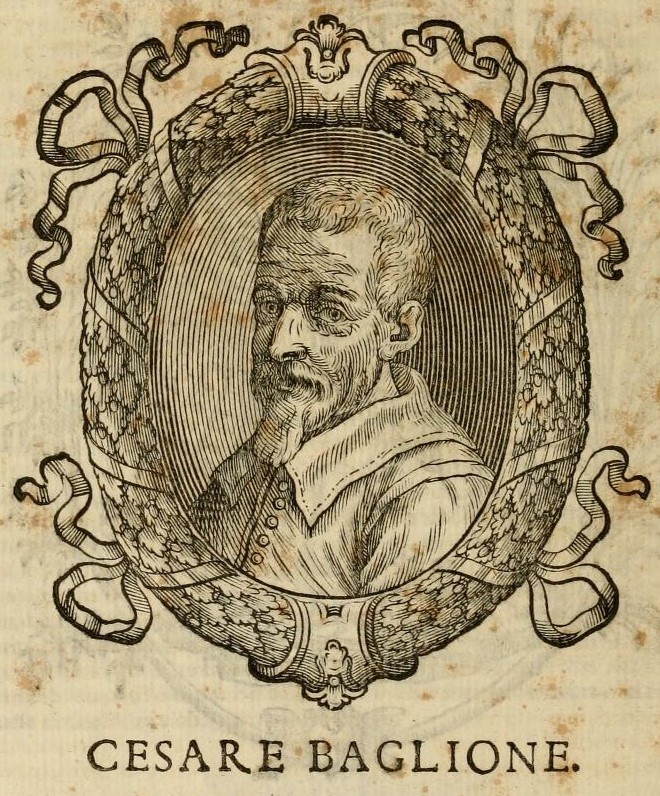
- Born: 1550s Cremona
- Died: 1615; Parma

Cesare Baglioni (c. 1525–1590, born in Bologna) was an Italian painter of the Renaissance period. He trained under his father, then became renowned as a painter of quadratura. He painted in Parma and Rome. He befriended both Agostino and Annibale Carracci. Leonello Spada apprenticed with Baglioni.

== Works ==
- Decorated rooms of the Villa Malenchini Fortuny, Carignano
- Involved in frescoing the Oratorio di Santa Cecilia, Bologna
