= Santa Cristina, Bologna =

Monastery and church in Bologna, Italy

Coordinates: 44.4887°N 11.3548°E

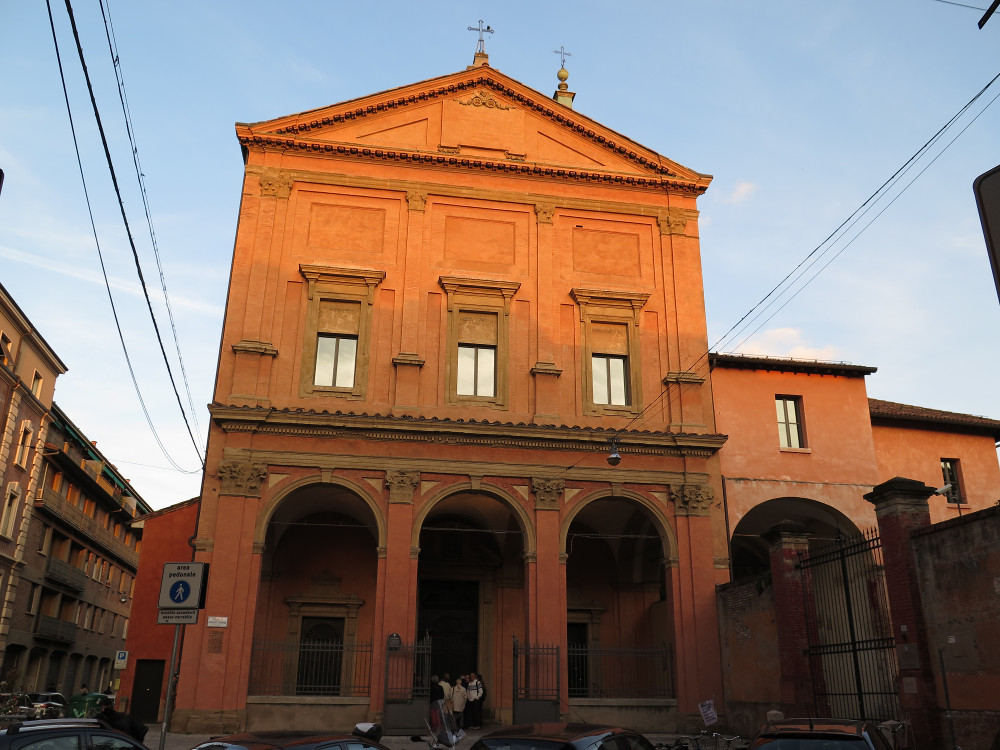
Facade of church

Santa Cristina or Santa Cristina della Fondazza is a deconsecrated Roman Catholic church and adjacent former convent, located on Piazzetta Morandi in central Bologna, region of Emilia Romagna, Italy. Since 2007, the barrel-vaulted church has served as a performance hall for concerts, mainly of choir and classical formats, while the convent houses the Department of Visual Arts of the University of Bologna.

== History ==
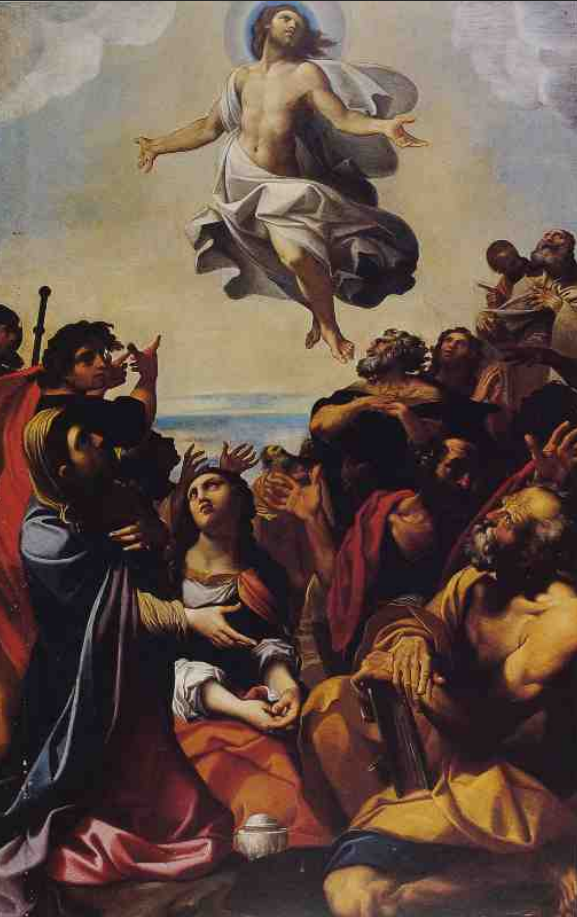
Ascension of Christ, main altarpiece by L. Carracci

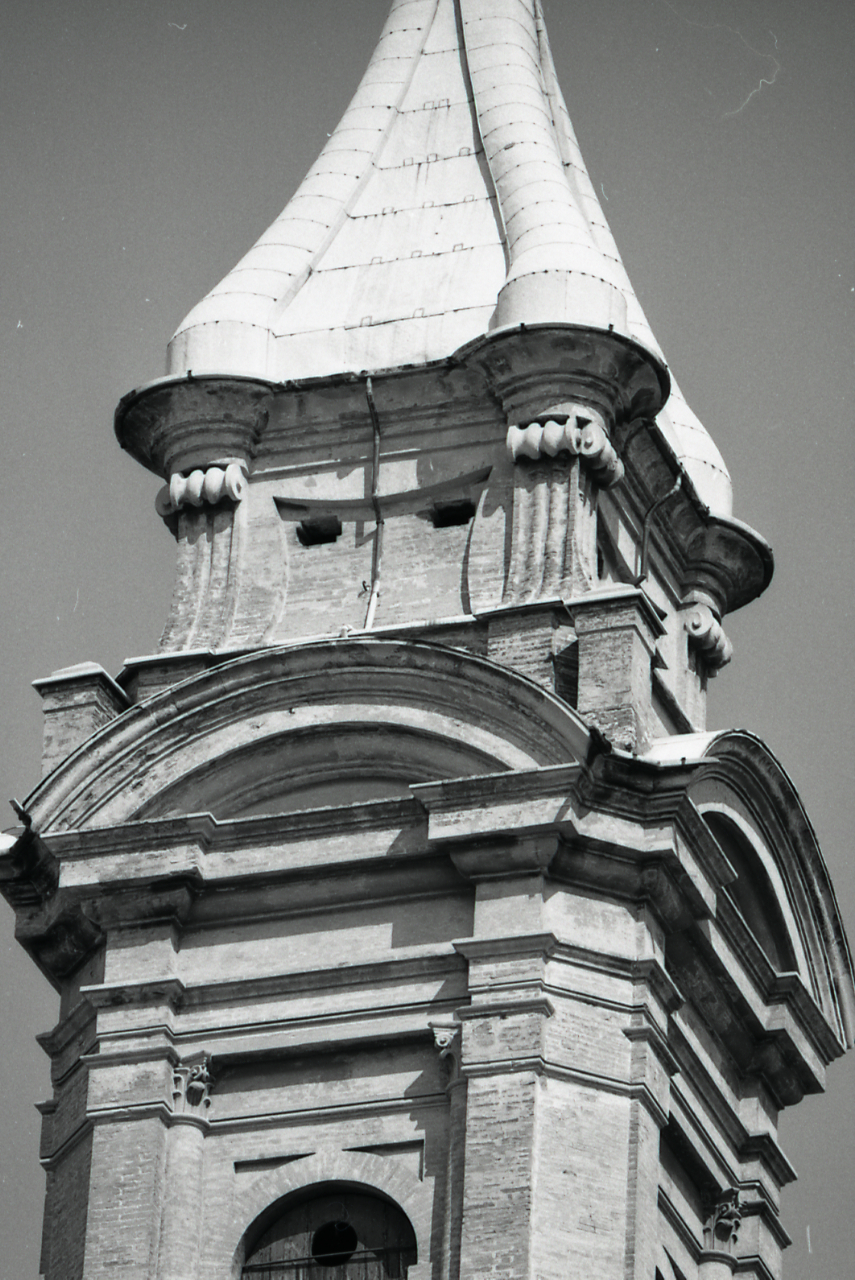
Detail of the bell tower.

A church at the site was putatively established at the site in 1247 by Camaldolese nuns. The present church was erected in 1602 by Giulio della Torre, a pupil of Domenico Tibaldi. By the Napoleonic era, the church was used for a time as barracks. The church has two sculptures of St Peter and St Paul by Guido Reni, known almost exclusively for his paintings. The main altarpiece is an Ascension of Christ by Ludovico Carracci. Other sculptures in the church were completed by Giuseppe Maria Mazza and G. Fiorini and paintings by Giacomo Francia (Nativity, c. 1552); Francesco Salviati (Madonna and Child with Saints, c. 1540); Lucio Massari (Visitation, 1607); Bernardino Baldi (Coronation of the Virgin, before 1615); and Bartolomeo Passerotti (Martyrdom of St Catherine) and his son Tiburzio (Annunciation and Christ carrying cross and St Veronica); Domenico Maria Canuti (St Cristina); Giovanni Battista Bertusio (Resurrection of Christ, early 17th-century); and Mastelletta.

The adjacent Camaldolese monastery is now the Department of Visual Arts of the University of Bologna. It houses a fresco of the Crucifixion by the school of Lorenzo Costa.

The hall of Santa Cristina is large, short chamber concerts, often using period instruments, are performed at San Colombano.
