= Villa Malenchini Fortuny, Carignano =

Rural palace in Parma, Italy

The Villa Malenchini Fortuny is a 16th-century rural palace located on Strada Felino in Vigatto #2 near Carignano in the province of Parma, region of Emilia-Romagna, Italy.

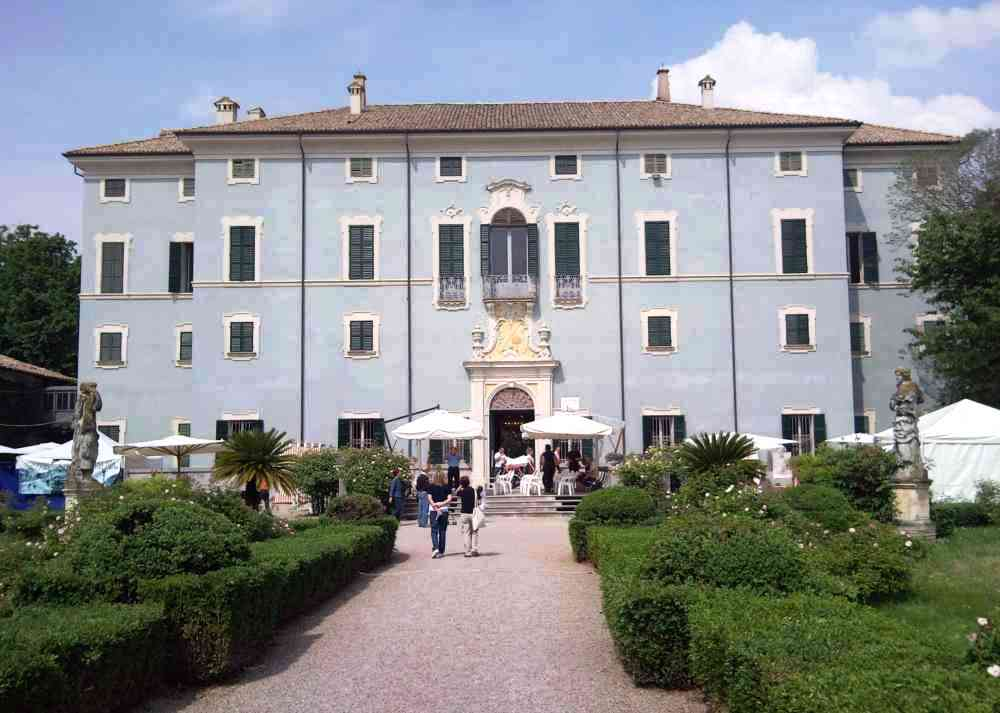
Villa Malenchini

== History ==
A residence was built at the site in the 16th century by the Marchesi Lampugnani. The rooms were decorated by Cesare Baglioni. In the 17th-century, lateral wings were added to the Villa. After the late 19th century the property was acquired by the aristocrat Eletta Fortunata Raggio (1874-1963), also surnamed Fortuny, wife of Luigi Malenchini, who created the English Gardens around the property, complete with fountains, nymphaeum, and chapel. The approach to the Villa is through a long line of shaped cypresses.
