= Amico Aspertini =

Italian painter

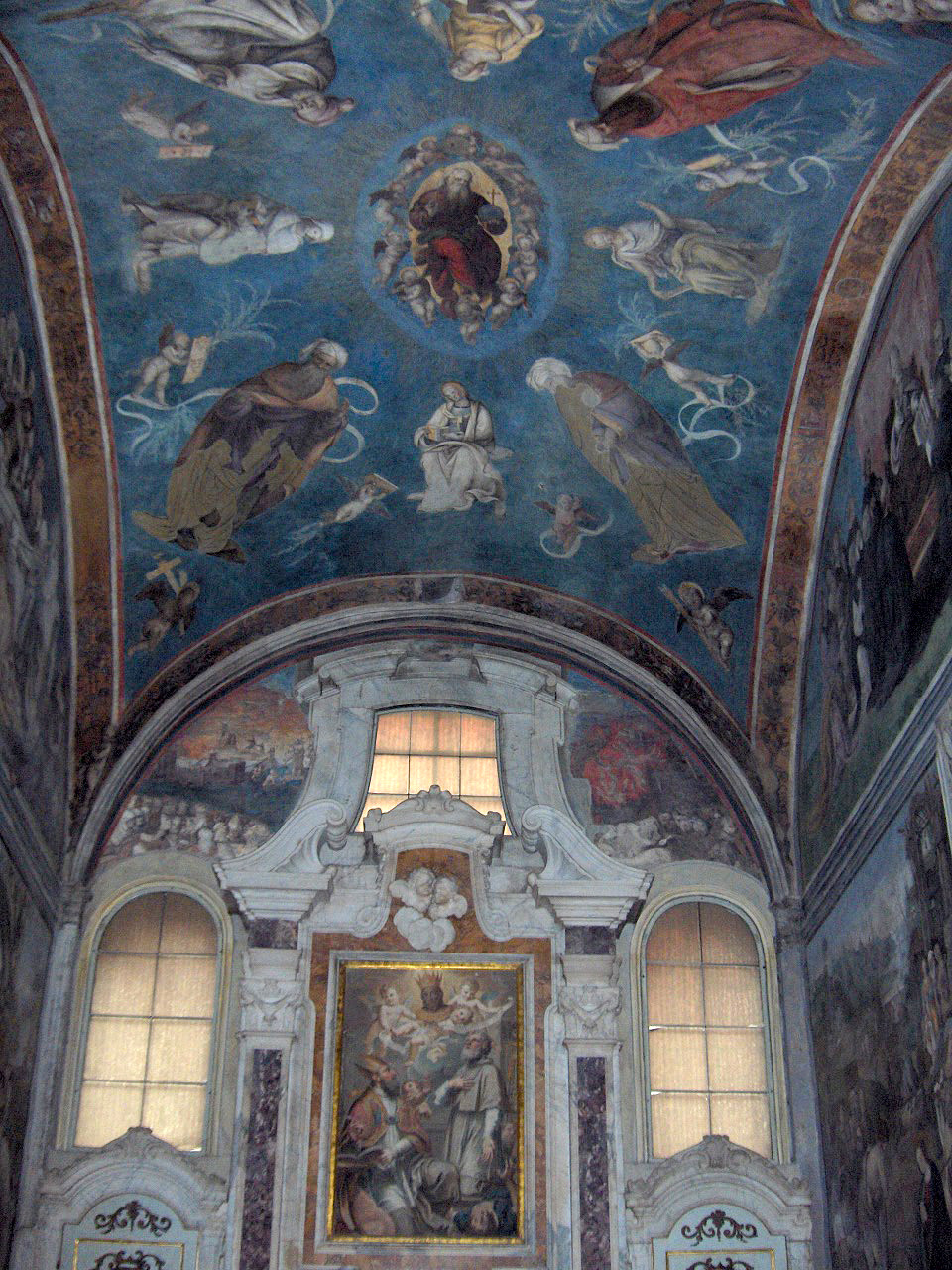
Vault of the Chapel of the Cross in the Basilica di San Frediano, Lucca, Italy.

Amico Aspertini, also called Amerigo Aspertini (ca 1474 – 1552), was an Italian Renaissance painter and sculptor whose complex, eccentric, and eclectic style anticipates Mannerism. He is considered one of the leading exponents of the Bolognese School of painting.

== Biography ==
He was born in Bologna to a family of painters (including Giovanni Antonio Aspertini, his father, and Guido Aspertini, his brother), and studied under masters such as Lorenzo Costa and Francesco Francia. He traveled to Rome with his father in 1496, and is briefly documented there again between 1500 and 1503, returning to Bologna thereafter and painting in a style influenced by Pinturicchio and Filippino Lippi (whose work the critic Roberto Longhi suggested [in Officina ferrarese, 1934] he may have seen in Florence before 1500). To his Roman years belong at least two collections of drawings, the "Parma Notebook" (Taccuino di Parma) and the Wolfegg Codex. In Bologna in 1504, he joined Francia and Costa in painting frescoes for the Oratory of Santa Cecilia next to San Giacomo Maggiore, a work commissioned by Giovanni II Bentivoglio.

In 1508–1509, while in exile from Bologna following the fall of the Bentivoglio family, Aspertini painted the splendid frescoes in the Chapel of the Cross in the Basilica di San Frediano in Lucca (a church, like the Oratory of Santa Cecilia, maintained by Augustinian friars). Aspertini was also one of two artists chosen to decorate a triumphal arch for the entry into Bologna of Pope Clement VII and Emperor Charles V in 1529. He produced sculptures for doors in San Petronio Basilica in Bologna. Aspertini also painted façade decorations (all now lost), and altarpieces. Many of his works are often eccentric and charged in expression. For example, the Pietà he painted inside San Petronio appears to occur in an other-worldly electric sky.

His Tuscan near-contemporary Giorgio Vasari described Aspertini (in The Lives) as having an eccentric, half-insane personality. According to Vasari, he was ambidextrous and worked so rapidly with both hands that he was able to divide chiaroscuro between them, painting chiaro with one hand and scuro with the other. Vasari also quotes Aspertini as complaining that all his Bolognese colleagues were copying Raphael.

He died in Bologna.

== Anthology of works ==
- Adoration of the Shepherds – Staatliche Museen, Berlin
- Adoration of the Shepherds (1515) – Uffizi, Florence
- Domus Aurea, Rome
- A Baptismal Ceremony – Vanderbilt University Fine Arts Gallery, Nashville, Tennessee
- Frescoes, Oratorio di Santa Cecilia, Bologna
- San Frediano, Lucca
- San Michele in Bosco, Bologna
- Pietà with Saint Mark, Ambrose, John the Evangelist, and Anthony Abbot (1519) – San Petronio, Bologna)
- Saint Sebastian, National Gallery of Art, Washington, DC
- Battle of the Amazons (Italy)
- Madonna and Child with Saints George, Joseph, John the Evangelist and Sebastian, Museo Nazionale di Villa Guinigi, Lucca
- San Giacomo Maggiore, Bologna
- Profile of a Hero (1496) – Christian Museum, Esztergom
- Madonna Enthroned with Saints, (c. 1515) – San Martino, Bologna
- Holy Family with Saints (after 1530) – Saint Nicolas des Champs, Paris

== Sources ==
- Francis P. Smyth and John P. O'Neill (Editors in Chief) (1986). National Gallery of Art, Washington DC (ed.). The Age of Correggio and the Carracci: Emilian Painting of the 16th and 17th Centuries. pp. 56–61.
- Freedberg, Sydney J. (1993). Pelican History of Art (ed.). Painting in Italy, 1500–1600. Penguin Books Ltd. pp. 404–409.
