= Giovanni di Ottonello =

Italian painter

Virgin and Child with Angelic Musicians fresco for the church of San Giacomo Maggiore, now on display in Pinacoteca Nazionale of Bologna

Giovanni di Ottonello (Bologna, active from 1375 to 1398) was an Italian painter of the Gothic period.

Little is known of his life. He painted a large fresco of the Virgin and Child with Angelic Musicians for the arcades of the church of San Giacomo Maggiore, now on display in Pinacoteca Nazionale of Bologna.
