= Bonifazio Veronese =

Italian painter (1487–1553)

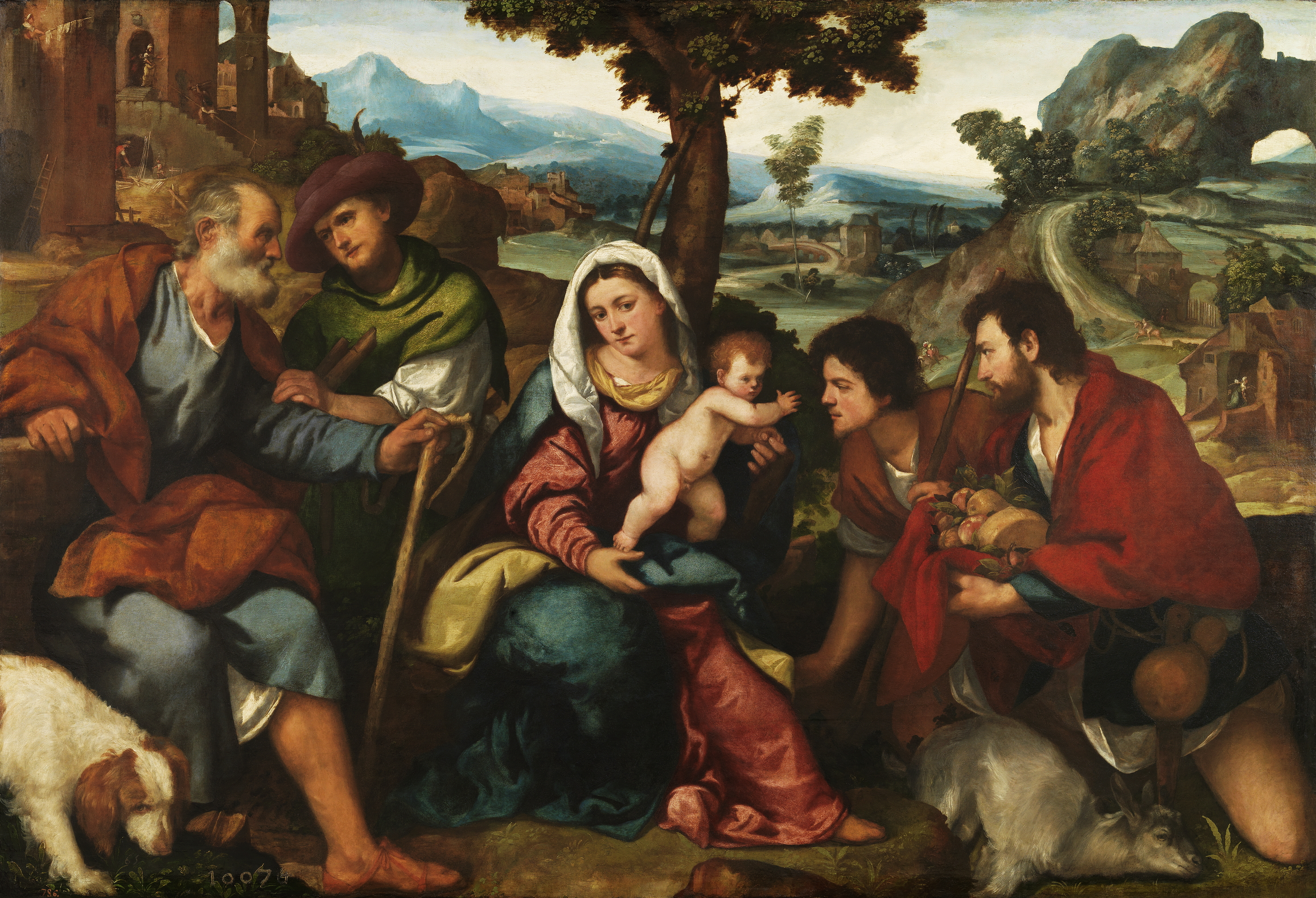
The Adoration of the Shepherds, Prado Museum, Madrid

Bonifazio Veronese, born Bonifazio de' Pitati (Note: Also spelled "Bonifacio") (1487 – 19 October 1553), was a Venetian Renaissance painter who was active in the Venetian Republic. His work had an important influence on the younger generation of painters in Venice, particularly Andrea Schiavone and Jacopo Tintoretto.

== Life ==
The artist was born in Verona from which his family moved to Venice around 1505. Here, the young artist reputedly trained under Palma il Vecchio. He was initially a close follower of il Vecchio. He ran a large workshop in Venice, which could execute small devotional works as well as large painting projects. His early work also shows his knowledge of Giorgione and Titian

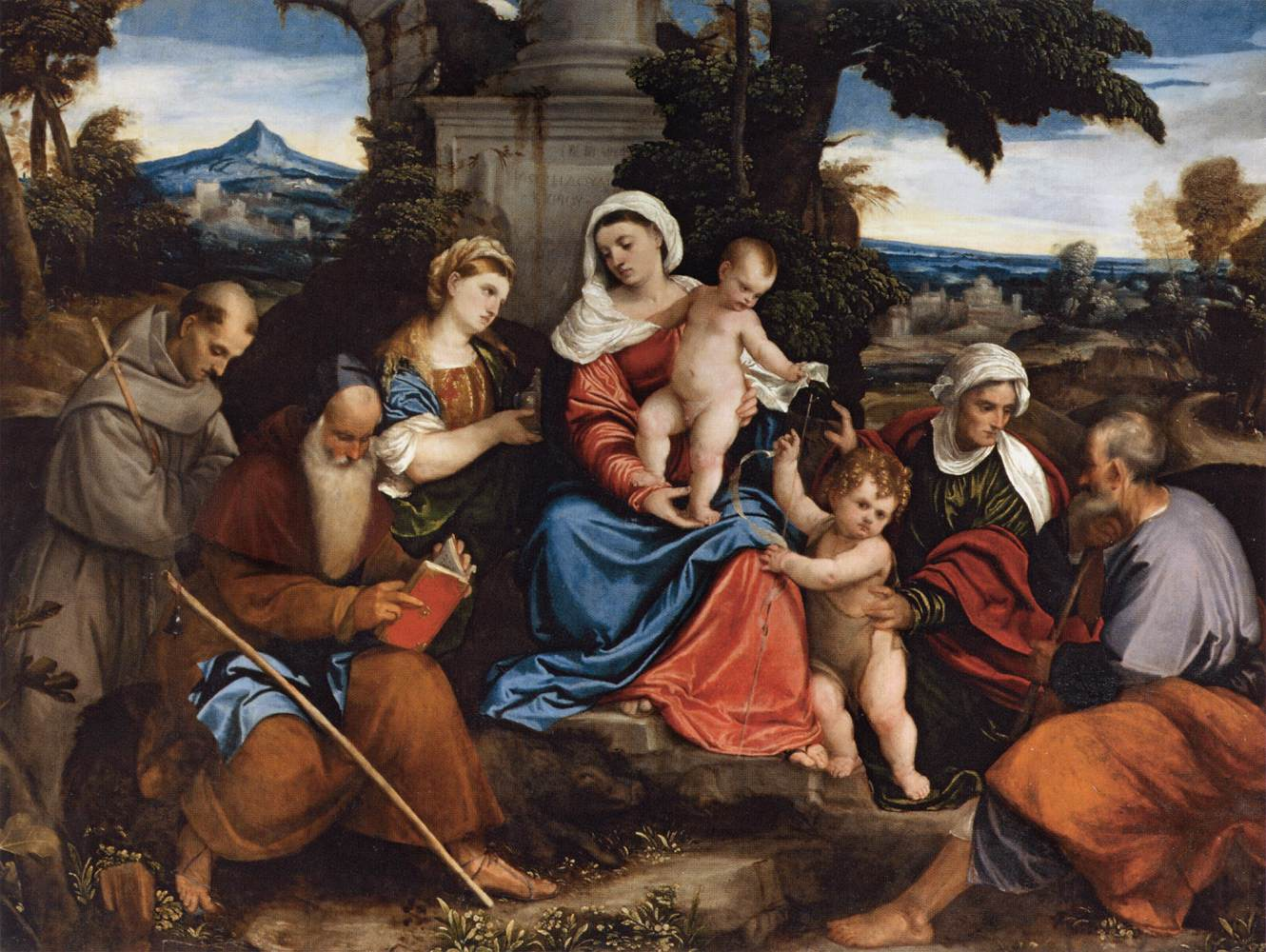
Holy Family with St. John the Baptist

He painted numbers of Sacra conversazioni centred on a Virgin and Child in a landscape, with variable other saints, using similar compositions. He created a large series of narrative paintings for the Palazzo dei Camerlenghi. It took 20 years to complete the project.

His style was influenced by that of Giorgione and Titian. From the 1530s the artist introduced some figurative elements of central Italian origin derived mainly from Raphael. During those years he made a fortune in Venice Many cassoni and furniture decorations are attributed to him.

He is said to have had a lasting influence on Andrea Schiavone and Tintoretto. He died in Venice.

== Works attributed to the artist ==
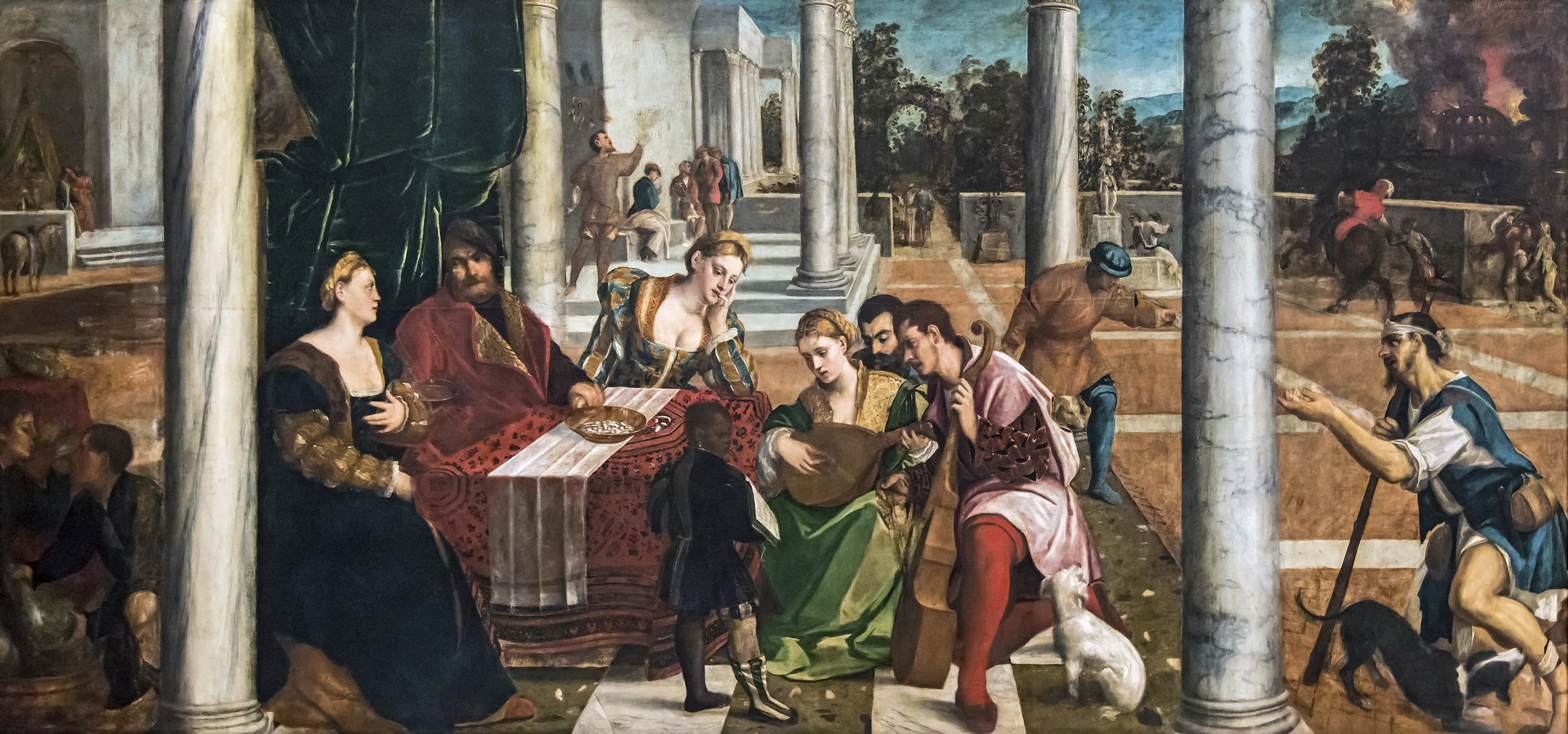
The rich man and Lazarus 1540 Gallerie dell'Accademia Venice

- Repose in Egypt (also ascribed to Paris Bordone), Pitti Palace.
- Sibyl with the Emperor Augustus (also ascribed to Paris Bordone).
- Finding of Moses (formerly attributed to Giorgione). Milan. Pinacoteca di Brera.
- Finding of Moses (formerly given Modena. Gall. Adoration of the Kings. to Giorgione).
- Holy Family (formerly called a Titian or Bordone, Colonna Palace, Rome.
- Christ and the Adulteress, National Museum, Warsaw.
- Holy Family with St. John the Baptist, Wawel Castle, Kraków.
- The rich man and Lazarus 1540 Gallerie dell'Accademia Venice
- The Adoration of the Kings, Petworth House
