= Giulio Raibolini =

Italian painter

Giulio Raibolini (1487–1540) also called Giulio Francia was an Italian painter of the Renaissance. He was the younger son and pupil of Francesco Raibolini. He worked jointly with his brother Giacomo on paintings.
