= Giacomo Raibolini =

Italian painter

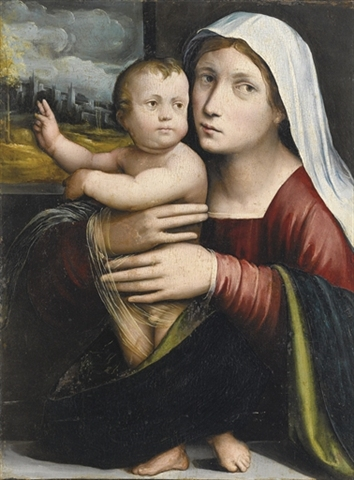
Giacomo Francia, (or Raibolini), Madonna and Child, oil on panel, 55 x 40 cm.

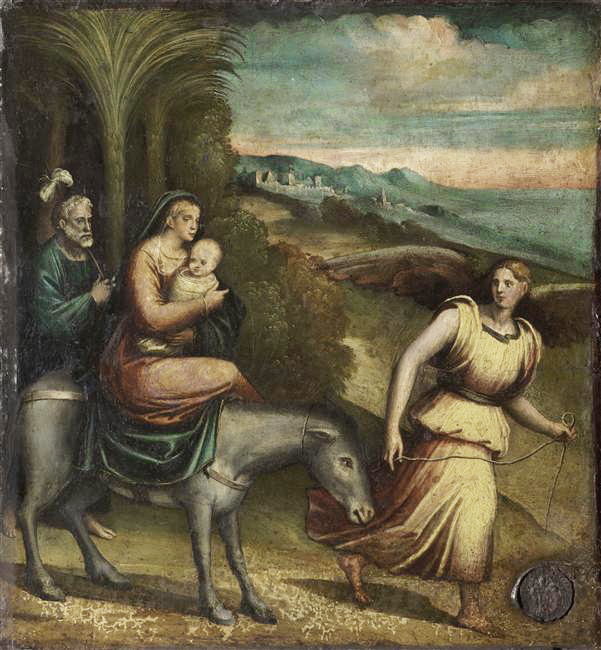
Giacomo Francia, Flight into Egypt, Palais des Beaux-Arts de Lille

Giacomo Raibolini (1484 – 3 January 1557), also called Giacomo Francia or Jacopo Francia, was an Italian painter and engraver of the Renaissance period.

Francia was born in Bologna as elder son of Francesco Raibolini (Francesco Francia), and like his father was also called il Francia. His father and brother Giulio Raibolini were also artists. Francia was trained by his father in painting and goldsmithing, and acted as his assistant. In 1517, the year of his father's death, he and his brother, Giulio, assumed responsibility for the family business and together executed many church altarpieces, identifiable by the initials (I I) of their Latinized names (Iacobus and Iulius). Late in life Giacomo came under the influence of Dosso Dossi. He died in Bologna in 1567.

Giacomo's earliest known work is the Virgin in Glory with Saints Peter, Mary Magdalene, Francis, Martha and Six Nuns (after 1515; Pinacoteca Nazionale, Bologna, ). In this painting, as in the Saints Jerome, Margaret and Francis (1518; Madrid, Prado) and the Nativity (1519; San Giovanni Evangelista, Parma), both dated and signed by both brothers, there appear, in addition to the influence of their father, echoes of the monumental style of Raphael.

Other paintings of Raibolini include:

- Works in Church of San Giovanni Evangelista, Parma.
- Baptism of Valerian and the Martyrdom of St Cecilia, frescoes, Oratorio di Santa Cecilia, Bologna
- Madonna seated with Saints Francis, Bernard, Sebastian, and Maurice (1526) in Bologna
- St Michael Archangel for the church of San Domenico, Bologna.
- Nativity (c. 1552), Santa Cristina, Bologna
