= Francesco Francia =

Italian painter, goldsmith, and medallist

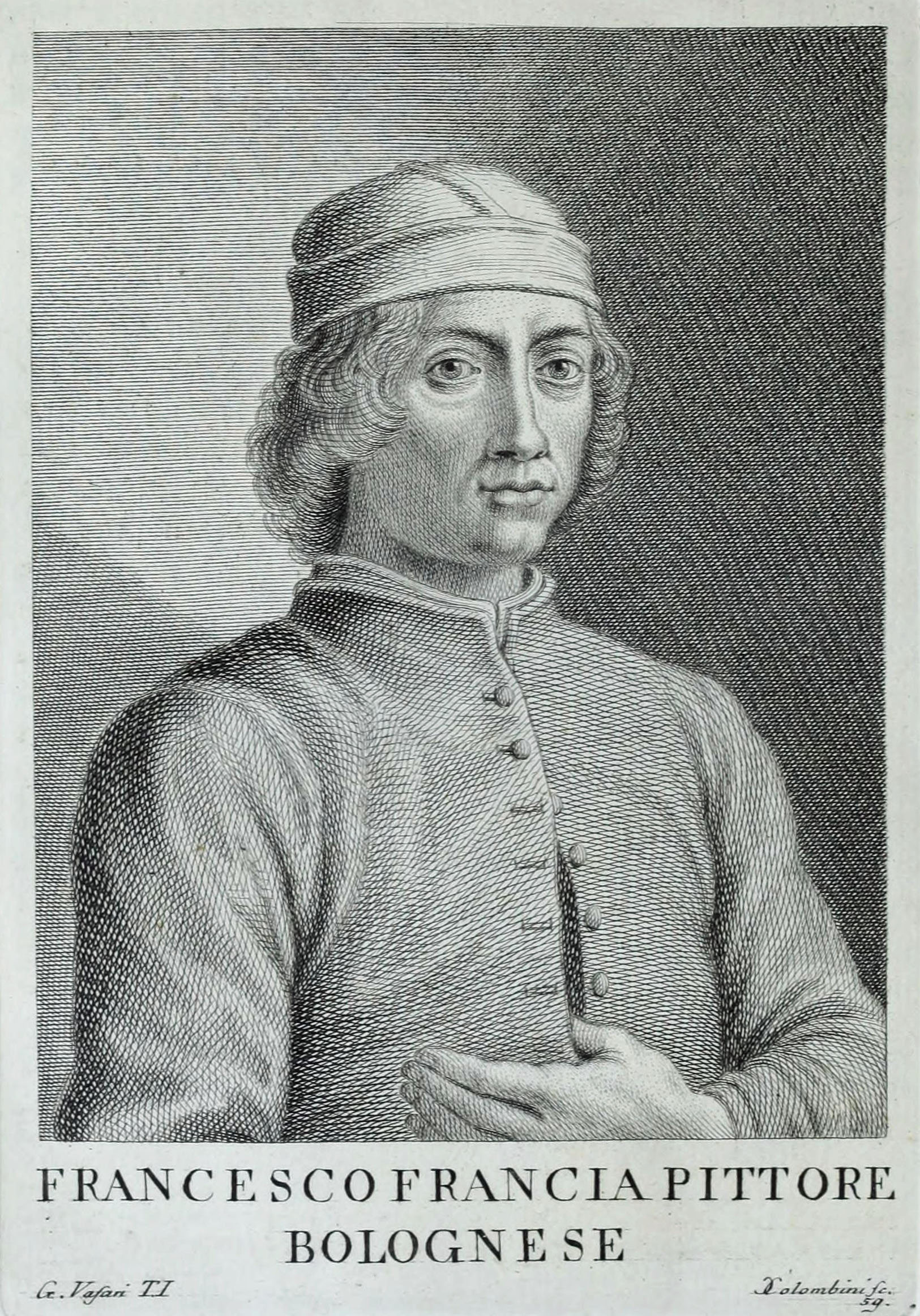
Francesco Francia

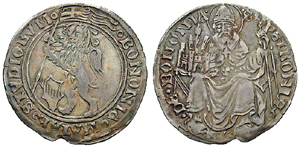
Bentivolio coin by Francesco Francia

Francesco Francia, whose real name was Francesco Raibolini (1447 – 5 January 1517), was an Italian painter, goldsmith, and medallist from Bologna, who was also director of the city mint.

== Biography ==
He may have trained with Marco Zoppo and was first mentioned as a painter in 1486. His earliest known work is the Felicini Madonna, which is signed and dated 1494. He worked in partnership with Lorenzo Costa, and was influenced by Ercole de' Roberti's and Costa's style. After 1505 he was influenced more by Perugino and Raphael. He had a large workshop and trained Marcantonio Raimondi, Ludovico Marmitta, and several other artists; he produced niellos, in which Raimondi first learnt to engrave, soon excelling his master, according to Vasari. Raphael's Santa Cecilia is supposed to have produced such a feeling of inferiority in Francia that it caused him to die of depression. However, as his friendship with Raphael is now well-known, this story has been discredited.

He died in Bologna. His sons Giacomo Francia and Giulio Francia were also artists.

== Works (selection of paintings) ==
=== Until 1500 ===
- Crucifixion with St. John and St. Jerome, c. 1485, 52 cm x 33 cm, oil on wood, Palazzo d'Accursio, Bologna
- The Holy Family, c. 1485, 54 cm x 40 cm, oil on wood, Gemäldegalerie, Berlin
- The Virgin and Child with an Angel, c. 1490, 58 cm x 44 cm, oil on wood, Carnegie Museum of Art, Pittsburgh
- Bartolomeo Bianchini, c. 1485–1500, 57 cm x 41 cm, oil on wood, National Gallery, London
- Baptism of Jesus, c. 1490, 29 cm x 55 cm, oil on wood, Calouste Gulbenkian Museum, Lisbon
- Madonna and Child with two Angels, c. 1495, 64 cm x 49 cm, oil on wood, Alte Pinakothek, Munich
- Pala Calcina, 1500, 193 cm x 151 cm, tempera and oil on canvas (formerly wood), Hermitage Museum, Saint Petersburg
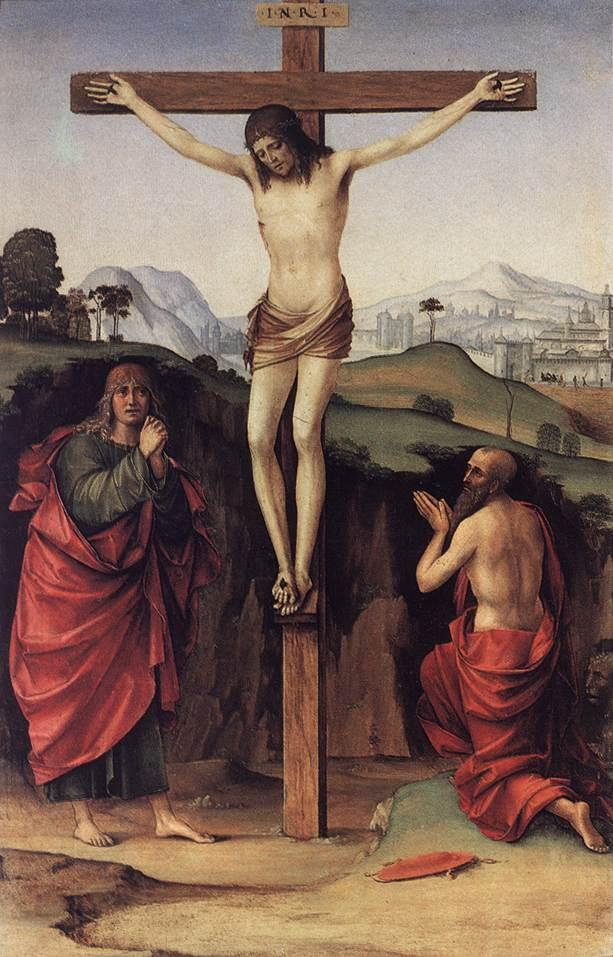
Crucifixion
c. 1485, Bologna

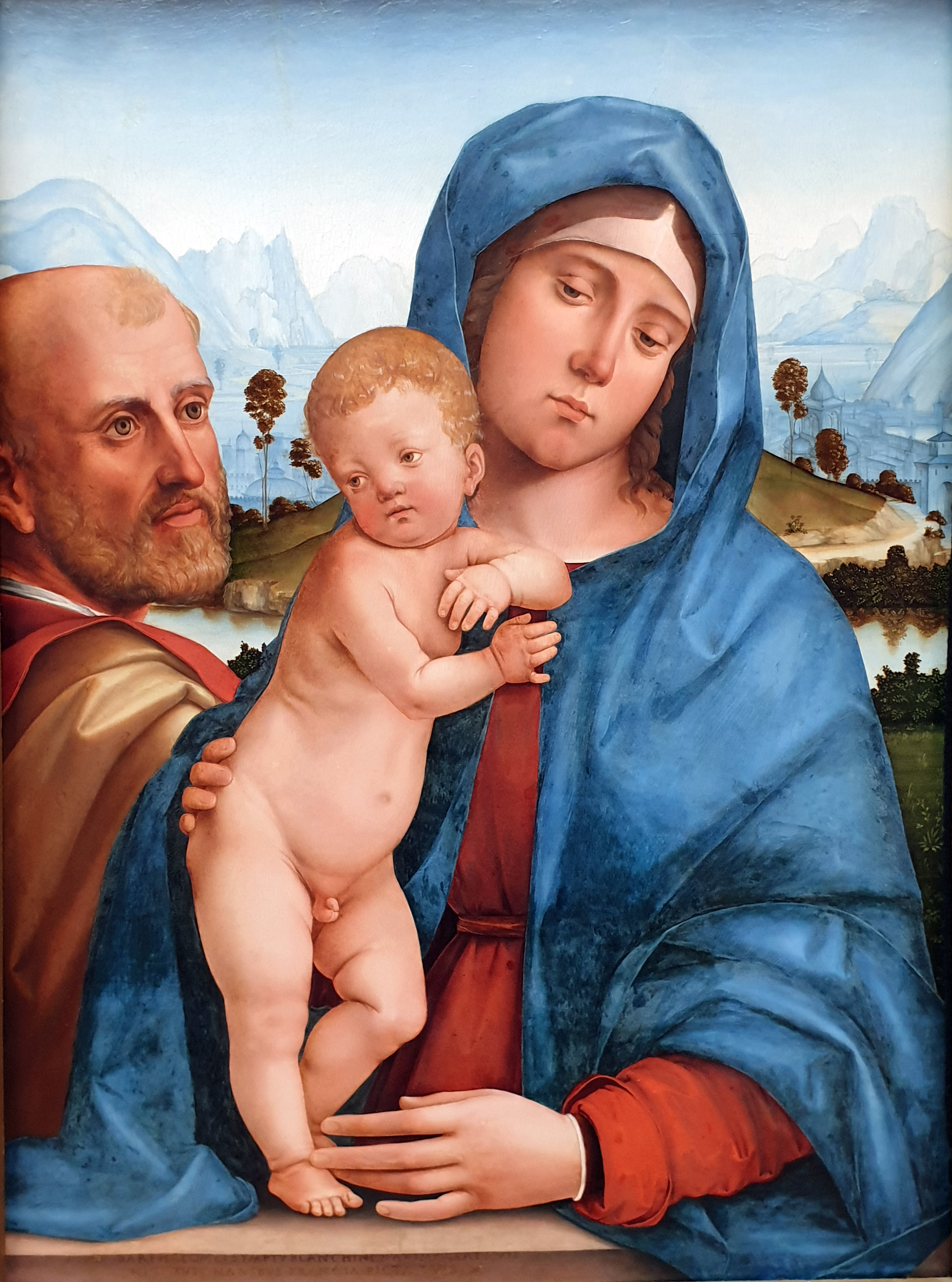
The Holy Family
c. 1485, Berlin

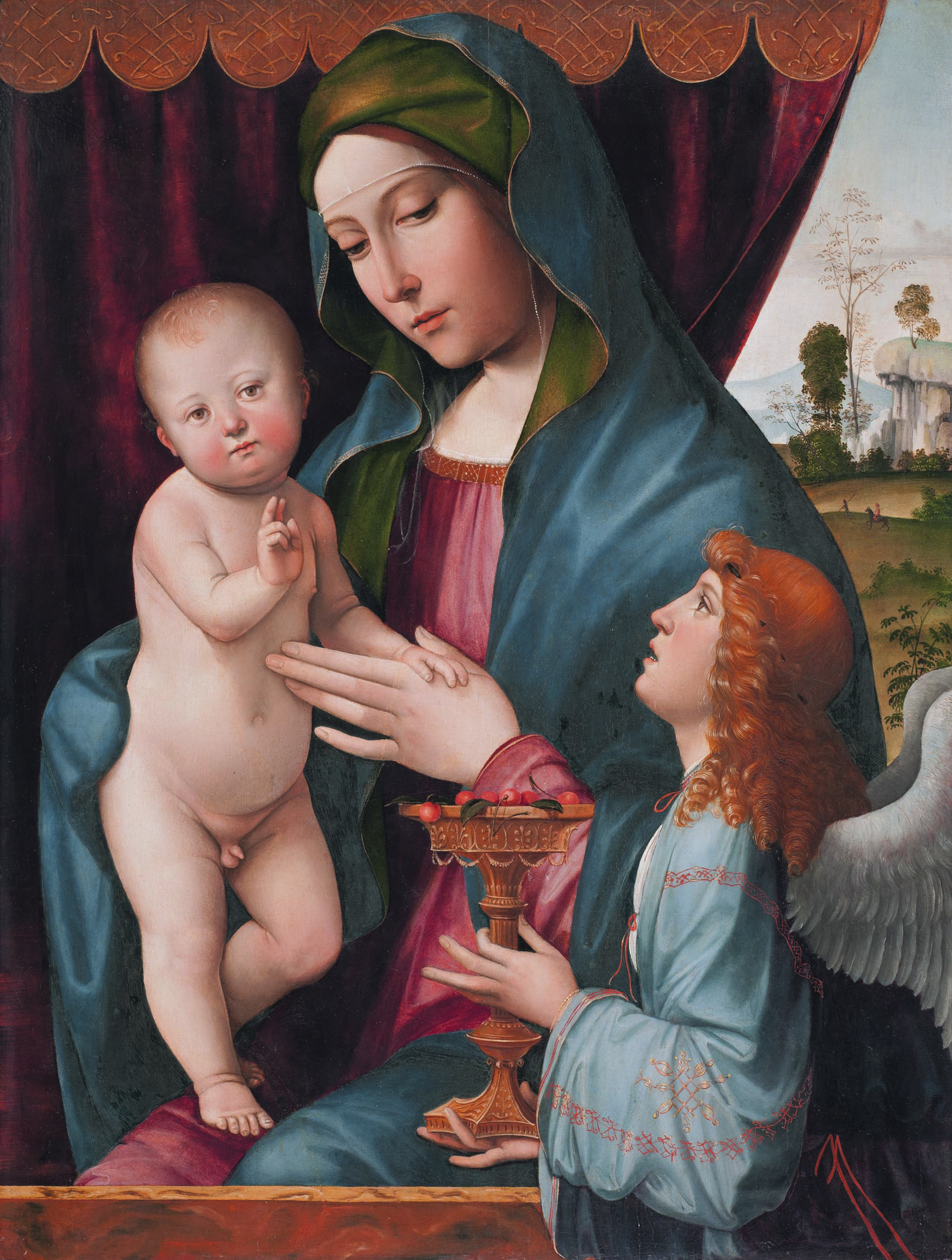
Madonna with Angel
1495-1500, Pittsburg

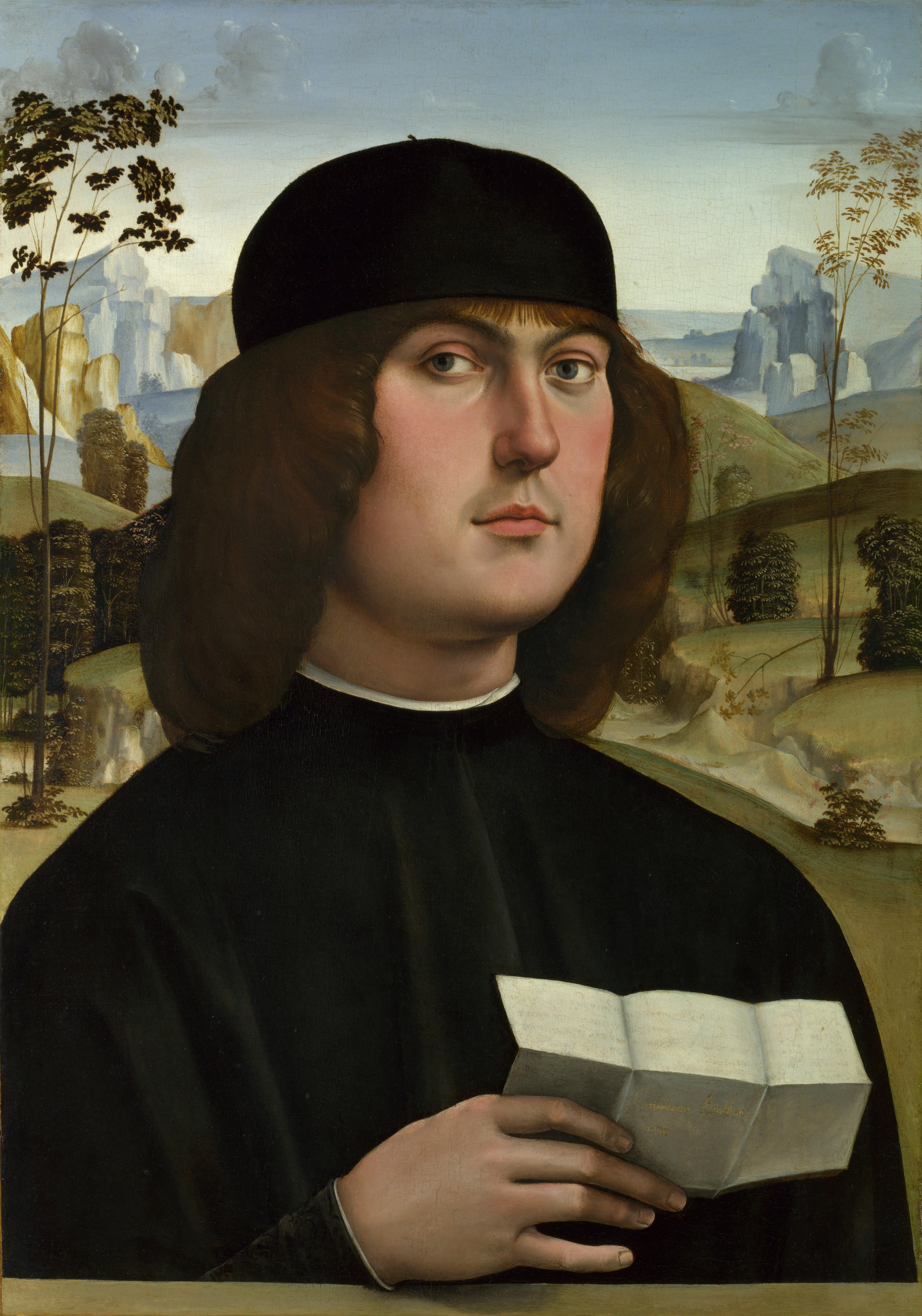
Bartolomeo Biachini
1485-1500, London

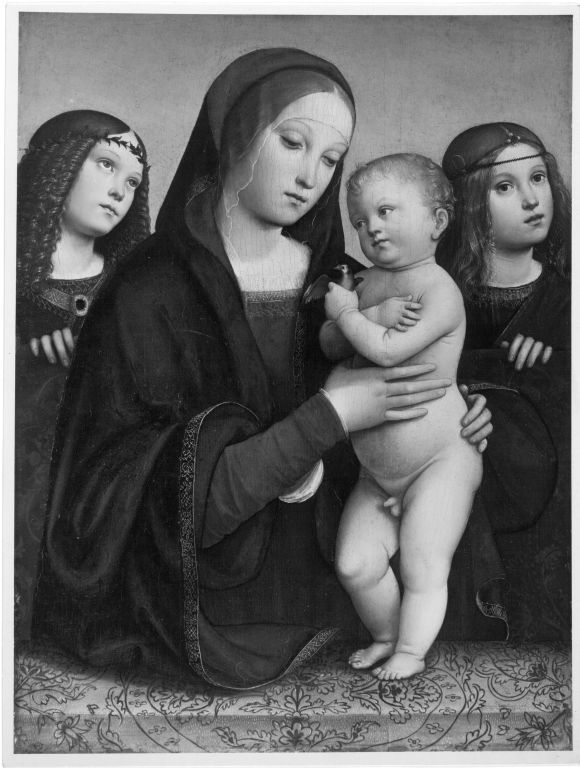
Madonna with Angels
c. 1495, Munich

=== Years 1500-10 ===
- Madonna and Child, c. 1500, 67 cm x 52 cm, oil on wood, Wallington Hall, National Trust, Northumberland
- Madonna and Child with Saints Francis and Jerome, 1500–10, 75 cm x 57 cm, tempera on wood, Metropolitan Museum of Art, New York
- The Annunciation with St. Albert the Carmelite, c. 1503–04, 182 cm x 132 cm, oil on canvas (formerly wood), Musée Condé, Chantilly
- Adoration of the Child, 1500–05, 175 cm x 132 cm, oil on wood, Alte Pinakothek, Munich
- Evangelista Scappi, 1500–05, 55 cm x 44 cm, oil on wood, Uffizi, Florence
- Bishop Altobello Averoldo, c. 1505, 54 cm x 41 cm, oil on wood, National Gallery of Art, Washington
- Crucifixion, c. 1505, 246 cm x 146 cm, oil on wood, San Giacomo Maggiore, Bologna
- The life of Saint Cecilia and her husband Valerian - scene 1 (The Marriage) & 10 (The Burial), 1504–1506, 360 cm x 290 cm, frescoes, Oratorio di Santa Cecilia, Bologna
- Venus and Cupid, 1505–10, 80 cm x 49 cm, oil on wood, Musée des Beaux-Arts de Mulhouse
- Baptism of Jesus, 1509, 209 cm x 169 cm, oil on wood, Gemäldegalerie Alte Meister, Dresden
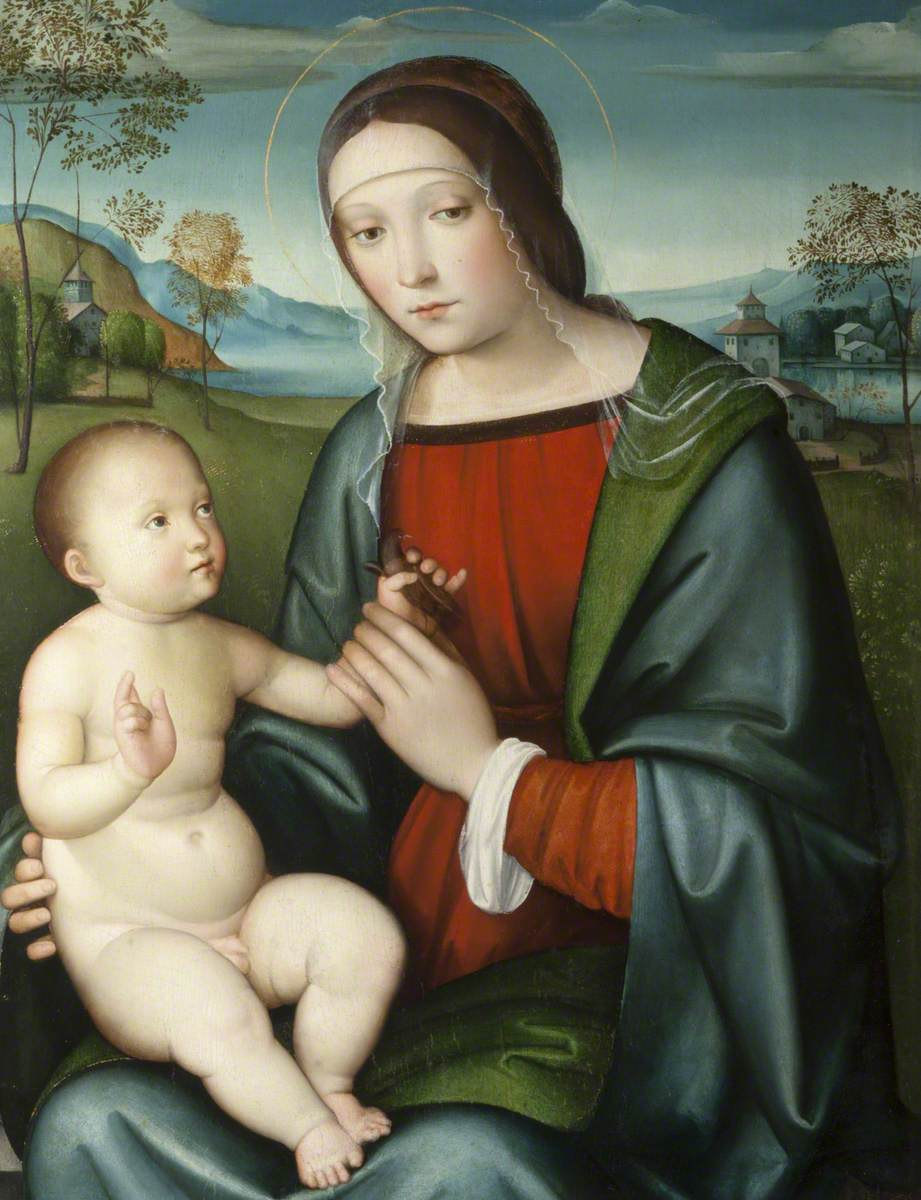
Madonna
c. 1500, Northumberland

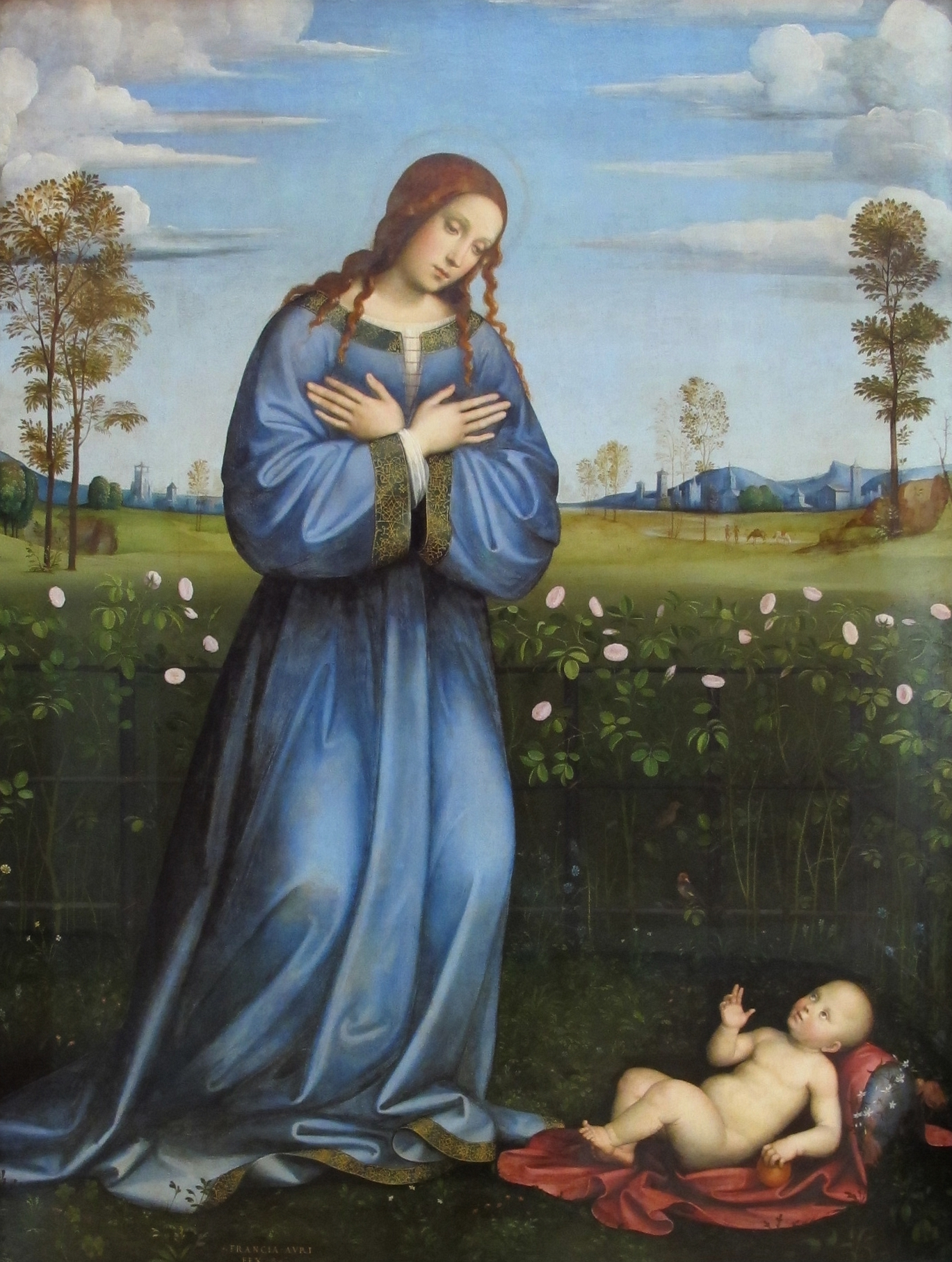
Adoration of Child
1500-05, Munich

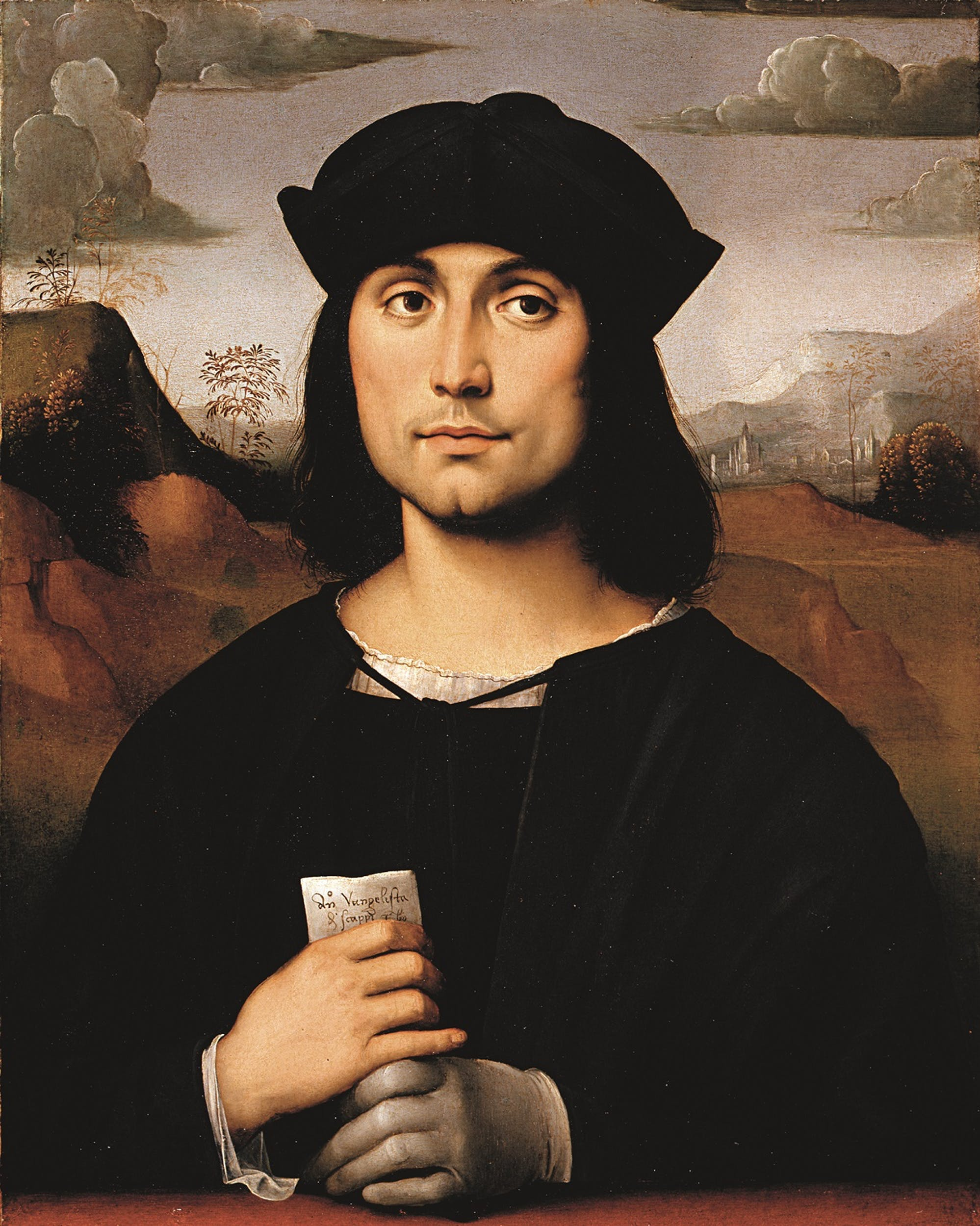
Evangelista Scappi
1500-05, Florence

Altobello Averoldo
c. 1505, Washington

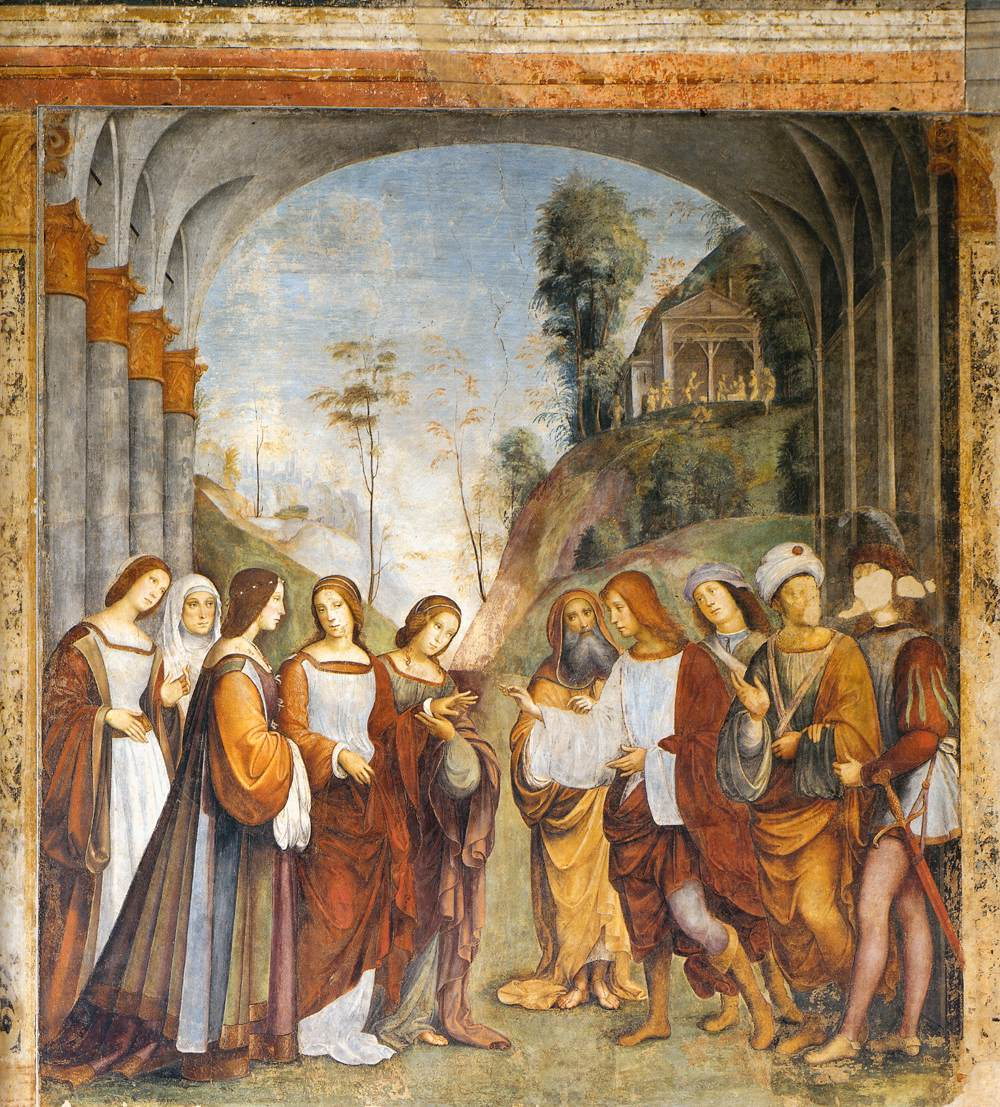
Cecilia / Le Mariage
1504-06, Bologna

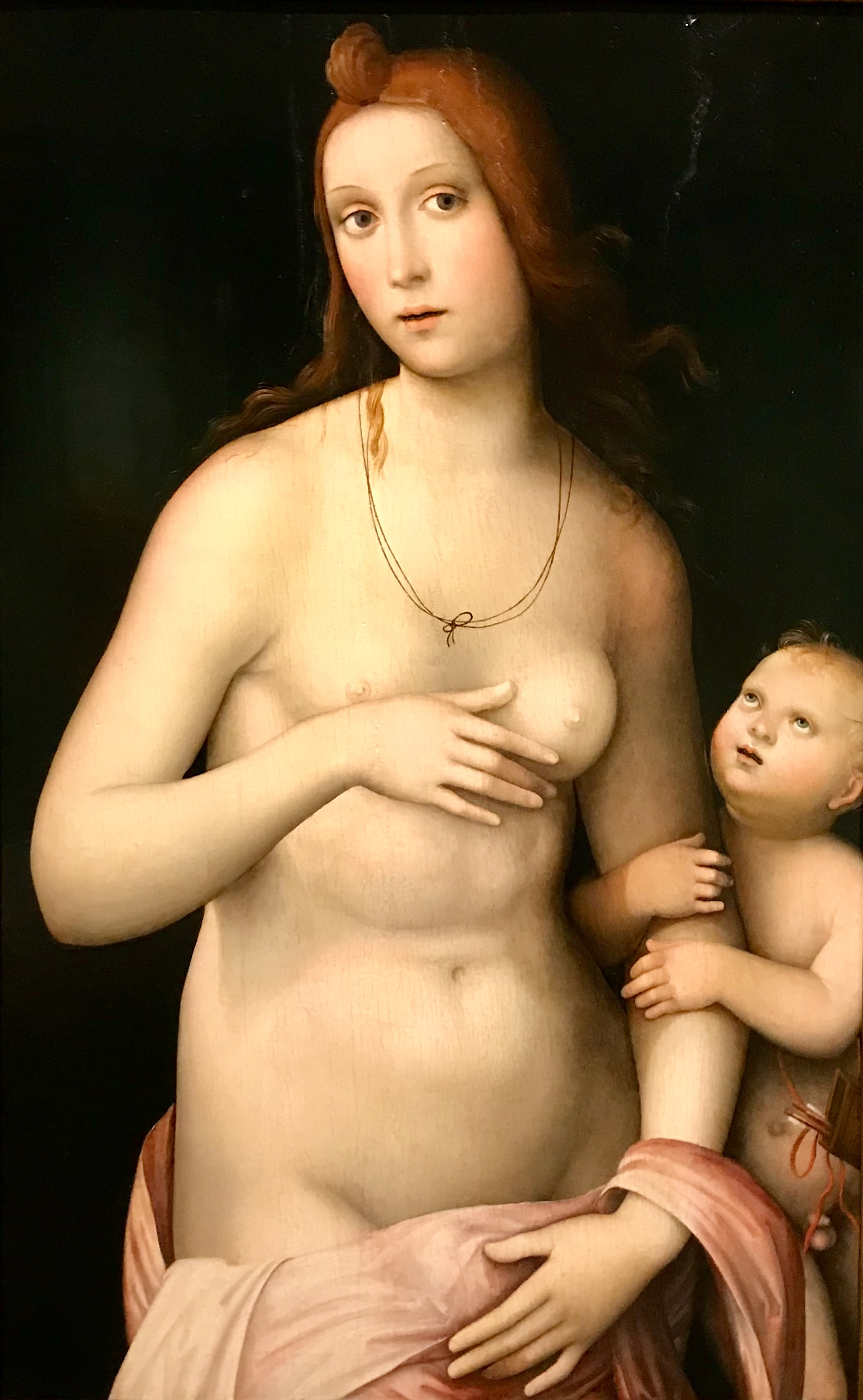
Venus and Cupid
1505-10, Mulhouse

=== After 1510 ===
- The Holy Family, c. 1510, 64 cm x 49 cm, oil on wood, Museum of Fine Arts, Budapest
- Federico Gonzaga (son of Isabella d'Este), 1510, 45 cm x 34 cm, oil on wood transferred to canvas and finally again on wood, Metropolitan Museum of Art, New York
- Portrait likely Isabella d'Este, 1511, 44 cm x 35 cm, oil on wood, Vienna
- Pala Buonvisi, 1510–12, 195 cm x 180 cm, oil on wood, National Gallery, London
- Presentation of Jesus in the temple, 1510–13, 201 cm x 145 cm, oil on wood, Pinacoteca Comunale di Cesena, Italy
- Virgin and the Child and the Infant St. John the Baptist, 1510–15, 65 cm x 51 cm, oil on wood, São Paulo Museum of Art
- Virgin and the Child and the Infant St. John the Baptist (Francesco Francia and sons), c. 1515, 115 cm x 94 cm, oil on wood, National Gallery of Victoria, Melbourne
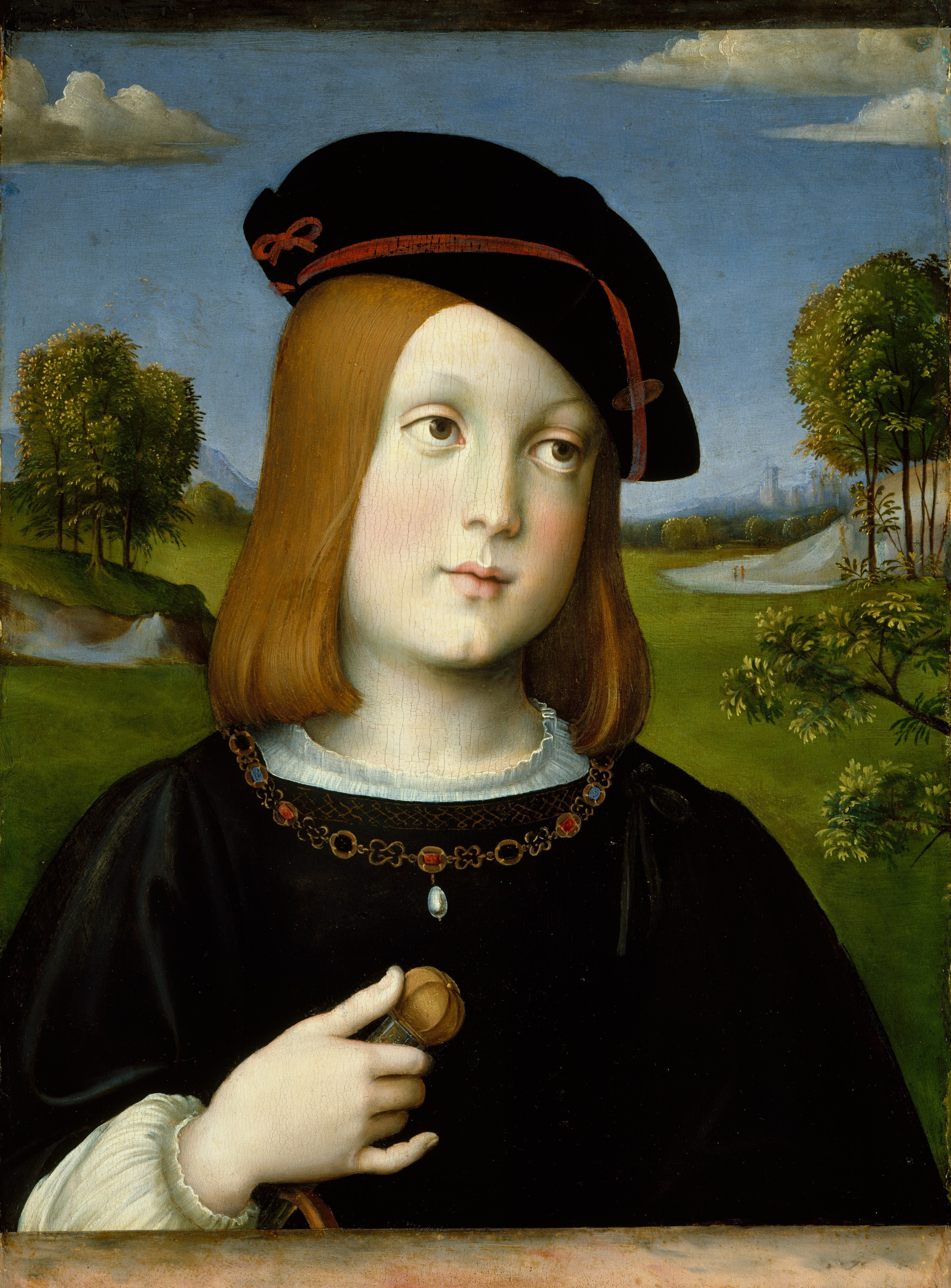
Federico Gonzaga
1510, New York

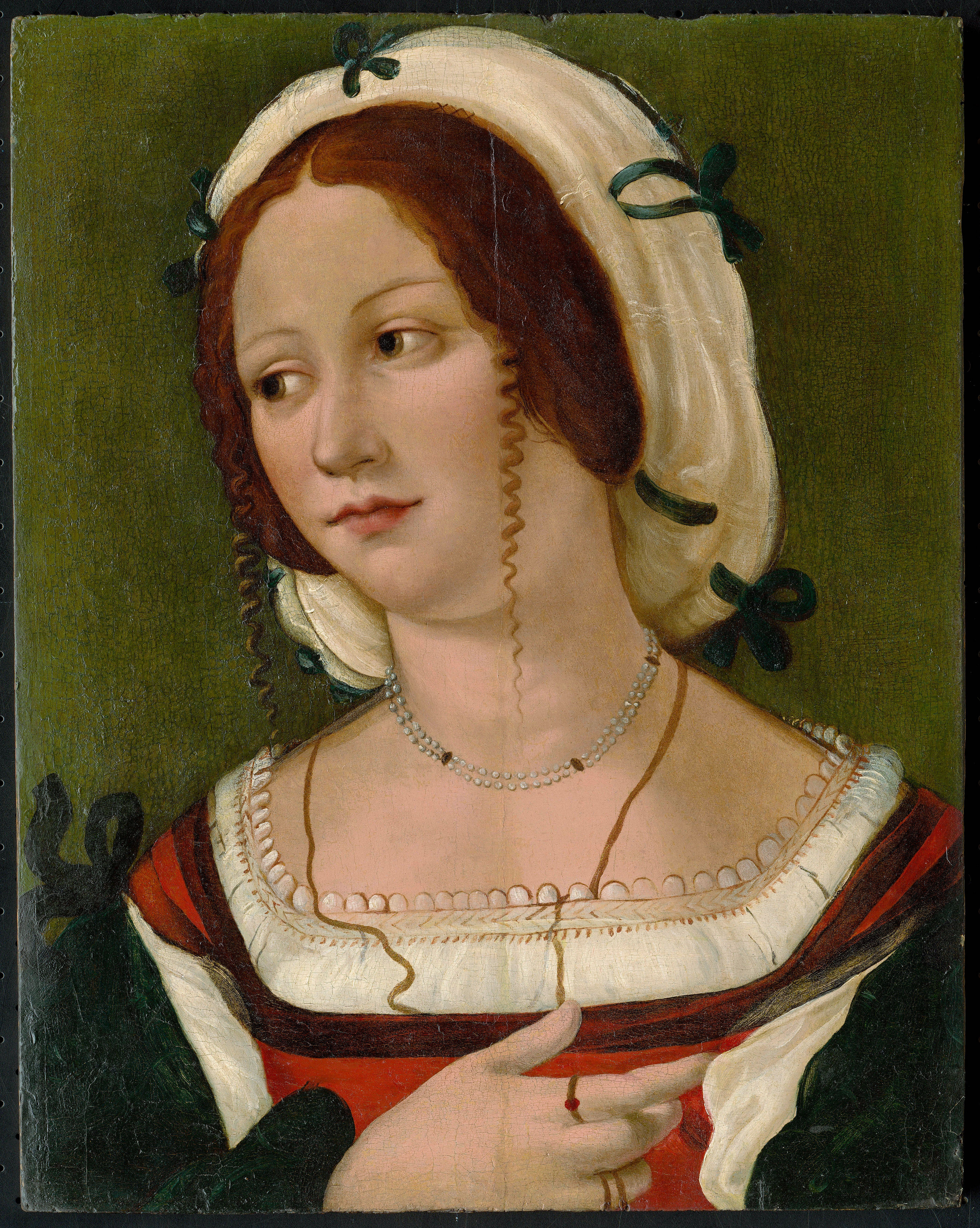
Likely Isabella d'Este
1511, Vienna

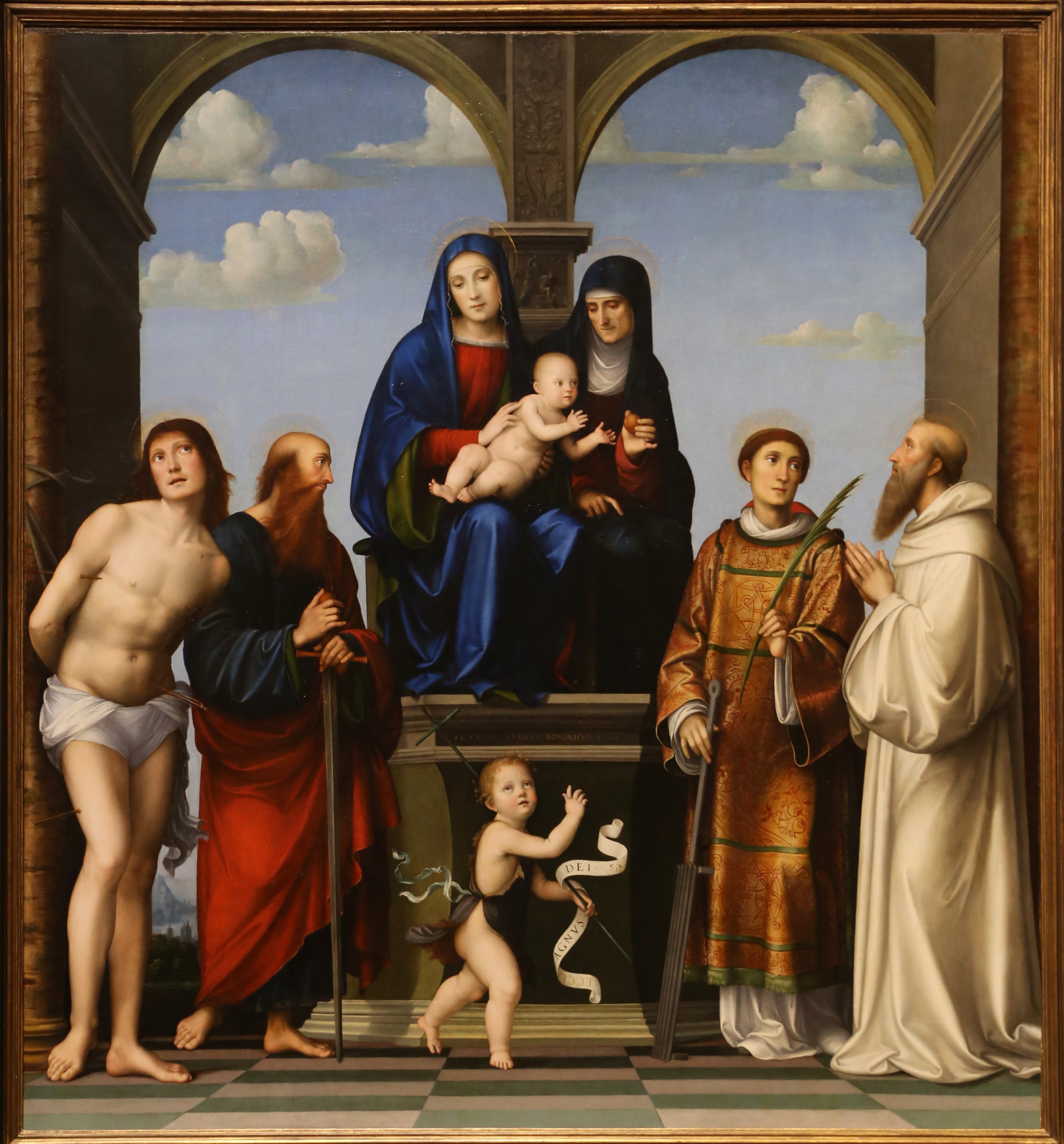
Pala Buonvisi
1510-12, London

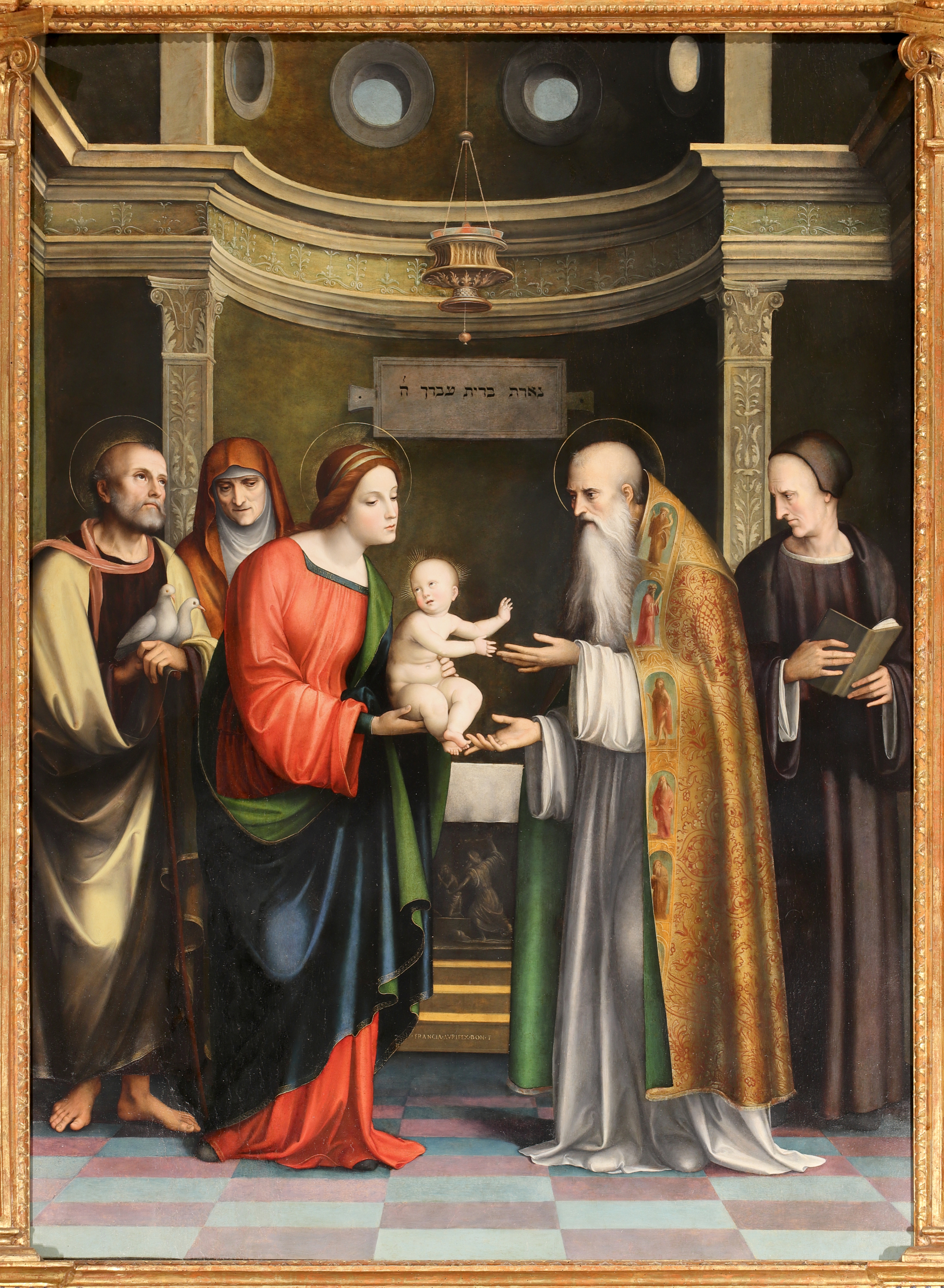
Presentation of Jesus
1510-13, Italy

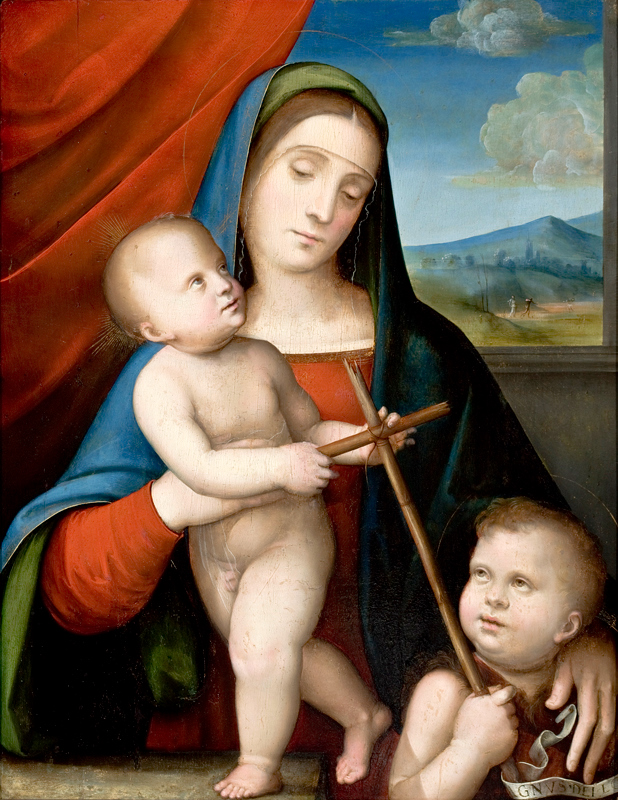
Madonna
1510-15, São Paulo

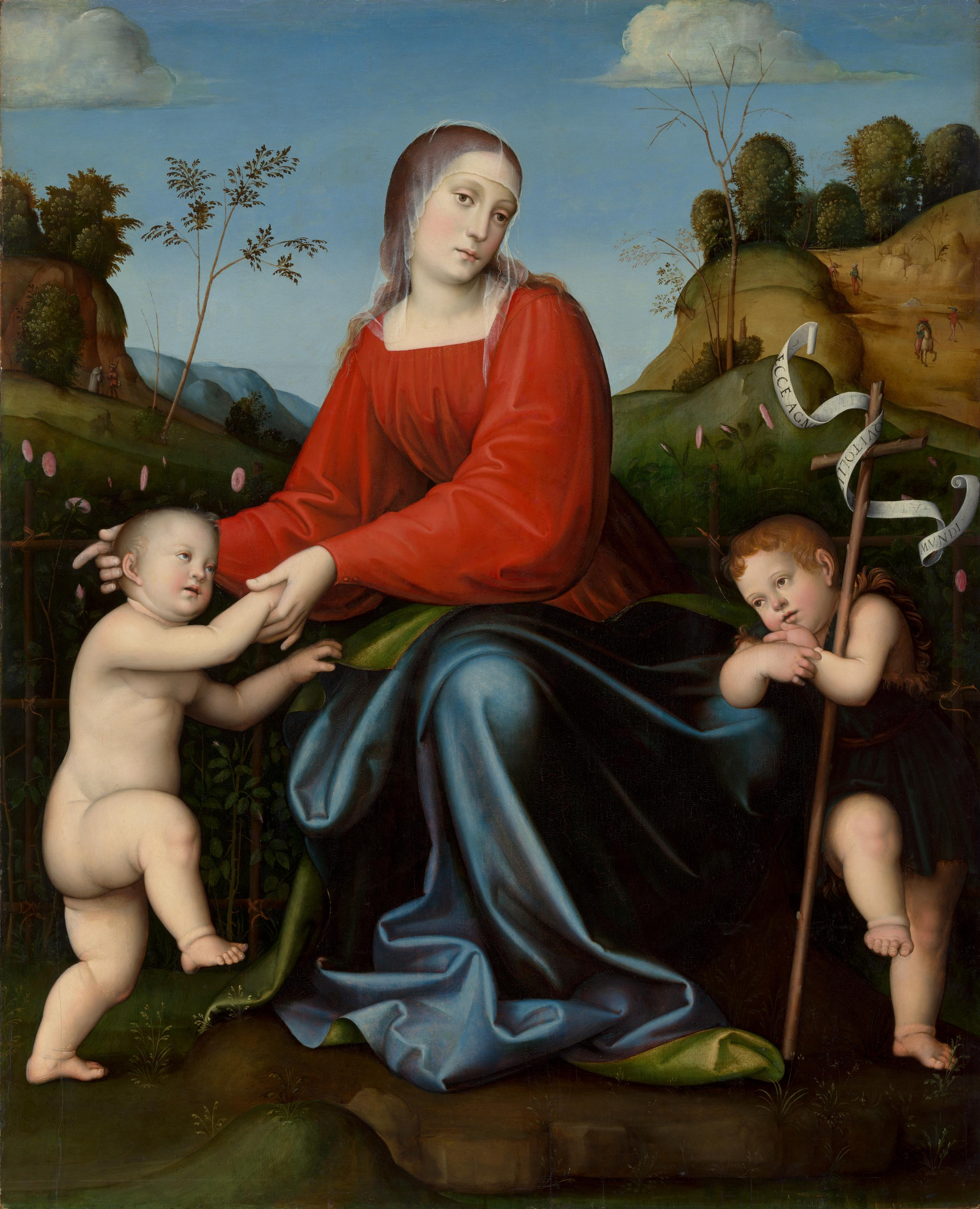
Madonna (Francia & sons)
c. 1515, Melbourne

== See also ==
- Adoration of the Shepherds (Raphael)
