= Bentivoglio (surname) =

Bentivoglio is an Italian surname. Notable people with the surname include:

- Annibale Bentivoglio (disambiguation), multiple people, including:
  - Annibale I Bentivoglio (1415–1445), absolute ruler of the Italian city of Bologna
  - Annibale II Bentivoglio (1467–1540), Italian condottiero who was shortly lord of Bologna
  - Annibale Bentivoglio (archbishop) (died 1663), Italian Roman Catholic archbishop
- Antongaleazzo Bentivoglio (c. 1385–1435), Italian condottiero who was executed by the papacy for treason
- Cornelio Bentivoglio (1668–1732), Italian nobleman and cardinal
- Ermes Bentivoglio (1475–1513), Italian condottiero
- Fabrizio Bentivoglio (born 1957), Italian cinema and theatre actor and screenwriter
- Giovanni Bentivoglio (disambiguation), multiple people, including:
  - Giovanni I Bentivoglio (died 1402), first ruler of Bologna from the Bentivoglio family
  - Giovanni II Bentivoglio (1443–1508), Italian nobleman
- Girolamo Bentivoglio (died 1601), Roman Catholic prelate
- Guido Bentivoglio (1579–1644), Italian cardinal, statesman and historian
- Ippolito II Bentivoglio (1611–1685), Italian nobleman
- Maria Francesca Bentivoglio (born 1977), Italian tennis player
- Mary Magdalen Bentivoglio (1834–1905), Italian nun of the Order of St. Clare
- Mirella Bentivoglio (1922–2017), Italian sculptor, poet, performance artist and curator
- Sante Bentivoglio (1426–1462), Italian nobleman who ruled as tyrant of Bologna
- Sean Bentivoglio (born 1985), Canadian ice hockey forward
- Simone Bentivoglio (born 1985), Italian football midfielder
- Vittoria Bentivoglio (16th century), Italian singer
