= Bentivoglio =

Bentivoglio may refer to:

- Bentivoglio (surname)
- House of Bentivoglio
- Bentivoglio, Emilia-Romagna, a comune (municipality) in Bologna, Italy

== See also ==
- Palazzo Bentivoglio (disambiguation)
