= Malvezzi family =

Italian noble family

- Patrician noble family
- Arms of the House of Malvezzi
- Country: Papal States
- Founded: 970; 1056 years ago
- Founder: Guido Malvezzi
- Estates: Palazzo Malvezzi-Medici; Palazzo Malvezzi-Campeggi; Rocca Malvezzi-Campeggi

The Malvezzi was one of the powerful noble families of Bologna, members of the Guelph party who contested the Ghibelline Bentivoglio for control of the commune of Bologna.

== History ==
=== Origins ===
The Malvezzi are one of the oldest and wealthiest families in Bologna. They are claimed to descend from Guido Malvezzi, a nobleman of Lombard or Frankish origin who lived near Sorbara in the 970s. The earliest members of the Malvezzi lineage appeared in Bologna around 1176, when they took part in the struggles between Geremei and Lambertazzi.

The Malvezzi were staunch members of the Guelph faction and actively participated in the town's political life. Together with the Bentivoglio, they were the only family to have a double representation inside the city council. The Malvezzi were bitter enemies of the Bentivoglio family. The two families were nearly related; both had identified themselves with the cause of Bolognese independence. But the Bentivoglio were first in the city, and the Malvezzi could not be content with the second place.

=== The Malvezzi conspiracy ===
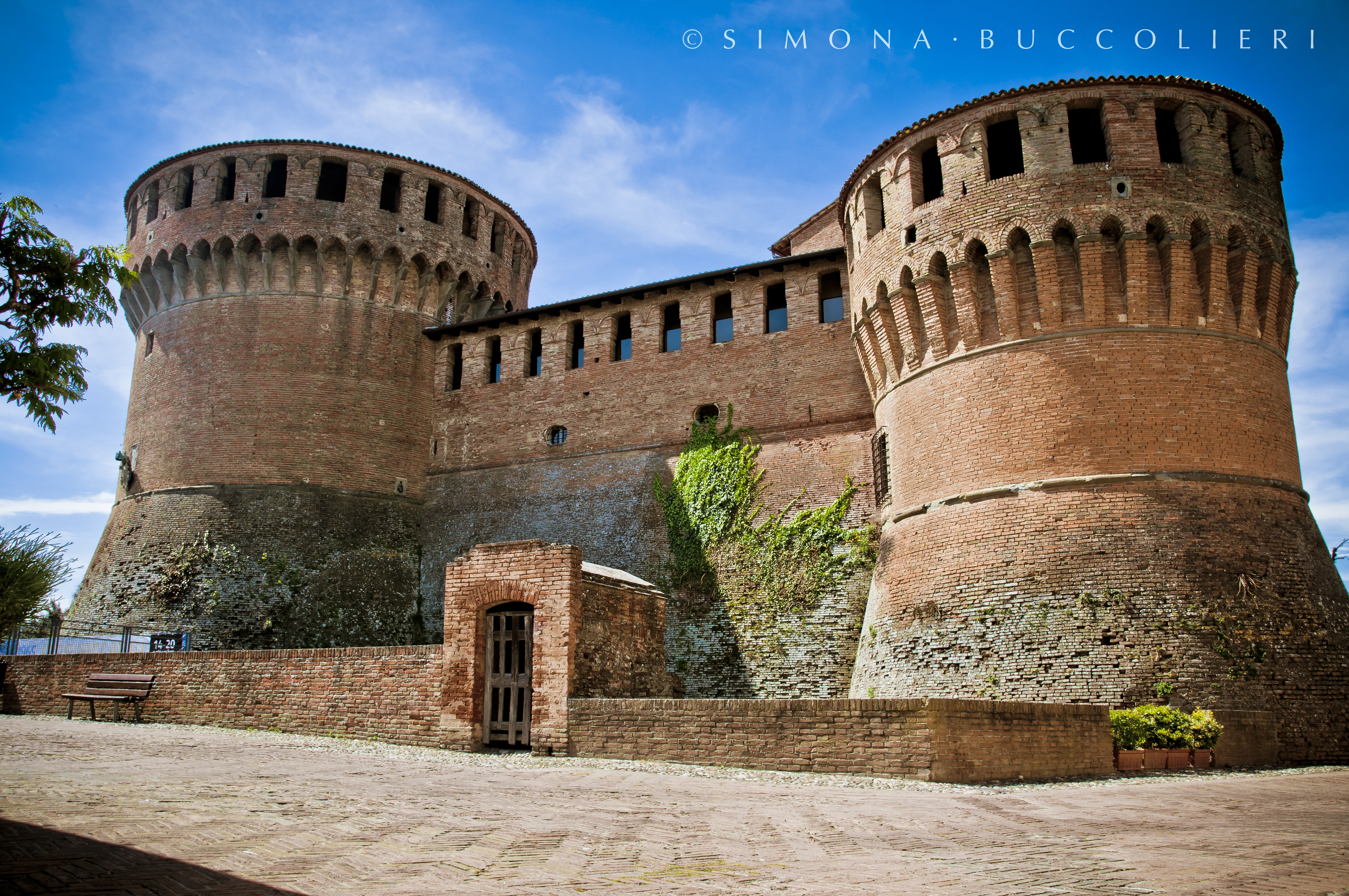
Rocca Malvezzi-Campeggi

In 1488 Bologna was torn by violence as a result of the abortive plot, headed by the Malvezzi family, to murder the entire Bentivoglio family which had become rulers of Bologna after the accession of Giovanni II. The plot was discovered, and two of the main conspirators, Giovanni Malvezzi and Giacomo Bargellini, were condemned to death. In the disturbances that followed their execution there was much bloodshed in the city. Most of the Malvezzi were hanged, imprisoned, or exiled, and their goods confiscated. Those who remained, unsafe and insecure in Bentivoglio dominated Bologna, gradually left the city on their own initiative over the next few years.

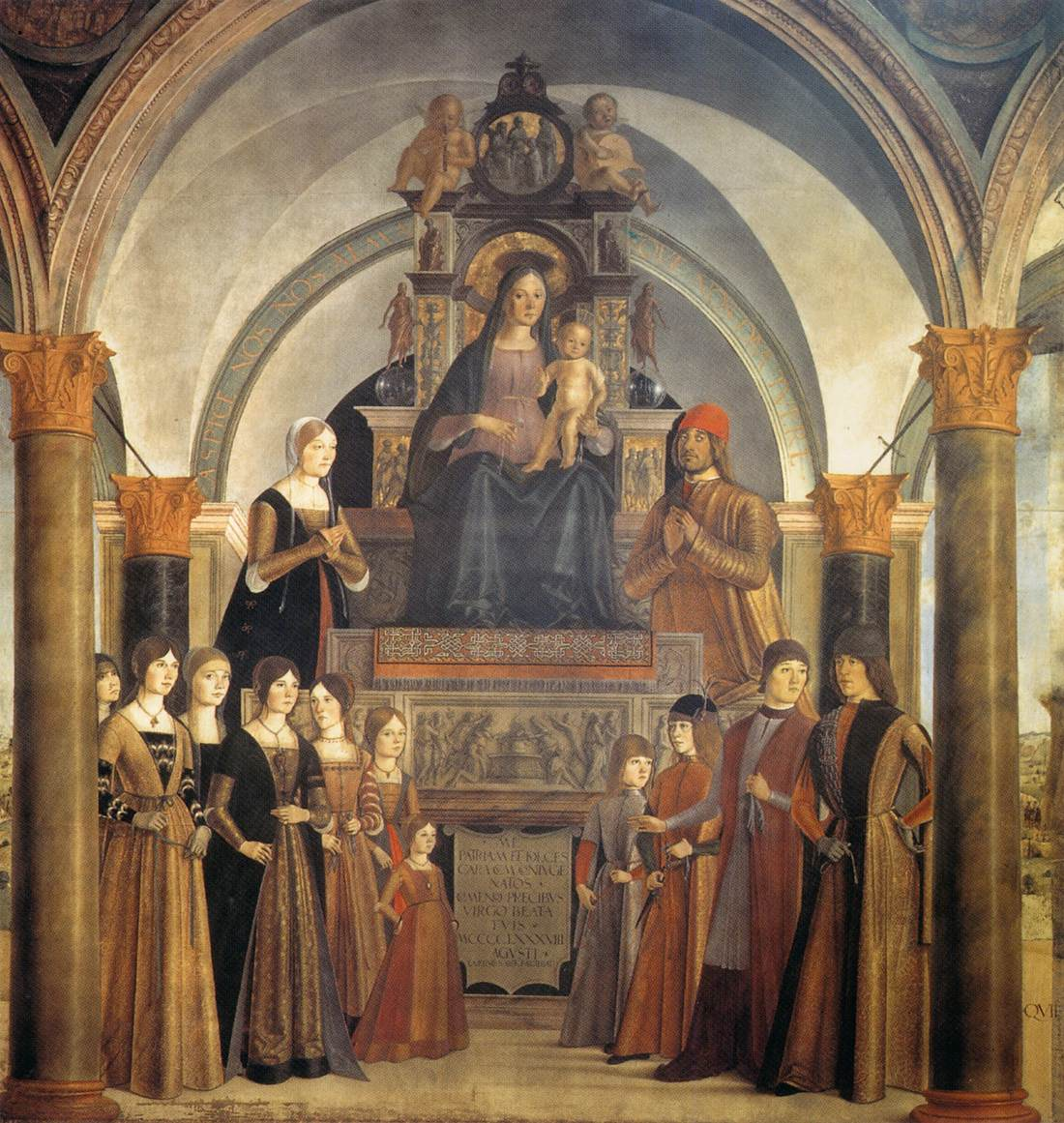
Lorenzo Costa's Bentivoglio Altarpiece in the church of San Giacomo Maggiore, Bologna

On December 8 a solemn service of thanksgiving was held at Santa Maria dei Servi to celebrate the family's escape from assassination. Lorenzo Costa's Bentivoglio Altarpiece, housed in the Bentivoglio Chapel in the church of San Giacomo Maggiore, was commissioned by Giovanni Bentivoglio as a votive offering of thanks for the family's escape from the attempted plot and the anniversary of the conspiracy's discovery was celebrated solemnly every year.

=== Fall of Giovanni Bentivoglio and return to Bologna ===
With the descent of Charles VIII into Italy at the end of the 15th century, the system of princely alliances so carefully constructed by Giovanni Bentivoglio was destroyed. The Medici were banished from Florence, and the Sforza from Milan. Giovanni alienated the pope, and Julius II set out to bring Bologna back into the fold (1506). Giovanni and his large family fled before the forces of the pope (November 2, 1506) and never returned to Bologna. The downfall of Giovanni Bentivoglio allowed the Malvezzi to return to Bologna.

The Malvezzi were regularly listed among the ruling families in Bologna since the years of Julius II, and later, allied by marriage to the Campeggi, they attained the status of marquises. When the Campeggi family died out, for lack of male heirs, in 1727, their inheritance, honors and privileges went to the marquises of the Malvezzi family, which took the name Malvezzi-Campeggi.

== Prominent members ==
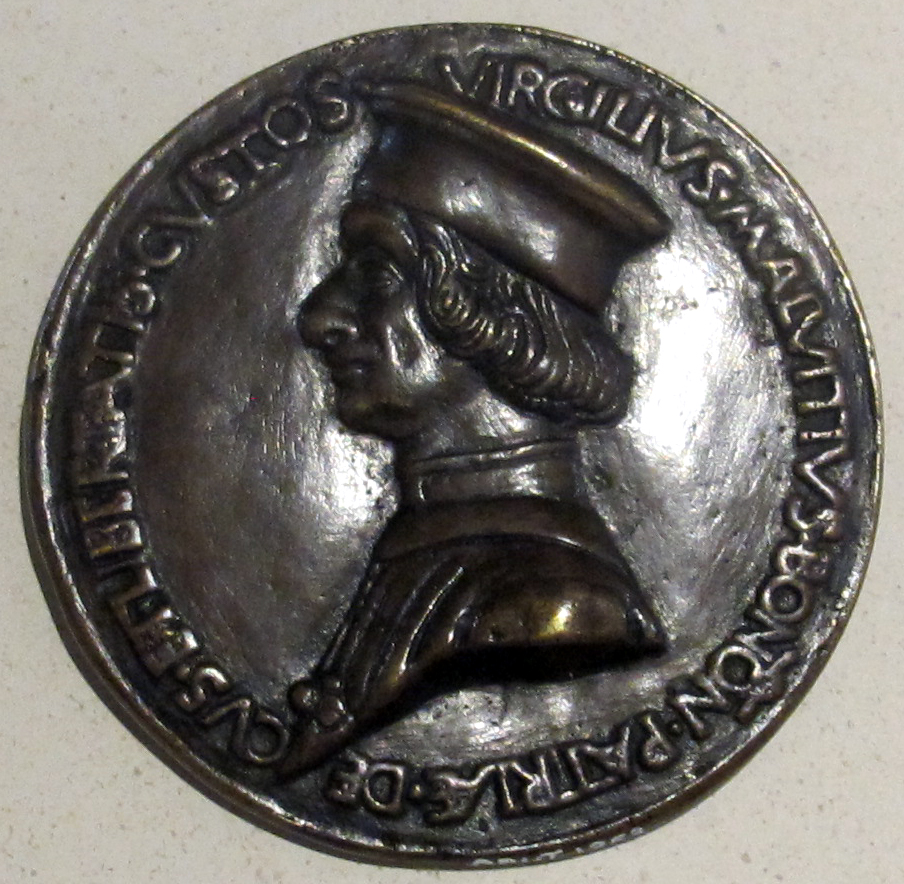
Medal of Virgilio Malvezzi by Sperandio Savelli

The family included numerous men of arms, prominent ecclesiastics and politicians. Among them the following stand out:

- Achille Malvezzi: a member of the order of the Knights Hospitaller, he became the commander of the militia of Bologna in the 1430s.
- Ludovico Malvezzi (1418–1467): condottiero. He was one of the commanders of the Venetian Army at the Battle of Caravaggio. In his later years, he served the Papal States, commanding the Papal forces at the Battle of Nidastore (1461)
- Annibale Malvezzi: Condottiero for the Venetian army, circa 1480.
- Virgilio Malvezzi: a prominent politician, writer and diplomat, he became court historian to Philip IV of Spain.
- Teresa Carniani Malvezzi de' Medici: Italian poet, writer, and translator.
- Giovanni Luigi Malvezzi de' Medici: politician, patriot, and scholar.

== Bibliography ==
- Dolfi, Pompeo Scipione (1670). Cronologia delle famiglie nobili di Bologna. Bologna: presso Gio. Battista Ferroni. pp. 490–509.
- Toselli, Filippo Maria (1770). Memorie d'alcuni uomini illustri della famiglia Malvezzi. Bologna: Lelio dalla Volpe.
- Crollalanza, Giovan Battista di (1886). Dizionario storico-blasonico delle famiglie nobili e notabili italiane estinte e fiorenti. Pisa: Direzione del Giornale Araldico.
- Sorbelli, Albano (1934). "MALVEZZI". Enciclopedia Italiana. Rome: Istituto dell'Enciclopedia Italiana.
