= Annibale Bentivoglio =

Annibale Bentivoglio may refer to:

- Annibale I Bentivoglio (1415–1445), absolute ruler of the Italian city of Bologna
- Annibale II Bentivoglio (1467–1540), Italian condottiero who was shortly lord of Bologna
- Annibale Bentivoglio (archbishop) (died 1663), Italian Roman Catholic archbishop

== See also ==
- Bentivoglio family
