= Bartolomeo della Rocca =

Italian scholar

Bartolomeo della Rocca, also known as Cocles (March 19, 1467 – September 9, 1504) was a scholar of chiromancy, physiognomy, astrology, and geomancy who lived in Bologna, Italy during the rule of the House of Bentivoglio from 1323 to 1506.

In the months which preceded April, 1498, he participated (with others) in the preparation of a list of predictions relating to the life expectancies of different personalities for Giovanni Bentivoglio, dictator of Bologna and father of his boss Alessandro Bentivoglio. The work of Bartolomeo della Rocca was promoted by the Italian philosopher Alessandro Achillini. His main work, Chiromantie ac physionomie anastasis was published in 1504 then the Compendio of Fisiognomica ("Compendium of Physiognomics"), was published after his death, in 1553 in Strasbourg. Bartolomeo della Rocca was assassinated by the Italian condottiero Ermes Bentivoglio because of his prediction that Ermes would die in battle.
