= Ginevra Sforza =

Italian noblewoman

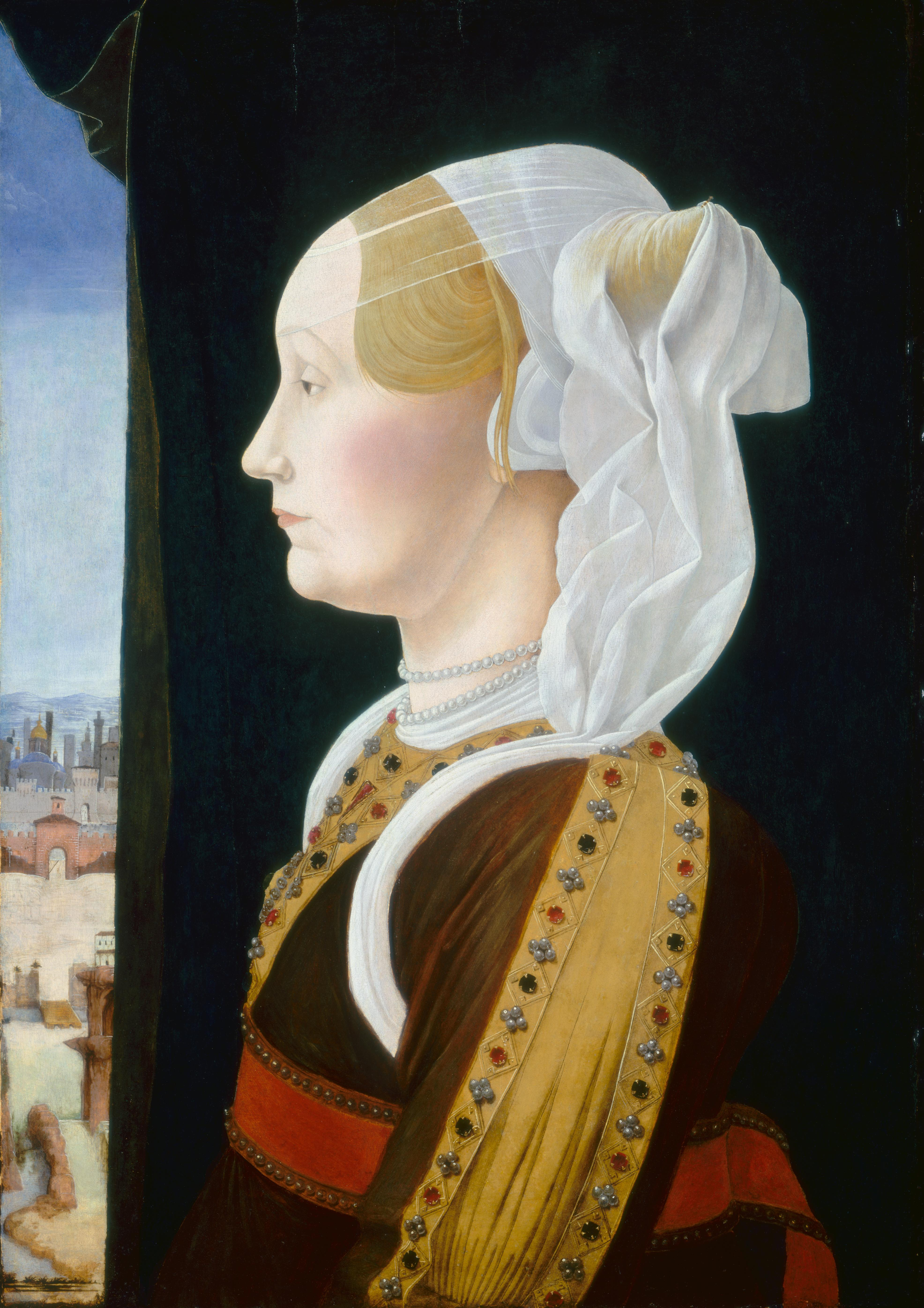
- Born: c. 1441 unknown, probably near Pesaro
- Died: 17 May 1507 (aged 66–67); Busseto, Parma
- Other name: Genevra Sforza de' Bentivoglio
- Known for: Illegitimate daughter of Alessandro Sforza, lord of Pesaro; "fecundissima" wife of Giovanni II Bentivoglio; and "first lady" of Renaissance-era Bologna for over 50 years
- Spouses: Sante Bentivoglio (m. 1454; died 1463) Giovanni II Bentivoglio (m. 1464–1507)

Ginevra Sforza (c. 1441 – 17 May 1507) was an Italian aristocrat. She was the wife of Sante Bentivoglio and then of Giovanni II Bentivoglio, both de facto signori (or unofficial leaders, or 'lords') of Bologna. She had 18 children and served the Bentivoglio family by fulfilling the gendered role demanded of her by society.

For the past 500 years in Bolognese historiography, Ginevra had been known as a terrible woman who destroyed her family and the city of Bologna. Subsequent academic research conducted about her life based on 15th-century materials that had been dispersed among dozens of Italian archives and libraries presented a re-evaluation of Ginevra's life and reputation.

== Birth and first marriage ==
In 1441 Ginevra Sforza was likely born in or near Pesaro in the Marche region of Italy to an unknown woman. She was recognized as an illegitimate daughter of Alessandro Sforza, the signore of Pesaro and the brother of Francesco Sforza, the Duke of Milan. Her half-sister was Battista Sforza, wife of Federigo of Montefeltro of Urbino. Ginevra also had several other siblings, both legitimate and illegitimate, and was raised with them in Pesaro at her father's home and under his guidance.

Alessandro had a falling out with his brother Francesco, and he made peace with Francesco by offering Ginevra to use in a marriage alliance of his choice. At around age 12, Ginevra was married by proxy to Sante Bentivoglio and joined him in Bologna, where she led her adult life as the 'first lady' of the Bentivoglio family. Sante and Ginevra were wed on 19 May 1454 and celebrated their marriage with a major celebrations (one chronicler claimed that the festivities were 'fir for a king'); the wedding party was supposed to begin by celebrating mass at the Basilica of San Petronio but was moved to the Church of San Giacomo after Cardinal Giovanni Bessarion refused to allow them to celebrate in Piazza Maggiore due to their overstepping of sumptuary legislation. Ginevra was wed to Sante with no dowry; Francesco Sforza did not have to pay one due to the difference in status between the couple since Ginevra was considered a prize for Sante in Bologna and did not have to pay a dowry because fathers (or uncles) of illegitimate girls were not obliged to pay them according in 15th c. law.

Ginevra and Sante had two children:

- Constanza Bentivoglio (1458–1491) who married Antonmaria Pico della Mirandola;
- Ercole Bentivoglio (1459–1507), a condottiere, who married Barbara Torelli;

Sante also had an earlier illegitimate son named Antonio (1440-1449) with an unknown woman. Antonio was presumably born in or near Poppi in Ariezzo.

== Second marriage ==
In 1463, Ginevra became a widow after Sante died of tuberculosis, and a year later was forced by her uncle, Francesco Sforza, to marry a second Bentivoglio man in Bologna: Sante's cousin, Giovanni II Bentivoglio. Stories alleged an intimate relationship between Genevra and Giovanni II occurred while Sante was still alive, though little contemporary evidence exists to support the claims.

Genevra had sixteen children with her second husband, of whom five died in infancy. They were:

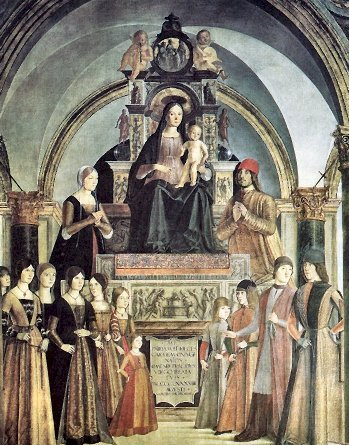
Bentivoglio family by Lorenzo Costa

- Annibale III, later called Annibale II Bentivoglio (1469–1540) who married Lucrezia, an illegitimate daughter of Ercole I d'Este; Annibale II briefly became a de facto signore (lord) of Bologna from 1511 to 1512;
- Ermes Bentivoglio (1475–1513) who married Giacoma Orsini of Rome;
- Alessandro Bentivoglio (1474–1532) who married Ippolita Sforza of Milan;
- Camilla (1473-1541), a nun at Corpus Domini in Bologna;
- Isotta (1479--?), a nun at Corpus Domini in Bologna;
- Francesca (1468-1504) who married to Galeotto Manfredi of Faenza then Guido Torelli;
- Antongaleazzo Bentivoglio (1472-1525), protonotaio apostolico;
- Eleonora (1470-1540) who married Ghiberto Pio of Carpi;
- Laura (1477-1523) who married Giovanni Gonzaga of Mantua;
- Violante (1475--?) who married Pandolfo IV Malatesta of Rimini;
- Bianca (1467--?) who married Niccolò Rangoni of Spilamberto;
- Those who died young were: Annibale II (b. 1465); Donnina (b. 1471); Isotta (b. 1478); Cornelio (b. 1481); and Ludovico (b. 1482).

Giovanni II also fathered many other illegitimate children; he fathered these additional children with at least five domestic servants who lived under his roof.

Giovanni II and Ginevra also served as godparents on a massive scale, serving over 350 local children from over 200 local families. Giovanni II and Genevra had so many children as a result of the near annihilation of the Bentivoglio family in the early 15th century. Because Giovanni II had also been humiliated on a peninsular scale when he was forced into Milanese submission by being forcibly married to Ginevra, an older woman previously married to his lower-ranked cousin and Giovanni's aunt by marriage, he wanted to show that he was a powerful man who could create a huge family and dominate Bologna.

Ginevra was involved in many activities appropriate for a woman of her status and time. A dance composed, choreographed, and named 'Zinevera' after Ginevra was created by Renaissance Italy's most famous dance master, Guglielmo Ebreo (later Giovanni Ambrosio). Ginevra was the central figure in Giovanni Sabadino degli Arienti's collection of women's lives: Gynevera de le clare donne; and later of Giacomo Filippo Foresti's collection of women's lives. Her famous 1475 portrait painted by Ercole de' Roberti and her smaller ca. 1454 lead portrait medal created by Antonio Marescotti are both held at the National Gallery of Art in Washington, D.C. Ginevra befriended Gentile Budrioli (wife of the notary Alessandro Cimieri) who was accused of witchcraft and burned at the stake in 1498. She was also an attentive host who organized many wedding celebrations and other festivities over the course of her life.

From Sante's rule onward many popes somewhat acknowledged the lordship of the Bentivoglio--although neither Sante nor Giovanni II ever ruled as a de jure signori but only as de facto rulers, as heads of the Sedici. Angela De Benedictis described Bologna was only a "republic by contract."

The Bentivoglio family faced a conspiracy by the Malvezzi family in 1488 and in 1501 another one organized by the rival Marescotti. Although legends claim that Ginevra gave advice to retaliate brutally, there is no evidence in any 15th century documentation that she ever said or convinced anyone to retaliate. Many Malvezzi and Marescotti family members were however killed in revenge.

== Exile and death ==
Bolognese citizens complained about the government in Bologna and petitioned Pope Julius II, who personally led his army to Bologna to take over a city that he considered to be a lost rebel city. Giovanni II, the Bentivoglio men, and many partisans fled Bologna in the dark on the night of 1 November 1506 to avoid being killed by papal troops; they headed through Mantuan territory and then to Milan. Ginevra and the Bentivoglio women also voluntarily exiled themselves from Bologna a few days later, heading to Mantua to stay with Isabella d'Este. Eventually Ginevra was forced out of Mantua by Pope Julius II and headed toward Milan. Due to grave illness, she was first forced to take refuge along the way with the Marchese Galeazzo Pallavicini in Busseto (Parma). The Bentivoglio properties in Bologna were looted and Palazzo Bentivoglio was razed in early May 1507.

Ginevra died on 17 May 1507, and later legends claimed that her body was thrown into the nettles in Busseto (Parma). Instead, she was likely buried in the Pallavicino family chapel dedicated to Santa Maria delle Grazie within the Chiesa of Santa Maria degli Angeli in Busseto. Giovanni II died the following year in Milan.

Many negative stories were invented after Ginevra's death, blaming her for how the Bentivoglio lost power in Bologna. However, contemporary accounts did not indicate she was held responsible for the downfall of the Bentivoglio. The majority of accounts against Ginevra were invented by Bentivoglio enemies who stayed in Bologna after the Bentivoglio exile of 1506.

== Notes and references ==
Citations

Sources

- "Ginevra e Gentile". Accademia Culturale "Castelli in Aria". Archived from the original on 2012-05-30.
- "La storia dei Bentivoglio". Istituto Comprensivo di Ozzano dell'Emilia - Bologna. Archived from the original on 2011-07-22.
- Samoggia, Sandro (2013). "Giovanni II, il Principe di Bologna". Mia Bologna.
