= Giovanni Luigi Malvezzi de' Medici =

Italian politician

Count Giovanni Luigi Malvezzi de' Medici
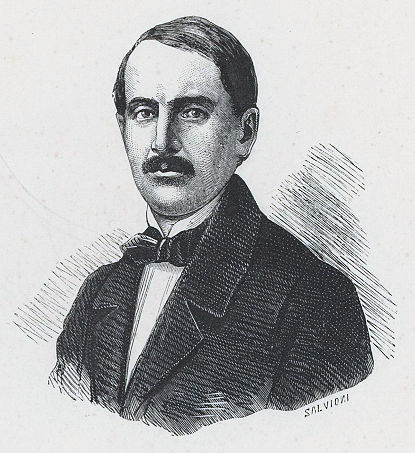
- Giovanni Luigi Malvezzi de' Medici

Senator of the Kingdom of Italy
- In office 18 March 1860 – 3 October 1892
- Monarch: Victor Emmanuel II

Personal details
- Born: 10 September 1819 Bologna, Papal States
- Died: 3 October 1892 (aged 73) Ozzano dell'Emilia, Italy
- Party: Historical Right
- Spouse(s): Barbara Pio di Savoia Scapinelli (m. 1841; died 1849) Augusta Tanari (m. 1849)
- Parent(s): Francesco Malvezzi de' Medici and Teresa Carniani
- Occupation: Politician, writer
- Noble family: Malvezzi family

Giovanni Luigi Malvezzi de' Medici (Bologna, September 10, 1819 – Ozzano dell'Emilia, October 3, 1892) was an Italian politician, patriot, and scholar.

== Biography ==
Malvezzi was born to a family from Bologna, son of Count Francesco and Countess Teresa Carniani Malvezzi. He married Barbara Pio di Savoia Scapinelli, born in Modena on October 8, 1823; and was widowed February 28, 1848. He remarried on September 20, 1849, to Augusta Tanari (April 2, 1831 – March 27, 1886). Malvezzi and Tanari had 5 children together, including Senator Nerio. Malvezzi died at his villa in Ozzano dell'Emilia October 3, 1892.

== Political life ==
During his youth he was persecuted by the Papal authorities for his liberal political ideas. He participated and helped finance the uprising of 1848 and 1849 where he was appointed Chief of State of the Civic Guard of Bologna. In 1859 he played a prominent part in the military movements that drove the Austrians from Bologna, and was among the citizens that dealt with the surrender of the Austrian troops (April 18, 1859). He included in the surrender agreements the condition that the officers had to leave their swords.

On June 12, after the departure of the Papal legate, he was named to the council of the provisional government council. This council represented the interests of the moderates, and of the liberals allied to Marco Minghetti. The council supported the referendum for to unite Bologna with Savoia. After the overwhelming support for the union in the referendum, the council worked under the leadership of Massimo d’Azeglio. Giovanni Malvezzi was then made president of the municipal commission of Bologna, as well as councilor of state for the government of Romagna. On September 3, 1859, he was elected the Major General Commander of the National Guard of Bologna.

On March 18, 1860, the provinces of Bologna we annexed to the Kingdom of Sardinia, and on that date Vittorio Emanuele II appointed Malvezzi to the post as Senator, but he rarely attended meetings of the senate. Again in 1872 he became the Mayor of Bologna, and later stayed as provincial councilor. During this time he kept in close contact with Minghetti, who represented the city. He was also the chairman of many charitable and cultural institutions in Bologna: L'Istituto di Belle Arti and Congregazione di Beneficenza and the Ricovero di Mendicità. After his death he was commemorated in the Senate by the Senate president Luigi Carlo Farini, and was given a marble bust in the Palazzo Comunale of Bologna.

== Artistic patronage ==
In 1852 he commissioned decoration of the main rooms of his palazzo in Bologna, today the seat of the province. In particular, he had several ceiling frescoes by Francesco Cocchi and Andrea Pesci and the perspective background of the Council Chamber by Onorato Zanotti. In the pink room, Girolamo Dal Pane frescoed the great poets of antiquity and also a scene from the Decameron. While the red room is decorated with a Danza delle Ore, as well as luxurious Murano glass chandeliers.

== Bibliography ==
- Giuliano Malvezzi Campeggi, ed. (1996). Malvezzi. Storia, genealogia e iconografia. Roma: Tilligraf.
- Fiorentino, Carlo M. (2007). "MALVEZZI DE' MEDICI, Giovanni". Dizionario Biografico degli Italiani (in Italian). Vol. 68: Malatacca–Mangelli. Rome: Institute of the Italian Encyclopaedia. ISBN 978-88-12-00032-6.
