= Seraphina Sforza =

Italian beatified nun (1434–1478)

Blessed Seraphina Sforza
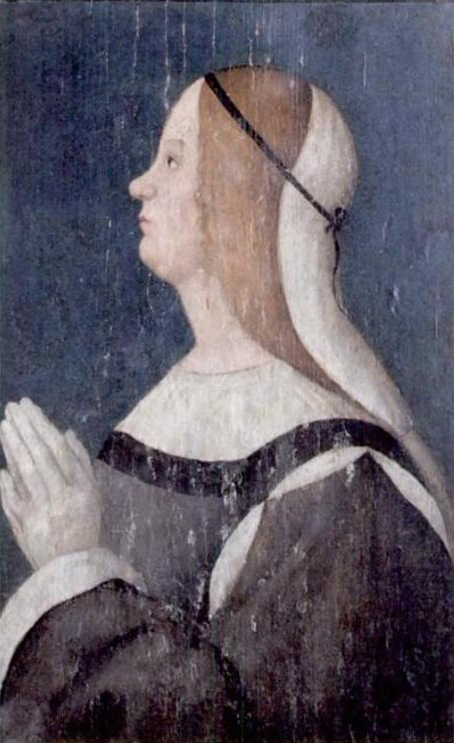
- Anonymous devotional portrait, 15th century
- Born: Sveva da Montefeltro; 1434; Urbino, County of Urbino
- Residence: Pesaro
- Died: 8 September 1478 (aged 43–44)
- Venerated in: Catholicism
- Beatified: 17 July 1754 by Pope Benedict XIV
- Feast: 9 September

Sveva da Montefeltro (1434 – 8 September 1478) was an Italian beatified nun and noblewoman of the House of Montefeltro. She is venerated by the Catholic Church for her life of devotion despite the hardships she encountered.

After an arranged marriage at the age of fourteen to Alessandro Sforza, lord of Pesaro, Sveva became known as Sveva Sforza. Some years later, Alessandro, himself carrying on a public affair with another woman, accused Sveva of adultery and plotting to kill him. He forced her to enter a convent of the Poor Clare order; there she took the name Seraphina (or Serafina), and later became abbess. She was beatified by Pope Benedict XIV in 1754, and has been venerated since, especially by Franciscans.

== Life ==
Sveva da Montefeltro was born in the city-state of Urbino, located in present-day Italy, in the first half of 1434. She was the daughter of Caterina Colonna, a niece of Pope Martin V, and Guido Antonio of Montefeltro, Count of Urbino. Her mother died in 1438, followed by her father in 1443.

Sveva's older brother, Oddantonio da Montefeltro, succeeded his father as Count and cared for Seraphina until his assassination in 1444. The next Count was Sveva's half-brother, Federico da Montefeltro, who in turn became her guardian. In March 1446, the 12-year-old Sveva was implicated in Sigismondo Pandolfo Malatesta's plot to murder Federico. The other conspirators were executed, and Sveva was sent to Rome to stay with her maternal uncle, Cardinal Prospero Colonna.

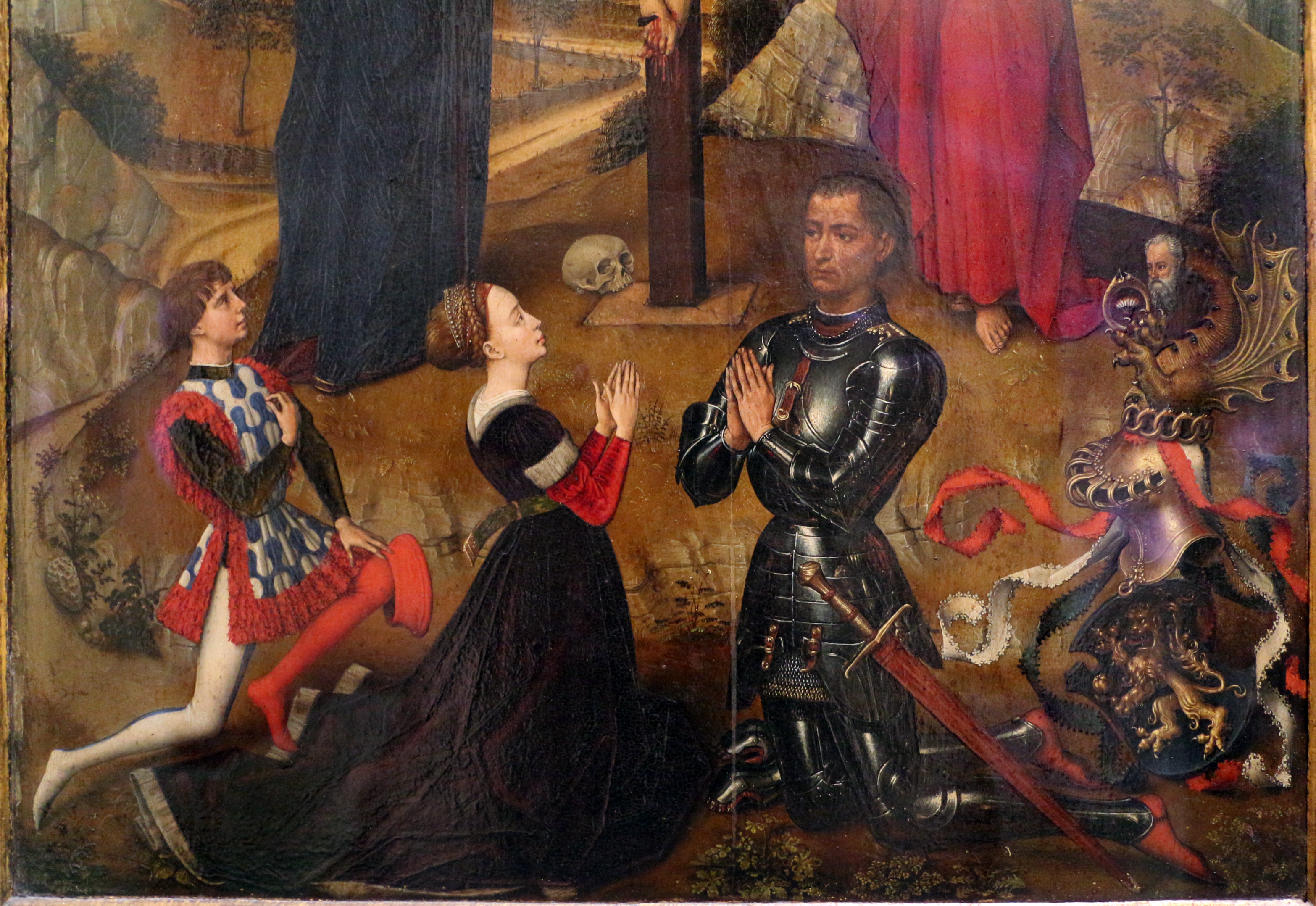
Alessandro Sforza on a detail of the Sforza Triptych by Rogier van der Weyden from circa 1460

In 1448, Cardinal Colonna arranged a marriage between the 14-year-old Sveva and Alessandro Sforza, lord of the city-state Pesaro. Alessandro was a widower with two children from his previous marriage (Battista and Costanzo) and two illegitimate daughters (Ginevra and Antonia). The couple were married by proxy on 9 January 1448, and a few months later Sveva traveled to Pesaro to join her new husband. Guglielmo Ebreo da Pesaro dedicated a ballo he choreographed for Sveva in honor of the wedding.

Many hagiographies describe the early marriage as a happy one, but another source mentions violent quarrels. In 1453, a series of letters to Alessandro from Benedetta Reguardati, the family physician, complain of Sveva's temperament and describe her as hysterical.

In 1456, Alessandro left to fight on behalf of his brother, Francesco I Sforza, Duke of Milan. During his six-year absence, Sveva raised her stepchildren, assisted by her aunt Vittoria Colonna and her cousin Elisabetta Malatesta, the children's grandmother. She also managed the Duchy of Pesaro in her husband's absence.

Upon his return, Alessandro began an affair with Pacifica Semperoli, the wife of a local doctor. He became convinced that Sveva and Vittoria were plotting against him with Sigismondo Pandolfo Malatesta and accused Sveva both of adultery and of trying to poison him. His abuse of Sveva escalated to public beatings and insults, repeated strangulation, and an attempted poisoning which left her partly paralyzed.

Eventually, Alessandro forced Sveva to leave their home and enter the local Poor Clare convent. He placed guards on the convent to prevent her from communicating with anyone outside, over the protests of the Colonna family. Alessandro's subsequent enquiries left him convinced of the truth of his suspicions, although some biographies maintain Sveva's innocence. According to Lèon de Clary's account, Sveva refused to answer Alessandro's questions, and he interpreted this as an admission of guilt. Sveva initially refused to become one of the Poor Clares, but after a number of threats from Alessandro, she took the habit and adopted the name Seraphina.

In 1473, Alessandro came to Seraphina's convent and asked for her forgiveness; he died later that year. Seraphina, who remained with the Poor Clares, was elected abbess in 1475, an office she held until her death on 8 September 1478.

== Veneration ==
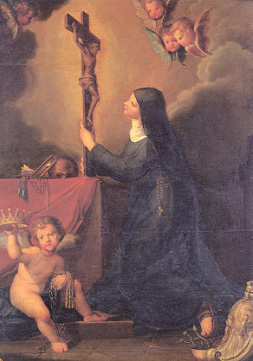
An 18th-century devotional painting depicting Seraphina as a Poor Clare nun

Seraphina died in the odour of sanctity in 1478. She was popularly venerated for her life of devotion and many miracles were attested at her tomb. When her body was exhumed some years later, it was found incorrupt. Pope Benedict XIV beatified Seraphina on 17 July 1754. Since 1810, her body has been preserved in Pesaro Cathedral.

Seraphina is commemorated as an example of a saintly Poor Clare and Franciscans observe her feast day on 9 September. Catholic hagiographies praise her for her many years of prayer for her husband's conversion. She is sometimes presented as an example of a holy stepmother or of holiness in an abusive marriage.
