= Lucrezia d'Este =

Lucrezia d'Este may refer to:

- Lucrezia d'Este (daughter of Ercole I) (born c. 1477), daughter of Ercole I d'Este, Duke of Ferrara, married Annibale II Bentivoglio (1467–1540)
- Lucrezia d'Este (daughter of Sigismondo) (before 1490 – after 1505), see Sigismondo d'Este (1433–1507) and Malaspina family
- Lucrezia d'Este (1535–1598), daughter of Ercole II d'Este, Duke of Ferrara
