= Ermes Bentivoglio =

Italian condottiero

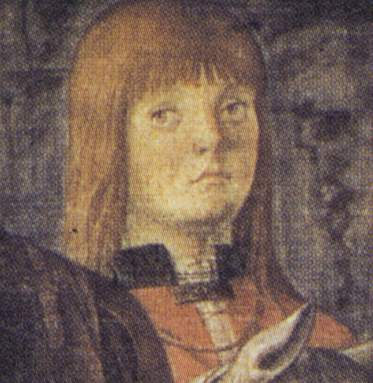
Ermes Bentivoglio.

Ermes Bentivoglio (1475–1513) was an Italian condottiero, the son of Giovanni II Bentivoglio, lord of Bologna, and Ginevra Sforza, daughter of Alessandro Sforza, lord of Pesaro.

== Biography ==
Ermes was born in Bologna. In 1492 he was created knight by Ercole I d'Este and entered to the military service of the latter. Six years later, together with his father and brothers, he was made Imperial Knight by Emperor Maximilian I. He frequently fought alongside his elder brother Annibale.

In 1501, by order of his mother Ginevra, he had several members of the Marescotti family, rivals of the Bentivoglio, killed. In 1504 he married Iacopa Orsini, daughter of Giulio Orsini. In 1506, when Pope Julius II ordered the Bentivoglio to leave Bologna, he took refuge first in Ferrara and then in Mantua, together with Annibale. A reward was raised against them by the Pope; in spite of it, the two brothers repeatedly attempted to reconquer their city until they succeeded in 1511, thanks the help of the French. Annibale was declared new lord of Bologna; the following year, however, once the French left the population rose against them and the Bentivoglio had to leave the city forever.

Ermes Bentivoglio was killed in 1513 by Prospero Colonna in the battle of Olmo, near Vicenza. According to other sources, he drowned in the Bacchiglione river during the retreat after the battle of Creazzo against the Spaniards.

He is portrayed, as a child, in Lorenzo Costa the Elder's Bentivoglio Altarpiece in San Giacomo Maggiore.

== See also ==
- War of the League of Cambrai
- Bartolomeo della Rocca

== Sources ==
- PAge at condottieridiventura.it (in Italian)
