= Giovanni Bentivoglio =

Giovanni Bentivoglio may refer to:

- Giovanni I Bentivoglio (c. 1358–1402), first ruler of Bologna from the Bentivoglio family
- Giovanni II Bentivoglio (1443–1508), Italian nobleman
