= Palazzo Bentivoglio =

Palazzo Bentivoglio may refer to:

- Palazzo Bentivoglio, Bologna
- Palazzo Bentivoglio, Ferrara
