= Muzio Attendolo Sforza =

Italian condottiero (1369–1424)

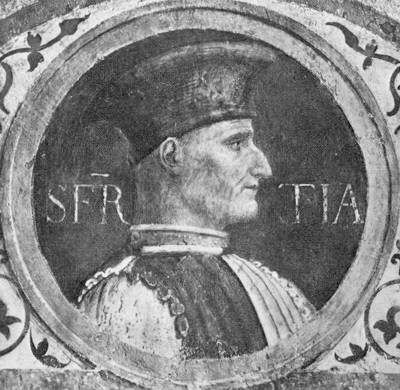
Muzio Attendolo Sforza

Muzio Attendolo Sforza (28 May 1369 – 4 January 1424) was an Italian condottiero. Founder of the Sforza dynasty, he led a Bolognese-Florentine army at the Battle of Casalecchio. In his later years, he served Queen Joanna II of Naples and was appointed Grand Constable of Naples, commanding her forces during a period of political instability.

He was the father of Francesco Sforza, who established the Sforza dynasty that governed the Duchy of Milan across multiple generations during the Renaissance.

== Biography ==
Giacomuzzo was born in 1369 in Cotignola (Romagna) to a rich family of rural nobility, son of Giovanni Attendolo (died 1385/1386) and Elisa. Muzio was the short form of the nickname of Giacomuzzo, which was the name of his paternal grandfather.

According to tradition, young Giacomo was ploughing a field when mercenaries led by Boldrino da Panicale passed nearby in search of recruits. He then stole one of his father's horses and followed the soldiers to follow the same career.

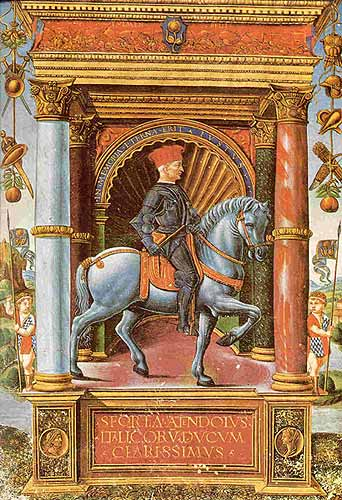
Muzio Attendolo in a 15th-century miniature

Later, together with his brothers Bosio, Francesco and Bartolo and two cousins, Muzio joined the company of Alberico da Barbiano, who nicknamed him "Sforza" ('Strong'). In 1398 he was at the service of Perugia against the Milanese troops of Gian Galeazzo Visconti, to whom Muzio soon switched his loyalty following the typical behaviour of mercenary chieftains of the time. Later Muzio fought for Florence against Visconti but in 1402, at the Battle of Casalecchio, was defeated by his former master Alberico da Barbiano. By 1409, he was in the employ of Niccolò III d'Este of Ferrara, who was being menaced by Ottobono Terzi of Parma.

King Ladislaus of Naples named him Gran Connestabile of his kingdom. Sforza's military qualities were mostly needed against Florence and the pope. He remained for the rest of his life in the Kingdom of Naples, after the king's death (1414), at the service of Queen Joanna II. However, he attracted the jealousy of Joan's favourite, Pandolfello Alopo, who had him arrested and imprisoned. However, when Sforza's troops intervened, Alopo freed him and Joan gave him the fiefdoms of Benevento and Manfredonia. On this occasion, Sforza married Caterina Alopo, Pandolfello's sister. A few months later Sforza was again arrested after a quarrel with James of Bourbon. He was freed only in 1416, after James' fall from power, and Joan gave him back the title of Conestabile.

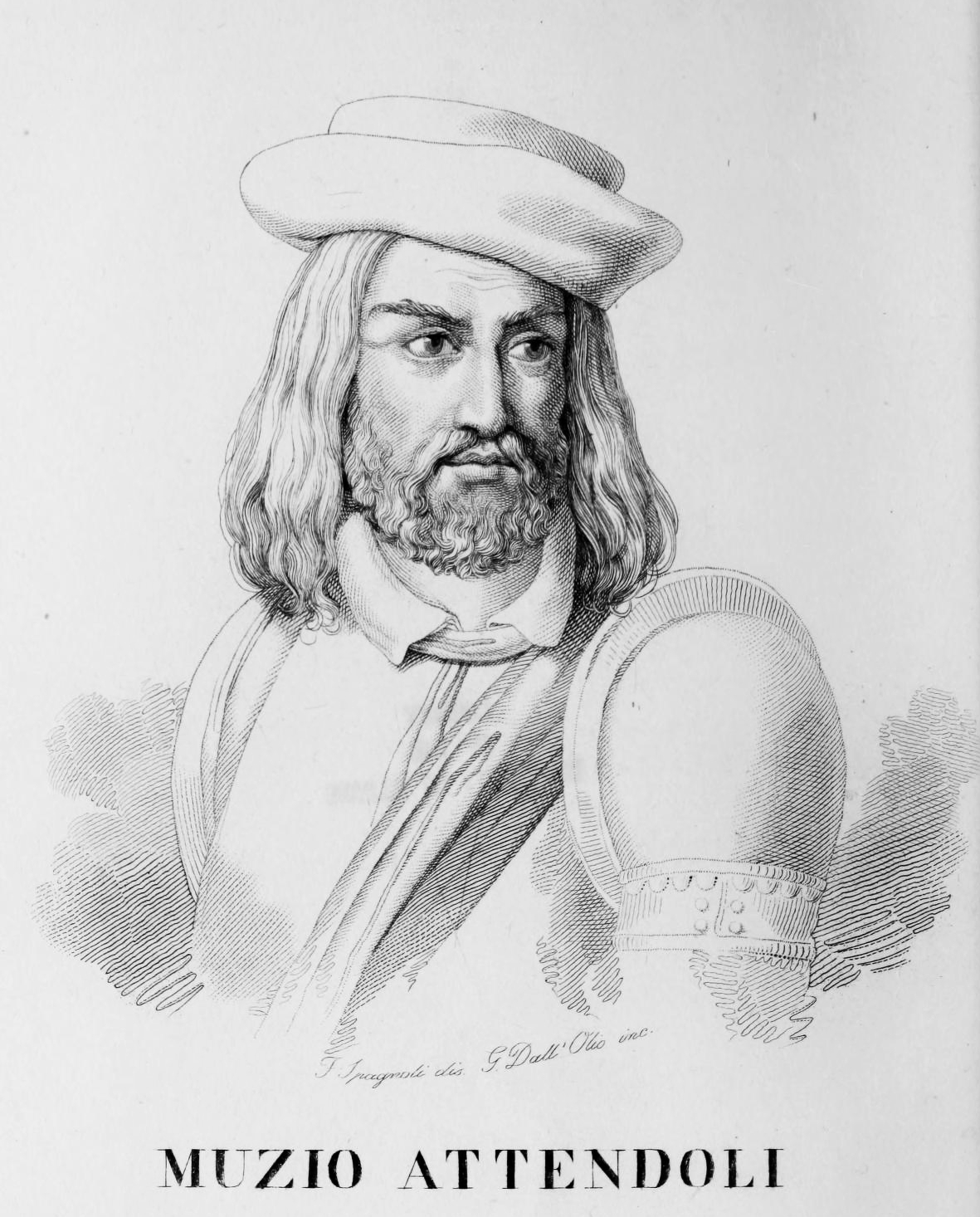
Muzio Attendolo

In 1417 Sforza was sent by Joan to help the pope against Braccio da Montone, together with his son Francesco. Later he returned briefly to Naples, but here he was opposed by Giovanni (Sergianni) Caracciolo, Joan's new lover. In the following, confused, events that led to the arrival of Louis III of Anjou in Naples in opposition to Alfonso V of Aragon, Sforza helped Joan and Sergianni to flee to Aversa.

In 1423, the city of L'Aquila rebelled against Braccio da Montone and he was sent to support it. In an attempt to save one of his pages during the fording of the River Pescara, Sforza drowned and his body was swept away by the waters.

== Family ==
Sforza had sixteen known children born from five marriages:

In 1409, Sforza married firstly with Antonia (died 1411), widow of Francesco Casali, Lord of Cortona and daughter of Francesco Salimbeni, Patrician of Siena and Lord of Chiusi, Radicofani, Bagno Vignoni, Carsoli and Sarteano. They had:

- Bosio (1410–1476), Count of Cotignola (1424), Lord of Castell'Arquato and Sovereign Count of Santa Fiora by virtue of his marriage (1439) with Cecilia Aldobrandeschi, Countess of Santa Fiora and Pitigliano.

On 16 June 1413, Sforza married secondly with Caterina (also named Catella; died 1418 in childbirth), a sister of Pandolfello Piscopo "Alopo", Grand Chamberlain of the Kingdom of Naples and lover of Joanna II of Naples. They had:

- Leonardo (1415–1438).
- Pietro (1417–1442), Bishop of Ascoli Piceno since 1438.
- Giovanna (born and died 1418).

In 1421, Sforza married thirdly with Maria (died 1440), daughter of Giacomo da Marzano, 1st Duke of Sessa, and Sovereign Countess of Celano after inheriting from her first husband Nicola de Berardi. They had:

- Bartolomeo (1420–1435), Count of Celano (1430).
- Carlo (15 June 1423 – 12 September 1457), later renamed Gabriele in his ordination, Archbishop of Milan since 1445.

With Tamira di Cagli, Sforza had two children:

- Mansueto (c. 1400–1467), Abbot of San Lorenzo of Cremona (1425).
- Onestina (1402–1422), a Benedictine nun.

With Lucia Terzani de Martini (or Lucia Demartini according to other sources; died 1461), They had:

- Francesco (23 July 1401 – 8 March 1466), Duke of Milan in 1450.
- Elisa (1402–1476), married in 1417 to Leonello of Sanseverino, Count of Cajazzo.
- Alberico (1403–1423).
- Antonia (16 January 1404 – 1471), married firstly in 1417 to Ardizzone da Carrara, Lord of Feltre, and secondly in 1442 to Manfredo da Barbiano.
- Leone (May 1406 – September 1440), condottiero; married in 1435 to Marsobilia Trinci di Foligno (died 1485). No issue.
- Giovanni (1407 – December 1451), condottiero; married in 1419 to Lavinia Lavello di Toscanella. No issue.
- Gregorio (29 October 1409 – April 1473), changed his name to Alessandro in honour to antipope Alexander V; Lord of Pesaro (1445).
- Orsola (1411–1460), a Clarisse nun.

Son and grandsons of Muzio Attendolo Sforza
Son: Francesco I Sforza; Duke of Milan	Grandson: Galeazzo Maria Sforza; 5th Duke of Milan	Grandson: Ludovico Sforza; 7th Duke of Milan

== Other ==
The Italian Regia Marina launched a cruiser called Muzio Attendolo in 1935. See also Condottieri-class cruiser.

== Sources ==
- Flavio, Biondo (2005). White, Jeffrey A. (ed.). Italy illuminated. Vol. 1. Harvard University Press.
- Ruggiero, Guido (2015). The Renaissance in Italy: A Social and Cultural History of the Rinascimento. Cambridge University Press.
- Santoro, Caterina (1992). Gli Sforza: La casata nobiliare che resse il Ducato di Milano dal 1450 al 1535 (in Italian). Casa Editrice Corbaccio.
- Covini, Nadia (2010). "Attendolo, Muzio". In Rogers, Clifford J. (ed.). The Oxford Encyclopedia of Medieval Warfare and Military Technology. Vol. 1. Oxford University Press. pp. 95–96.
- Lubkin, Gregory (1994). A Renaissance Court: Milan under Galleazzo Maria Sforza. University of California Press.
- Paolo Giovio, Vita di Muzio Attendolo
- Caterina Santoro, Gli Sforza, 1968
- Litta Biumi, Pompeo. Famiglie celebri italiane (in Italian). Milano: Luciano Basadonna Editore.
- Claudio Rendina, I Capitani di ventura, 1994
