= 1402 in Italy =

A timeline of events and dates in 1402 in Italy:

- Battle of Casalecchio

== Births ==
- Marco del Buono Giamberti (1402–1489) - Renaissance painter

== Deaths ==
- Giangaleazzo Visconti (1351–1402), Duke of Milan
