= Bartolomeo Triachini =

Italian architect

- Born: 1516
- Died: 1587 (aged 70–71)
- Occupation: Architect
- Known for: Palazzo Poggi

Bartolomeo Triachini or Bartolomeo Tassi (1516–1587) was a Bolognese architect.

== Life ==
Little is recorded about Triachini's life other than documents about his work. Triachini was a member of a charitable foundation, to which the painter Prospero Fontana (father of Lavinia Fontana) also belonged, that provided poor relief to parishioners. The Via Bartolomeo Triachini, a road in Bologna, is named after him.

== Work ==
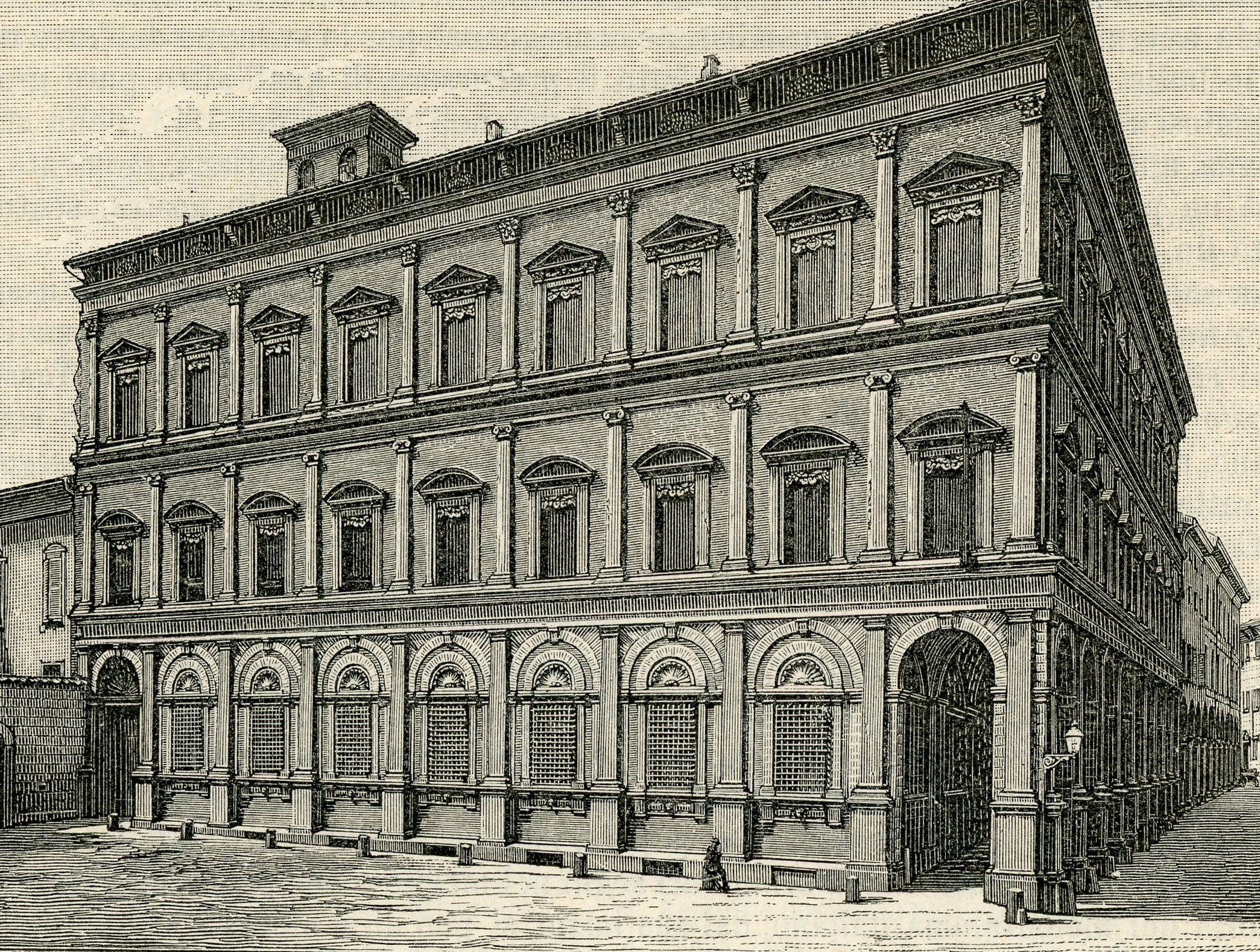
Palazzo Malvezzi de' Medici

Triachini's work followed local tradition, and in some ways was similar to that Domenico Tibaldi (1541-1583). His buildings combined classical simplicity and grandeur in their lines, as exemplified by the facade of the Palazzo Sanguinetti. He was often mentioned in documents about San Michele in Bosco and the monastery of the Trinity, since destroyed.

Triachini was responsible for the design of the Palazzo Lambertini, which was started around 1541 and completed in 1630. He created the court of the Palazzo Celesi, now part of the university. The design of the majestic and beautiful Palazzo Bentivoglio (1551) is attributed to Triachini. The Palazzo Nuovo, beside the complex of Rocca Isolani in the commune of Minerbio to the northeast of Bologna, was designed by Triachini with a faςade that features the motif of a loggia. This would become a common element of villas built in this period.

Other works in Bologna that have been attributed to him include the Palazzo Poggi (1549), Palazzo Vizzani (1549-1562) and Palazzo Malvezzi de' Medici (1560). He was apparently given the commission for the Palazzo Poggi by the Bishop Giovanni Poggio shortly before he was elevated to Cardinal. (Note: A manuscript by Lamo from 1560 attributes the Palazzo Poggi to Triachini, and this is confirmed by a document dated 1554 published by Zucchini.) However, other sources attribute the design of the Palazzo Poggi, which was built between 1549 and 1560, to Pellegrino Tibaldi. The Palazzo Malvezzi dates back to the 12th century. It was rebuilt after Triachini's design, with the work starting in 1560. The building is now the seat of the Provincial administration.

== Notes and references ==
Notes

Citations

Sources

- Accademia di Danimarca (2001). Analecta Romana Instituti Danici. "L'Erma" di Bretschneider.
- Barilli, Renato (2004). Maniera moderna e manierismo. Feltrinelli Editore. ISBN 978-88-07-10363-6.
- "Bartolomeo Triachini, Palazzo Benitvoglio (1551)". Comune di Bologna. Archived from the original on 2016-03-04.
- Bouchaud, Pierre de (1909). Bologne. Librairie Renouard, H. Laurens. p. 58.
- Cultural and Intellectual History Society (2000). Historein: A Review of the Past and Other Stories. Nefeli Publishers.
- Grieco, Romy; Clò, Oriano Tassinari (1988). Bologna: a city to discover. Italcards. ISBN 978-88-7193-002-2.
- "Minerbio". Provincia di Bologna.
- "Palazzo Malvezzi De' Medici". bolognawelcome.it. Municipality of Bologna.
- Ricci, Corrado (1923). Architecture and decorative sculpture of the high and late renaissance in Italy. Brentano's.
- Rubbi, Valeria (2010). L'architettura del Rinascimento a Bologna. Passione e filologia nello studio di Francesco Malaguzzi Valeri. Con CD-ROM. Editrice Compositori. ISBN 978-88-7794-707-9.
- "Triachini, Bartolomeo". Enciclopedia Italiana. Treccani.
- "Via Bartolomeo Triachini, Bologna". Archived from the original on 2013-02-17.
