= Palazzo Malvezzi de' Medici =

Italian palace

Coordinates: 44.4953°N 11.3484°E

The Palazzo Malvezzi de' Medici is a Renaissance-style palace located on Via Zamboni #13 in central Bologna, Italy. The palace now houses the offices of the Provincial Administration.

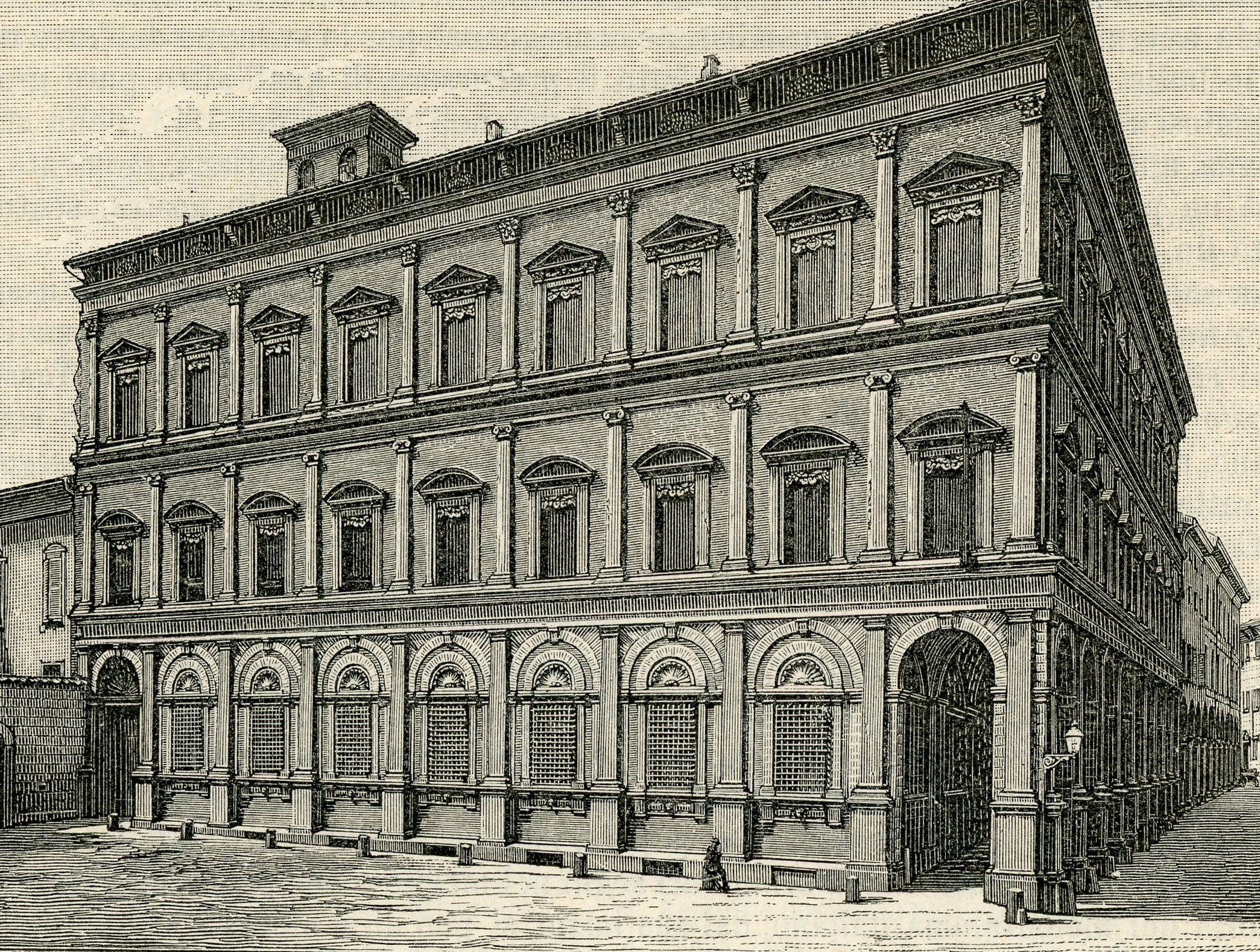
Palazzo Malvezzi de' Medici.

== History ==
Construction of the palace was commissioned in 1560 by the widow of Giovanni di Bartolomeo Malvezzi, Paola di Antonio Maria Campeggi; the design was by Bartolomeo Triachini. The facade rises on the narrow street of San Donato.

In 1725 the Marquis Giuseppe Maria Malvezzi de' Medici (1670–1736) commissioned the design of the scenic staircase from Ferdinando Galli-Bibiena and construction completed by Alfonso Torreggiani. In the mid-nineteenth century, Giovanni Malvezzi (1819–1892), refurbished the palace under the direction of Francesco Cocchi. In 1931 the building was sold by Aldobrandino Malvezzi (1881–1961), professor at the University of Florence, to the Province of Bologna.

== Interiors ==
The rooms of the main floor maintain much of Cocchi's 19th-century wall decor.

The Sala dello Zodiaco has ceiling frescoes of the zodiac. The room also exhibits the Martyrdom of Saint Eufemia by Gabriele Ferrantini, a Martyrdom of St Ursula by Giacinto Campana, and a St Peter and a St Paul, both 19th-century copies by Andrea Bèsteghi of 17th-century originals by Bartolomeo Cesi.

The Anticamera della sala Consiglio has ceilings frescoed with Minerva and Apollo with the Muses. The Sala di Giunta has ceilings frescoed by Cocchi and two wall canvases respectively depicting Marco Minghetti and Andrea Costa.

The Sala Rosa or degli Amori has a ceiling frescoed by Girolamo Dalpane with scenes from the Decameron. Four images depict images of famous writers and their respective muses: Tasso and Eleonora; Boccaccio and Fiammetta; Dante and Beatrice; and Petrarch and Laura. In eight ovals are depicted famous women from Italian history: Giulia Gonzaga, Violante Giustiniani, Ginevra Bentivoglio, Beatrice degli Obizzi, Vittoria Colonna, Maria di Monferrato, Bianca Sforza, and Maria d'Aragona.

The Sala Verde has a ceiling depicting Triumph of Bacchus and Ariadne. The walls have two portraits by Carlo Berti Pichat and a copy of Guido Reni's Joseph and the Wife of Potiphar.
