= Bentivoglio Altarpiece =

1488 painting by Lorenzo Costa

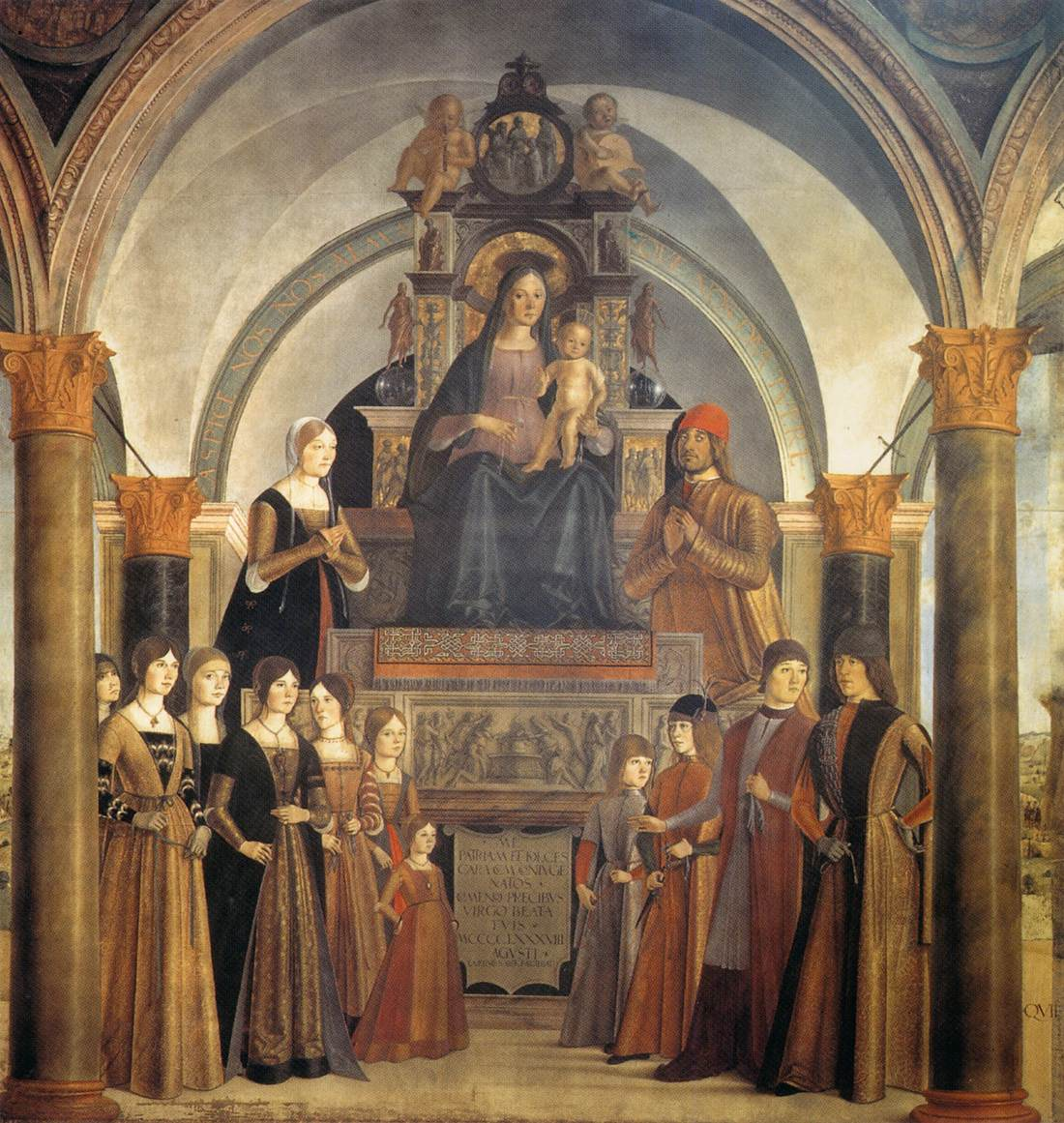
- Artist: Lorenzo Costa
- Year: 1488
- Medium: Oil on panel
- Location: San Giacomo Maggiore, Bologna

The Bentivoglio Altarpiece is a painting by the Italian Renaissance painter Lorenzo Costa, dating to August 1488. It is displayed in the Bentivoglio Chapel of the church of San Giacomo Maggiore, Bologna, Italy.

It was commissioned by Giovanni II Bentivoglio, lord of Bologna, as a thanksgiving for the family's escape from an attempted massacre by the Malvezzi family.

== Description ==
The painting is a large canvas, executed by Costa together with other two works on the chapel's walls, the Triumph of Fame and the Triumph of Death. It features, above a sumptuous Renaissance architecture, a marble altar with a rich frieze; at the top of is a throne on which the Madonna and Child sit. At the sides, kneeling, are the two donor husband and wife, Giovanni II Bentivoglio and Ginevra Sforza. In the foreground, at the feet of the throne, are their eleven children. On the left are the daughters (from left, Camilla, Bianca, Francesca, Violante - future spouse of Pandolfo IV Malatesta, Laura, Isotta and Eleonora); on the right the four children (Ermes, Alessandro, Anton Galeazzo and the elder one, Annibale).

== Sources ==
- Raule, Angelo (1958). "Intorno alla Madonna dei Bentivoglio: note d'arte e di storia". Strenna storica bolognese. pp. 159–191.
