= Giovanni I Bentivoglio =

Ruler of Bologna from 1401 to 1402

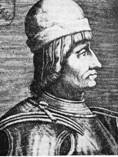
Giovanni I Bentivoglio

Giovanni I (c. 1358 in Bologna – June 26, 1402 in Bologna) was the first ruler of Bologna from the Bentivoglio family, who rose to power among the faction-conflicts within the commune of Bologna. He ruled in 1401–1402.

On March 14, 1401, he declared himself the ruler as signore and Gonfaloniere di Giustizia, and secured his reign with the aid of the Visconti family. After the Visconti turned against him, he was killed in 1402 in the Battle of Casalecchio. He was later buried in the church of San Giacomo Maggiore. He was briefly succeeded by his son, Antongaleazzo, who was soon deposed. The next person to fully restore the power of the house was his grandson, Annibale I.

Preceded by To the Papal States	Ruler of Bologna; 1401–1402	Succeeded by Antongaleazzo Bentivoglio
