= Bentivoglio family =

Italian noble family

- Patrician noble family
- Arms of the House of Bentivoglio
- Parent family: Hohenstaufen (claimed)
- Country: Papal States
- Founded: 1401; 625 years ago
- Founder: Giovanni I Bentivoglio
- Final ruler: Annibale II Bentivoglio
- Titles: Signore of Bologna
- Motto: NUNC MICHI (Ora è il mio momento; "Now is my time")
- Estate: Palazzo Bentivoglio, Bologna
- Deposition: 1512; 514 years ago

The Bentivoglio family (Latin: Bentivoius) was an Italian noble family whose members became the de facto rulers of Bologna during the Renaissance.

== History ==
The presence in Bologna of the Bentivoglio family is first recorded in 1323. Originally from the castle of that name in the neighborhood of Bologna, the family claimed descent from Enzio, King of Sardinia, an illegitimate son of Frederick II, Holy Roman Emperor.

During the fourteenth century, the family, belonging to one of the worker's guilds at Bologna, had gained power as pro-papist Guelph leaders in the fourteenth century. Amid the faction-conflicts of the commune, on 14 March 1401, Giovanni I Bentivoglio, with the help of Gian Galeazzo Visconti, declared himself signore and Gonfaloniere di Giustizia. The Visconti however soured on Giovanni, and he was defeated and killed on 26 June 1402 at the Battle of Casalecchio and was interred in the church of San Giacomo Maggiore.

During the next few decades, the city's political status -and the family's fortunes- remained unpredictable. The son of Giovanni I, Anton Galeazzo (or Antongaleazzo, c. 1385–1435), was a lecturer in civil law who briefly assumed power in Bologna in 1420, but was quickly overthrown. He became a condottiero, and was assassinated by papal officials in 1435. During his reign the Bentivoglio received the fief of Castel Bolognese.

In 1438 Annibale I Bentivoglio, a putative son of Anton Galeazzo, led a city revolt against the Papacy. He tried to make peace with the Visconti of Milan and to convince the Pope not to place Bologna under papal dominion. In 1442, the Visconti condottiere Niccolò Piccinino imprisoned Annibale and his supporters at Varano, but Annibale was freed by Galeazzo Marescotti in 1442. When Annibale returned to Bologna, the powers of government were conferred to him, a sign that the city recognized the family's political importance. However, Annibale would be assassinated in 1445.

Annibale was succeeded by Sante I (1426–1463). Sante was also of dubious paternity and origin, but alleged to be a son of Ercole Bentivoglio, a cousin of Annibale I. Originally an apprentice of the wool guild of Florence, Sante ruled as signore of Bologna from 1442. Counseled by Cosimo de' Medici, Sante Bentivoglio ushered in a brief period of political tranquility. Bologna also strengthened its relations with Venice, Milan, and Florence.

Sante was succeeded by Giovanni II (1443–1508), the son of Annibale I, who ruled as virtual tyrant of Bologna. In 1506, the noble Bentivoglio family was brought to ruin by Pope Julius II when he expelled Giovanni II from Bologna.

A son of Giovanni II, Annibale II (1469–1540), married Lucrezia d'Este, an illegitimate daughter of Duke Ercole I of Ferrara, in 1487. He served as a condottiero. During a rebellion in 1511 against Julius II, Annibale II with the help of the French took control o Bologna, but he was able to rule for only a year. He was hated by other rival families, such as the Ghislieri and the Canetoli, and was subsequently assassinated. Annibale II was the last ruler of his line. In exile, the Bentivoglio family established themselves in Ferrara and produced several notable prelates.

== Rulers of Bologna ==
| Portrait | Signore | Tenure | | Notes |
|---|---|---|---|---|
| | Giovanni I Bentivoglio | 1401 | 1402 | First signore of Bologna. Killed in the Battle of Casalecchio. |
1402–1403: integrated to Duchy of Milan.
1403–1416: Signoria of Cardinal Baldassarre Cossa.
| | Anton Galeazzo Bentivoglio | 3 March 1416 | 23 December 1435 | Restored signore after led a rebellion against Cardinal Cossa. Murdered by assassins hired by Bishop Daniele Scotto. |
1435–1443: Signoria of Niccolò Piccinino.
| | Annibale I Bentivoglio | 14 August 1443 | 24 June 1445 | Overthrown pro-Milan signoria of Piccinino. Elected head of the 16 Reformers (Bologna's ruling body) in 1445. Murdered in the same year by seditious nobles. |
| | Sante Bentivoglio | 24 June 1445 | 1 October 1463 | Grew up in Cosimo de' Medici's house. Cousin of Annibale I and regent for his nephew Giovanni II. Died of natural causes in 1463. |
| | Giovanni II Bentivoglio | 1 October 1463 | 2 November 1506 | Son of Annibale I. He tried to maintain peace with ambitious neighbourhoods Medici, Sforza and the Holy See. Became a vassal of Cesare Borgia in 1501. After internal turmoils, he fled from Bologna in 1506, who was conquered by Pope Julius II. Died in Milan two years later. |
| | Annibale II Bentivoglio | May 1511 | May 1512 | Son of Giovanni II. Restored by French forces during the League of Cambrai. Exiled again after French defeat. Came to agreement with Papacy in 1529, he obtained family's properties return and retired any claim over Bologna. Died in 1540 in Ferrara. |

== Other notable family members ==
Ercole Bentivoglio, the putative father of Sante I who lived in exile in Florence and Ferrara, wrote a long poem on dietetic, greatly extolling the medical properties of cheese. He also wrote satirical works.

The Bentivoglio Family, expelled from Bologna in 1506, established themselves in Ferrara, where they produced some important prelates, such as:

- Cardinal Guido Bentivoglio (1579–1644), though a disciple of Galileo, was one of the Inquisitors-General who signed his condemnation. Papal diplomat and historian of the Flanders War in his work Della Guerra di Fiandra.
- Cardinal Cornelio Bentivoglio (1668–1732).

The third son of Giovanni II, Alessandro Bentivoglio, who had married Ippolita Sforza, became a counselor of the last duke of Milan and later governor of the town (1525), giving origin to a lombard branch of the family.

A notable recent member of the family is Galeazzo Benti, originally Galeazzo Bentivoglio, 20th century actor.

== Power base ==
The Church of San Giacomo Maggiore, originally built in the mid-13th century, was adopted in the 15th century by the Bentivoglio family as the center of their power base in the surrounding neighborhood, and they embellished the church accordingly. It included the tomb of Anton Galeazzo Bentivoglio by Jacopo della Quercia and the Bentivoglio family's own private chapel, the altar of which has some striking artwork by Lorenzo Costa depicting family victories over other Bolognese dynasties.

== Sources ==
- Ady, C.M. (1937). The Bentivoglio of Bologna: A Study in Dispotism. Oxford.
- Rendina, Claudio (1998). I capitani di ventura. Rome: Newton Compton.
