= Alessandro Sforza =

Italian condottiero (1409–1473)

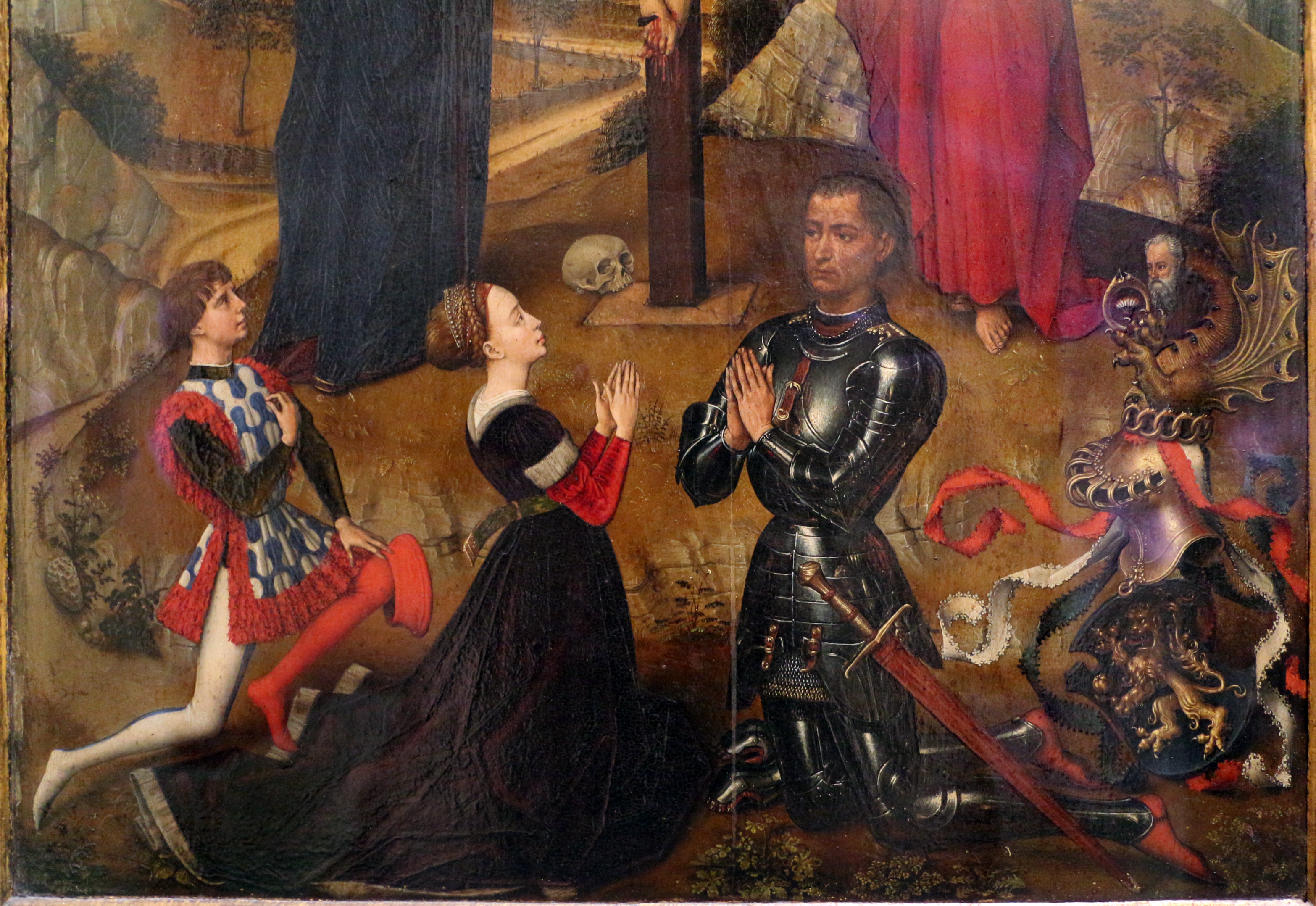
Alessandro Sforza in circa 1460 on a detail of the Sforza Triptych by Rogier van der Weyden

Alessandro Sforza (21 October 1409 – 3 April 1473) was an Italian condottiero and lord of Pesaro, the first of the Pesaro line of the Sforza family.

== Biography ==
He was born in Cotignola in 1409, an illegitimate son of the famous condottiero Muzio Attendolo Sforza. and Lucia Terzani (or Tregani) de Martini from Torgiano.

Alessandro's birth-name was originally Gregorio but was later changed to Alessandro in honor of the antipope Alexander V. He was the youngest of the sixteen known children born from the marriages and relationships of Sforza.

Alessandro's parents had seven children in all and it is thought that Alessandro's mother was of good birth, but without fortune or important connections and that she entered into a relationship with Sforza on the assumption that they would be married. Instead Sforza would go on to marry Antonia Salimbeni, a Siennese noblewoman. His father arranged for Alessandro's mother to wed one of the men under his command, the captain Mario Fogligno of Ferrara.

Thus Alessandro and his elder brother were educated in Ferrara where their mother resided.

== Military career ==
Alessandro collaborated actively with his brother Francesco in his military campaign, and with him he conquered Milan, Alessandria and Pesaro. In 1435, at Fiordimonte, he won the battle in which the riotous Niccolò Fortebraccio was killed. In 1442 at Assisi he commanded the troops besieged by Pope Eugene IV's condottiero Francesco Piccinino. He was forced to leave the city, abandoning the city to ravages and massacres. In 1444 he obtained the lordship of Pesaro by Galeazzo Malatesta. Here he enlarged the Ducal Palace to conform it to the Renaissance standards.

During the Wars in Lombardy in support of Francesco he presided Parma and, in February 1446, he proclaimed himself lord of the city. After Francesco's conquest of the Duchy of Milan, the Peace of Lodi (1454) confirmed him in Parma.

In 1464 he obtained by Pope Pius II the seigniory of Gradara, which he defended by the Malatesta attempts of reconquest.

In 1465 the condottiero Jacopo Piccinino had been summoned to Naples to receive the position as viceroy of Abruzzi and serve as leader of King Ferdinand I of Naples's troops. Instead Piccinino was arrested, and died under mysterious circumstances. Suspicion pointed to his death being due to his father-in-law Francesco Sforzas machinations.

Piccinino had been married just nine months earlier to Francesco's illegitimate daughter and Alessandro's niece Drusiana. Drusiana believing her father's guilt and being pregnant sought refuge with her uncle in Teramo.

== Death ==
He died in 1473 from an attack of apoplexy. His son Costanzo succeeded him in Pesaro.

== Family ==
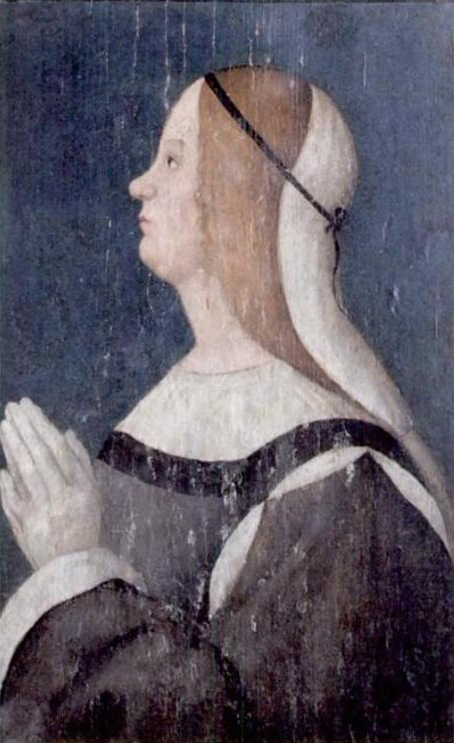
Sforza's second wife Sveva da Montefeltro, also known as Blessed Seraphina after her beatification in 1754

He married Costanza Varano (1428–1447), the daughter of Pietro Gentile I da Varano, on 8 December 1444. She died while bearing Costanzo. The following year he married Sveva da Montefeltro (1434–1478), daughter of Guidantonio da Montefeltro, count of Urbino. In 1457, fearing a possible conjure of the Malatesta family to regain the seigniory of Pesaro, he obliged her to become a nun in a monastery in the city.

By Costanza he had two children, Battista (1446–1472), who became the wife of Federico III of Urbino, and Costanzo.

He also had two illegitimate daughters, Ginevra (c. 1440–1507) and Antonia (c. 1445–1500). Ginevra is known as a patron of the visual and literary arts. She married Sante Bentivoglio in 1454 and, after his death, Giovanni II Bentivoglio, duke of Bologna. Antonia married Ottavio Martinengo delle Palle in 1460, who died in Brescia in 1485.

== Notes ==
| Preceded by Galeazzo Malatesta | Lord of Pesaro; 1444–1473 | Succeeded by Costanzo I Sforza |
