= Battle of Casalecchio =

1402 battle in Italy

Coordinates: 44.4833°N 11.2833°E

- Part of the Third Florentine–Milanese War
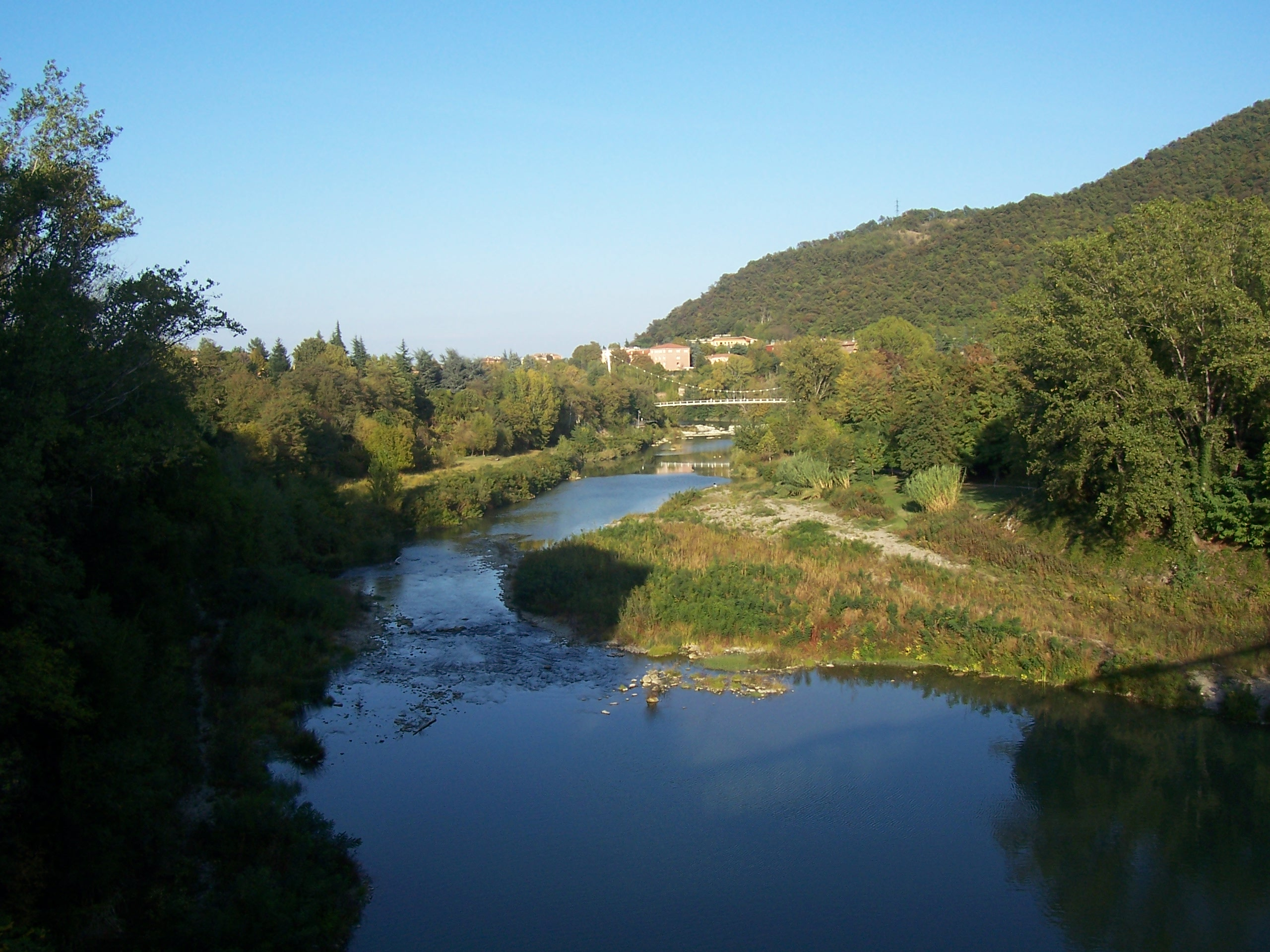
- Casalecchio di Reno
Date	26 June 1402
Location	Casalecchio di Reno
Result	Milanese victory

Belligerents
Milan	Bologna; Florence

Commanders and leaders
Gian Galeazzo Visconti; Alberico da Barbiano; Facino Cane; Jacopo Dal Verme	Giovanni I Bentivoglio; Muzio Attendolo

Strength
8,000 Milanese cavalry great number infantry	5,000 Florentine cavalry several infantry brigades

Casualties and losses
Unknown	Unknown

The Battle of Casalecchio took place on 26 June 1402 near the town of Casalecchio di Reno, near Bologna, in northern Italy.

A Bolognese army under Giovanni Bentivoglio opposed Gian Galeazzo Visconti, Duke of Milan. The city of Bologna was aided by the Republic of Florence that supplied 5,000 cavalry (Rose Brigade) commanded by Bernardo della Serra. The Lord of Padua sent cavalry and supplies along with two of his sons.

Visconti was aided by the Malatesta of Rimini and the Gonzaga of Mantua. With Facino Cane, the condottiero Ludovico Gabriotto Cantelli (Ludovico da Parma) commanded the Milanese vanguard of 8,000 cavalry.

The Bolognese-Florentine army was led by Muzio Attendolo, while the Milanese army was commanded by Alberico da Barbiano and Jacopo Dal Verme.

== Battle ==
Barbiano had encamped the Milanese forces and initiated skirmishes with the Bolognese-Florentine troops. The Bolognese-Florentines appeared to have gained the advantage from this skirmish, so Bentivoglio ordered Bernardo's forces into the fray. Bernardo refused and Bentivoglio marched his forces out and encamped, well fortified, at Casalecchio.

A few days later, after much discussion, the Milanese force marched in tight, orderly formation towards the Bolognese-Florentine camp. Caught completely by surprise, the Bolognese-Florentine army retreated leaving their camp in the hands of the Milanese. The Rose Brigade, which had withdrawn to higher ground to evaluate the situation, fled along with 200 lancers.

Giovanni Bentivoglio was captured and killed two days later. Gian Galeazzo Visconti took Bologna and planned to assault the Republic of Florence and city of Florence next. However, he fell ill on 10 August 1402 and died on 3 September.

== Sources ==
- Black, Jane (2009). Absolutism in Renaissance Milan: Plenitude of Power Under the Visconti and the Sforza 1329-1535. Oxford University Press.
- Morelli, Giovanni di Paolo (2015). "Memoirs". In Branca, Vittore (ed.). Merchant Writers: Florentine Memoirs from the Middle Ages and Renaissance. University of Toronto Press.
- de Sismondi, J. C. L. (2008). A History of the Italian Republics. Wildside Press.
