= Sante Bentivoglio =

Italian nobleman

Sante I Bentivoglio (1426–June 24, 1462) was an Italian nobleman who ruled Bologna from 1445 to 1462.

== Early life ==
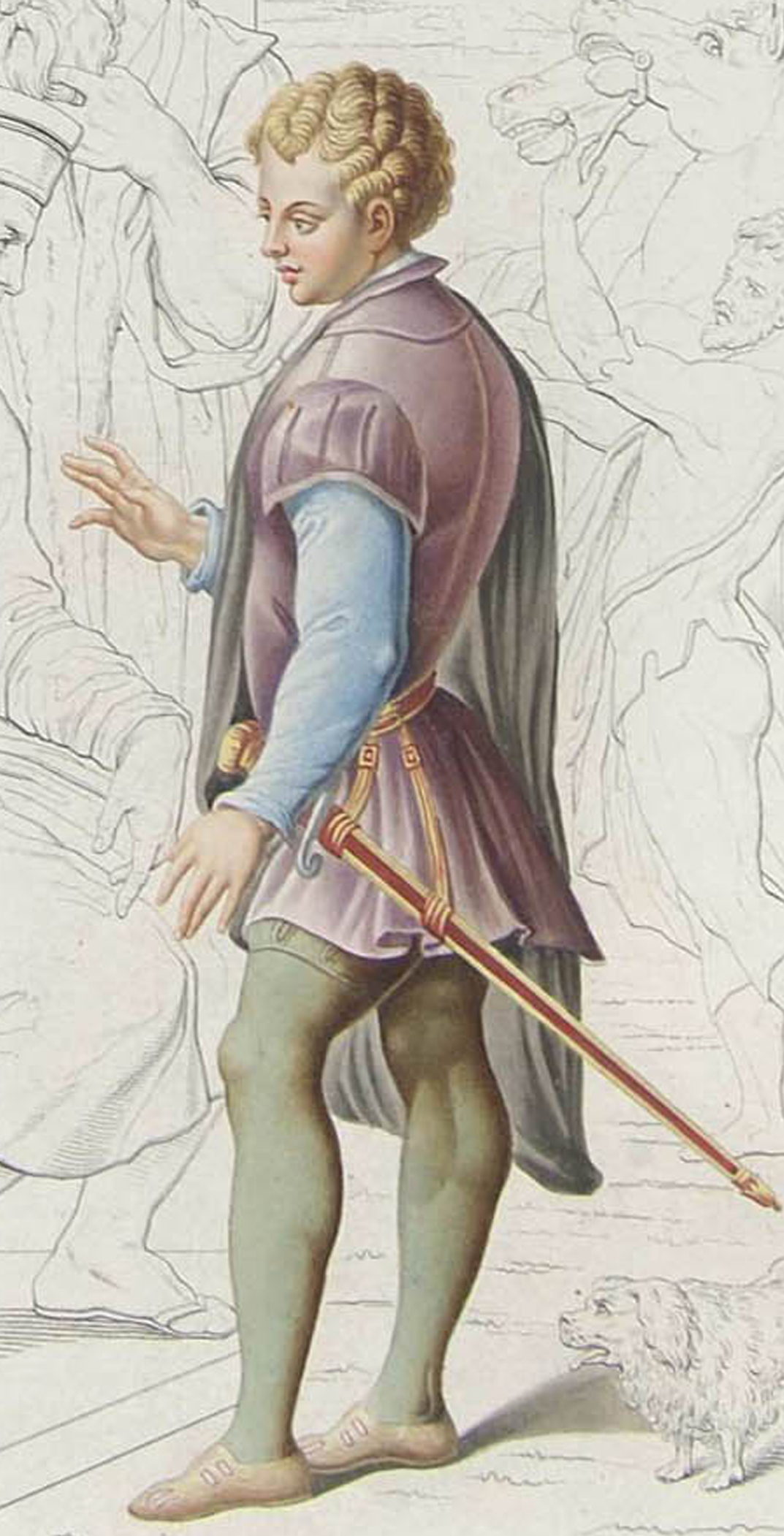
Sante Bentivoglio

Officially the son of a poor blacksmith, he worked as a youth in the wool industry in Florence under another name, until he was alleged to be a son of Ercole Bentivoglio. He was educated at Florence in the court of Cosimo de' Medici the Elder. Through his putative noble father, Sante could claim to be a cousin of Annibale I Bentivoglio, at the time ruler of Bologna (also of dubious paternity).

== Gonfaloniere di Giustizia ==
When Annibale was killed in an ambush by a rival family, the people of Bologna gave him control of city government with the title of Gonfaloniere di Giustizia. He was named the sole tutor of Annibale's son, Giovanni. The event transformed Sante from a Florentine popolano into the virtual prince of Bologna. It was with Sante Bentivoglio's seizure of power, encouraged by the Duke of Milan, that the Signoria was ultimately established in Bologna.

In 1454 he married Ginevra Sforza, then fourteen years old, the daughter of Alessandro Sforza, lord of Pesaro, establishing his family's close relationship with the Sforza dynasty. The two had two daughters: Costanza (1458–1491), who married Antonmaria Pico della Mirandola, and Ercola (1459–1505). His son Ercole (1459-1507) became a condottiero and fought for Florence in several wars.

In 1457 the Pope and Sante Bentivoglio created a mixed constitutional state in Bologna. In 1460 Sante started building the Palazzo Bentivoglio, which was destroyed in 1507 after the Bentivoglio was ousted from Bologna. He obtained from the Pope control over the city and established a communal senate including local nobles and Papal representatives. He worked in cooperation with the representatives of the Pope: Pius II visited Bologna two times in 1458 and 1459. He did not trust Sante however and said on one occasion: "The blood of my own kin has taught me a bitter lesson as to the little faith that can be placed in priests."

== Alliances ==
He allied with the Republic of Venice, the House of Sforza and the house of Medici, playing on the Venetian fear of both Milan and Florence. He died in Bologna in 1462 due to illness, being succeeded by Giovanni II Bentivoglio, Annibale's son, who later remarried his widow Ginevra.

The great Bolognese historian Cherubino Ghirardacci wrote that 'Sante Bentivoglio had achieved the highest reputation, not just among the citizens of Bologna, but also among the lords of Italy, which was a marvellous thing'.

Preceded by Annibale I Bentivoglio	Ruler of Bologna; 1445–1462	Succeeded by Giovanni II Bentivoglio
