= Teresa Carniani =

Italian poet

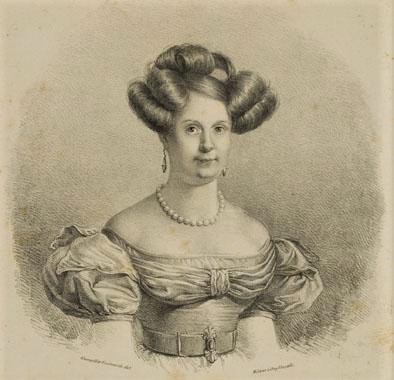
Teresa Carniani

Teresa Carniani Malvezzi de' Medici (28 March 1785 in Florence – 9 January 1859 in Bologna) was an Italian poet, writer, and translator. She was married into the influential Medici family and held the title of countess. She is best remembered for her publications La cacciata del tiranno Gualtieri accaduta in Firenze l'anno 1343 (1827) and In morte di Vincenzo Monti (1829), and her translations of Francesco Petrarch, Marcus Tullius Cicero, and Alexander Pope. She was also known by her pseudonym Luisa Camilla.
