= Ippolita Sforza =

Ippolita Sforza may refer to:

- Ippolita Maria Sforza (1445–1488), daughter of Francesco I Sforza, wife of King Alfonso II of Naples
- Ippolita Sforza (1481–1521), wife of Alessandro Bentivoglio
- Ippolita Maria Sforza (1493–1501), daughter of Gian Galeazzo Maria Sforza
