= Palazzo Bentivoglio, Bologna =

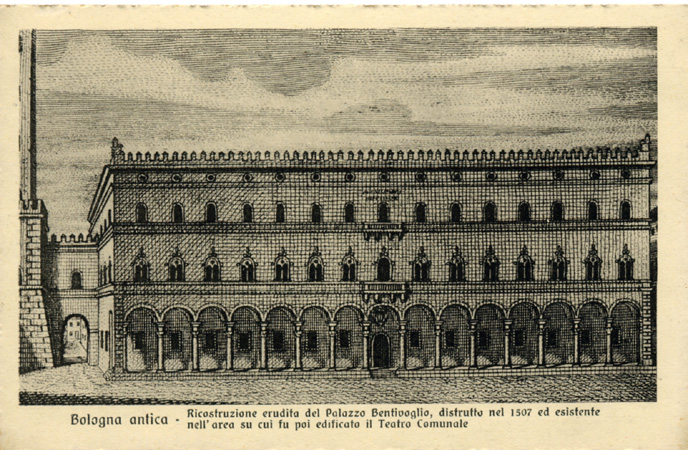
18th Century reconstruction of the Bentivoglio Palace in Bologna, destroyed in 1507

The original Palazzo Bentivoglio was a palace in Bologna, which was destroyed by a mob in 1507. A second palace by the same name was built nearby, and is still standing.

== History ==
The palace of the noble Bolognese family of Bentivoglio was built on the orders of Sante Bentivoglio, in Via San Donato (today Via Zamboni), starting in 1460, and was subsequently completed by Giovanni II Bentivoglio. Contemporary chroniclers and scholars have attempted to reconstruct the appearance of the great house on the basis of often enthusiastic descriptions. The main facade facing onto Via San Donato measured 30 meters, while the sides were over 140 meters in length. Located on the ground floor were the apartments of the men of the house of Bentivoglio, while the upper floor held the apartment of Giovanni II, richly frescoed, and the equally sumptuous apartment of Ginevra Sforza and the other women of the house. The building also housed guards and soldiers and included guest rooms, warehouses and depots of arms. The building had 244 rooms in total. In it, the Bentivoglio received illustrious visitors and friends, and hosted extravagant dinners and parties.

== Destruction ==
The building was destroyed by popular fury in the spring of 1507. The decision to destroy it was made by the enemies of the Bentivoglio family, who had come to see their rule of Bologna as tyrannous and had co-operated with Pope Julius II to bring about their expulsion from the city in late 1506. The city's new rulers were convinced that it was necessary to raze the house of tyrants if you wanted to prevent their return, and the Senate accordingly decreed that any emblem or sign of the Bentivoglios' past domination must be destroyed. The destruction of the palace in Via San Donato was, however, a great loss for the history of Italian art. Today the area where the palace stood is occupied by the Teatro Comunale, adjacent to Via del Guasto ("Ruin Road"), whose name recalls the fate of the Bentivoglio palace. The modern Giardino del Guasto, a small public garden created in 1975 by the architect Rino Filippini, covers the area formerly occupied by the garden of the palace.

== Later developments ==
A little further on, in Via Delle Belle Arti, stands the imposing new Palazzo Bentivoglio. It was built, starting in 1551, by Costanzo Bentivoglio, a descendant of a collateral branch (non-dominant) of the family. The architect Bartolomeo Triachini is attributed with the design of the majestic and beautiful later palace. The entrance leads into a spacious courtyard surrounded by a double loggia that was based on designs by Domenico Tibaldi. It was completed by Giovanni Battista Falcetti in the first half of the seventeenth century. The upper floor of the new palace has a number of halls that have ceilings and friezes from the Tibaldi school. There is a large gallery painted by in chiaroscuro style Antonio Bonetti with sculptures by Ubaldo Gandolfi. The gallery was opened in 1769 when senator Fulvio Bentivoglio became Gonfaloniere of Bologna.

== Notes and references ==
Citations

Sources

- Antonelli, Armando; Poli, Marco (2006). Il palazzo dei Bentivoglio nelle fonti del tempo. Venezia: Marsilio. ISBN 8831791958.
- "Bartolomeo Triachini, Palazzo Benitvoglio (1551)". Comune di Bologna. Archived from the original on 2016-03-04.

Further reading

- Carlo Pancaldi, Descrizione storica del palazzo Bentivoglio atterrato nell'anno 1507, in "Almanacco Statistico Bolognese" (1830), pp. 145–160,
- Pier Luigi Perazzini, Nuovi documenti riguardanti il distrutto palazzo Bentivoglio di strada San Donato, in "Strenna storica bolognese", 47 (1997), pp. 405–424
- Pier Luigi Perazzini, Nuovi documenti riguardanti il distrutto palazzo Bentivoglio di strada San Donato, 2, in "Strenna storica bolognese", 50 (2000), pp. 395–414
- Un signore allo specchio: il ritratto e il palazzo di Giovanni II Bentivoglio, catalogo della Mostra tenuta a Bologna nel 2003 a cura di Vera Fortunati, Bologna 2003
