= Annibale I Bentivoglio =

Italian noble (1415–1445)

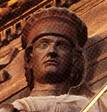

Annibale I Bentivoglio (August 1415 – 24 June 1445) was a member of the Bolognese Bentivoglio family and the absolute ruler of the Italian city of Bologna from 1443 until his death.

He was a putative son of Antongaleazzo Bentivoglio, although his mother, the Sienese Lina Canigiani, was said to be uncertain of the boy's paternity and the matter was decided by dice. He was named Annibale after the Carthaginian general. As a child, he was exiled from his native city due to his father's strong anti-Papal stance, and lived an errant life during the years of his youth. In 1438, he returned in Bologna, contributing to its liberation from the alien Milanese Visconti rule. In 1442 however, he was imprisoned by the Perugian condotierro Niccolò Piccinino (at that time at war with the Duke of Milan) in the castle of Varano, from where he was later freed in 1443 by Tideo and Galeazzo Marescotti.

Bentivoglio was then made effective ruler of Bologna, but was stabbed to death less than two years later by a member of a rival family, Bettozzo Carietoli, with the silent support of Pope Eugene IV. He was quickly succeeded in the government of Bologna by a vague putative cousin, Sante Bentivoglio, who was also made the sole tutor of his infant son Giovanni, born from his marriage with Donnina Visconti.

An equestrian statue of Annibale I Bentivoglio is ascribed to the Dalmatian Early Renaissance sculptor Niccolò dell'Arca.

Preceded by To the Duchy of Milan	Ruler of Bologna; 1443–1445	Succeeded by Sante Bentivoglio
