= San Giacomo Maggiore, Bologna =

Church in Italy

Coordinates: 44°29′44.01″N 11°20′56.05″E

Basilica of San Giacomo Maggiore
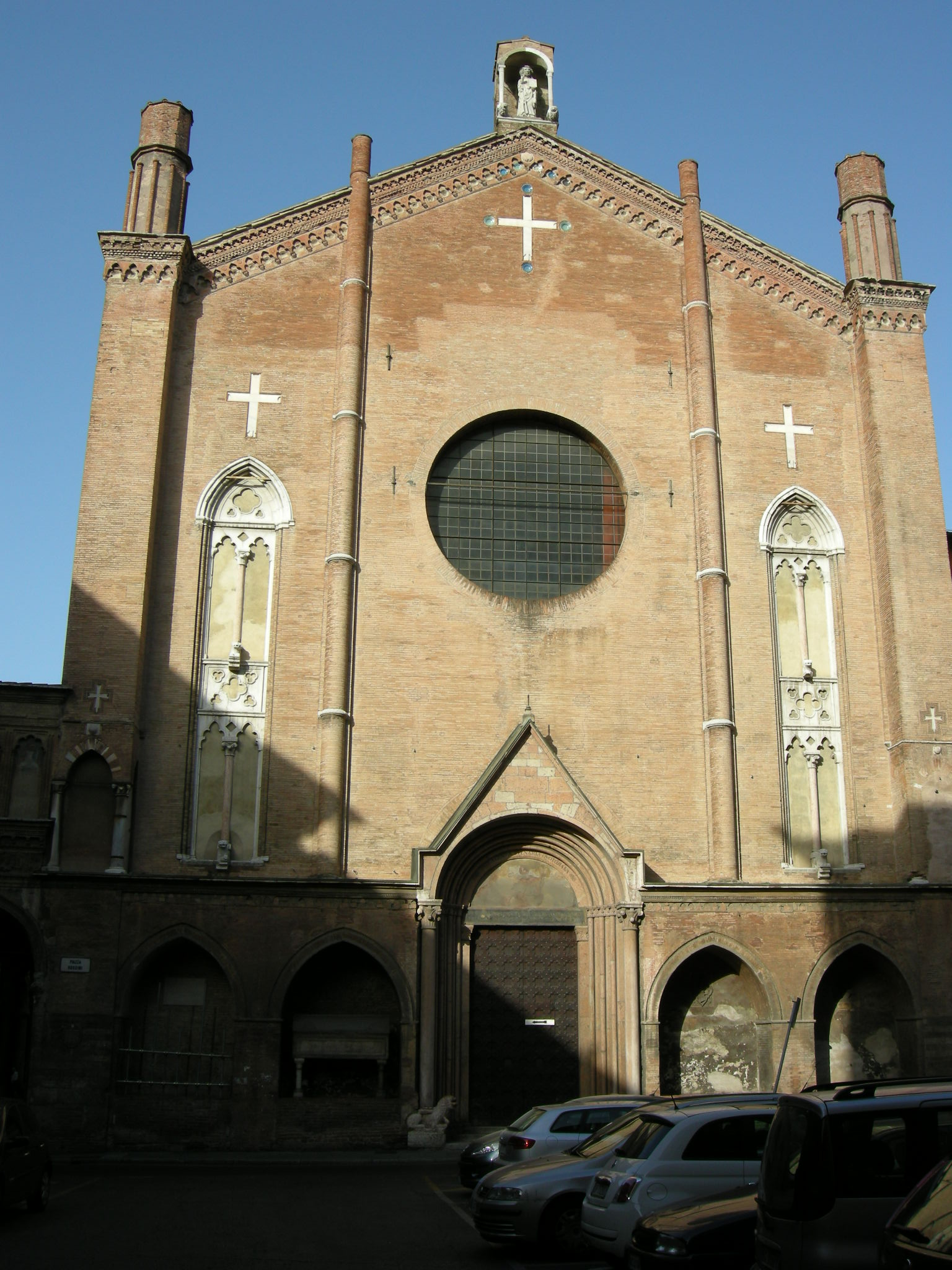

Religion
- Affiliation: Roman Catholic
- Province: Archdiocese of Bologna
- Ecclesiastical or organisational status: Minor basilica
- Leadership: The Rev. Father Domenico Vittorini, O.S.A.
- Year consecrated: 1344

Location
- Location: Via Zamboni 15, Bologna (BO), Italy
- Interactive map of Basilica of San Giacomo Maggiore

Architecture
- Style: Romanesque-Gothic
- Groundbreaking: 1267
- Completed: 1315
- Materials: Istrian stone

The Basilica of San Giacomo Maggiore is an historic Roman Catholic church in Bologna, region of Emilia Romagna, Italy, serving a monastery of Augustinian friars. It was built starting in 1267 and houses, among the rest, the Bentivoglio Chapel, featuring numerous Renaissance artworks.

== History ==
A community of hermits founded by the Blessed John the Good of Modena had established itself near the walls of Bologna, along the Savena river, as early as 1247. They founded a monastery with its church, dedicated to St. James the Greater (Italian: San Giacomo Maggiore). The hermits were merged in 1256 by the pope with other eremitical communities of the region to form the Order of Hermits of St. Augustine, with one of their number being elected the first Prior General of the new Order. As they then needed a larger religious complex within the walls, in 1267 construction was undertaken of the new church in the present location. The edifice was finished in 1315, but its consecration took place in 1344, with the completion of the apse section. The church, built in sober Romanesque style (with some Gothic elements such as the ogival windows), had a single nave with visible trusses and ended with a polygonal apse-chapel and two square chapel.

In the 15th century the Bentivoglio family built their family chapel in the church (1463–1468), and also added a long portico on the Via San Donato (1477–1481). Across the church is the flank of the 1560 Palazzo Malvezzi de' Medici in Bologna. In 1471 the bell tower was raised and, from 1483 to 1498, the interior was largely renovated with a new cover and a dome. New chapels were created in the side walls, which were eventually decorated with Renaissance and Baroque altars and paintings.

The Augustinian friars were expelled during the French occupation in the early 19th century. They returned in 1824, although part of the monastery remained a music school, now the Conservatorio Giovanni Battista Martini. With the anti-clerical laws again suppressing religious orders legislated by the new Kingdom of Italy, the friars gave up the monastery, keeping only possession of the church.

== Description ==
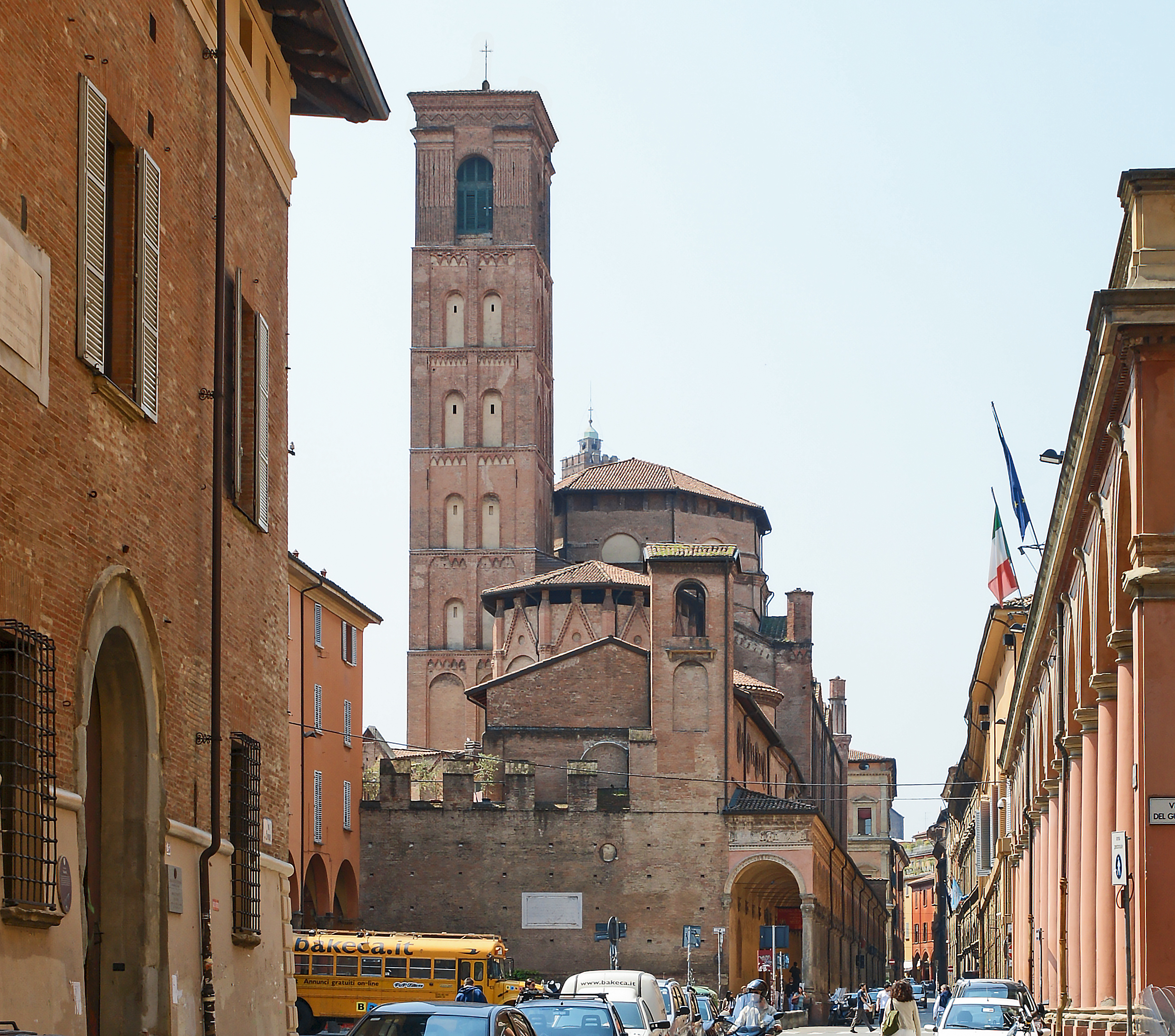
Apse and bell tower.

=== Exterior ===
The facade is the oldest part of the church, with its late-Romanesque proportions. The decorations in Istrian stone on the ogival windows, in Venetian style, were added by Lombardy masters in 1295. The four funerary cells were added in the early 14th century, shortly after those in the portico, which date to the 13th century and had frescoes (now inside the church); the original entrance protyrus was modified in the same period.

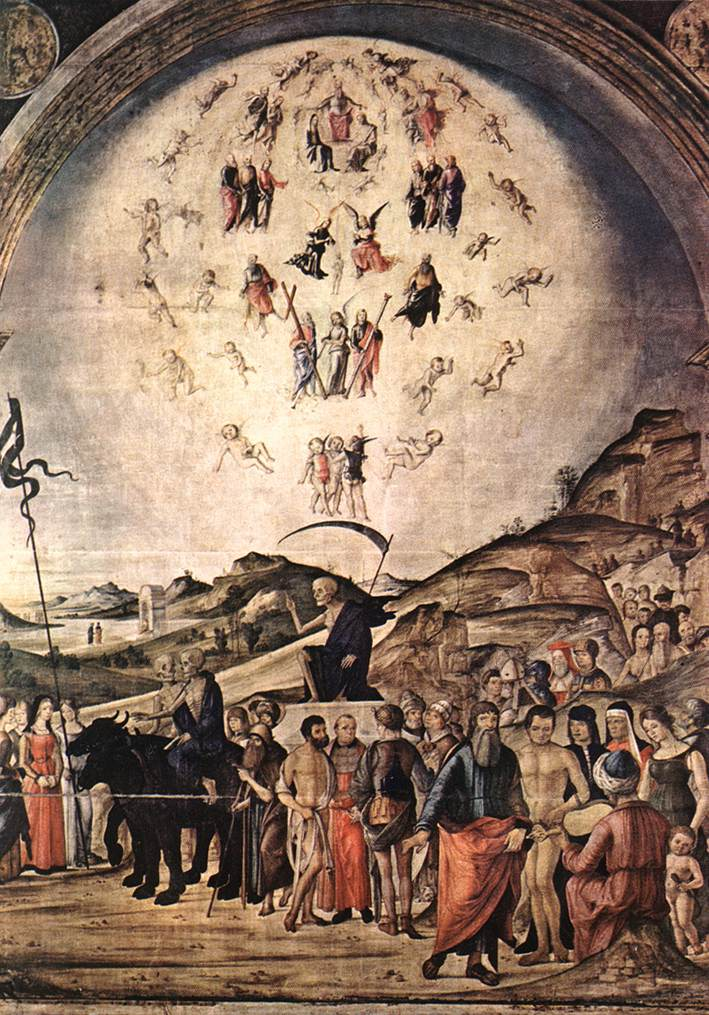
The Triumph over Death by Lorenzo Costa the Elder (1490).

The portico, traditionally attributed to Tommaso Filippi, had 36 Corinthian columns. The entablature has a frieze. The portico also gives access to two cloisters, one from the 15th and another the 16th century. The complex is bounded by the only surviving section of Bologna's 11th-century walls. Next to them is the Oratory of Santa Cecilia within the monastery cloister. The oratory includes frescoed panels by the Renaissance painters Francesco Francia, Lorenzo Costa, and Amico Aspertini. The 15th-century portico built by the Bentivoglio family and the bell tower.

The church has a Renaissance dome designed by Antonio Morandi.

=== Interior ===
The interior has Renaissance and Baroque decorations. The vaults have frescoes executed in 1495 by Francia and Lorenzo Costa's workshops. There are numerous chapels: the main ones include the Poggi Chapel, with artworks by Pellegrino Tibaldi, and the Bentivoglio Chapel.

==== Bentivoglio Chapel ====
This element of the basilica was designed by Pagno di Lapo Portigiani (1463–1468). It has a majolica pavement by the Della Robbia workshop (1498), with traces of the Bentivoglio coat of arms. The painted decoration was executed by Lorenzo Costa the Elder, and includes the Bentivoglio Altarpiece. The altarpiece is by Francesco Raibolini (c. 1494). The tomb of Anton Galeazzo Bentivoglio was sculpted by Jacopo della Quercia in 1438.

==== Poggi Chapel ====
This chapel was built by Cardinal Giovanni Poggi (1493–1556), a native of the city, who is buried in it. Poggi met Pellegrino Tibaldi, also a native of Bologna, after the painter had moved to Rome in 1547, and later commissioned him to paint the Palazzo Poggi in their hometown. Tibaldi returned to the city in 1555 and painted frescoes for the cardinal in both his palace and the family chapel. This work is considered Tibaldi's masterpiece. In this chapel there are two portraits by Tibaldi of the cardinal, one on each side of the altar. The one on the left shows him as papal nuncio to Spain, while the one on the right shows him later in his career, as a cardinal.

==== Other ====
Other artworks include Polyptych of the Holy Cross Relic by Paolo Veneziano, a Virgin in Glory by Bartolomeo Cesi (late 16th century), and an early 15th-century late Gothic crucifix in the Malvezzi Chapel.
