= Giovanni II Bentivoglio =

Italian nobleman (1443–1508)

Portrait of Giovanni II Bentivoglio, c. 1480, by Ercole de' Roberti.

Giovanni II Bentivoglio (12 February 1443 – 15 February 1508) was an Italian nobleman who was the de-facto ruler of Bologna from 1463 until 1506. He had no formal position, but held power as the city's "first citizen." The Bentivoglio family ruled over Bologna from 1443, and repeatedly attempted to consolidate their hold of the Signoria of the city.

== Background ==
Born in Bologna, Giovanni II was the son of Annibale I Bentivoglio, then chief magistrate of the commune, and Donnina Visconti. He was a child when his father was murdered by his rival Battista Canneschi in June 1445.

Annibale I was succeeded in Bologna by Sante I, of uncertain paternity and origin, but alleged to be a son of Ercole Bentivoglio, a cousin of Annibale I. Originally an apprentice of the wool guild of Florence, Sante ruled as signore of Bologna from 1443. When Sante died in 1463, Giovanni II Bentivoglio successfully made himself lord of the commune, although it was nominally a fief of the church under a papal legate. On 2 May 1464 he married Sante's widow Ginevra Sforza. In 1464 he obtained by Pope Paul II the privilege to be considered perpetual head of the city's Senate.

Machiavelli writes that Annibale, "having been murdered by the Canneschi, who had conspired against him, not one of his family survived but Messer Giovanni, who was in childhood: immediately after his assassination the people rose and murdered all the Canneschi. This sprung from the popular goodwill which the house of Bentivoglio enjoyed in those days in Bologna; which was so great that, although none remained there after the death of Annibale who were able to rule the state, the Bolognese, having information that there was one of the Bentivoglio family in Florence, who up to that time had been considered the son of a blacksmith [Sante], sent to Florence for him and gave him the government of their city, and it was ruled by him until Messer Giovanni came in due course to the government." (The Prince, Chapter XIX)

== Ruler of Bologna ==
In order to secure the support of the other powerful families of Italy, Giovanni fought personally as condottiero. In 1467 he was at the service of Florence, Milan and Naples against Bartolomeo Colleoni, and in 1471 again for Milan, but his first military deeds occurred only in 1477 when he besieged Faenza for the Sforza. In 1482, during the War of Ferrara, he helped Ercole d'Este against Pope Sixtus IV and Venice. He later fought in small struggles for the Kingdom of Naples, but his personal interventions were always limited by the Bolognese institutions.

In 1488, his daughter Francesca poisoned her own husband, Galeotto Manfredi, ruler of Faenza. The latter's citizens considered the feat as an occult move to conquer the city, and rebelled. When Giovanni reached the city to suppress the revolt, he was captured. He was freed only through the intercession of Lorenzo de' Medici. In the same year he was made Capitano Generale (Chief of Staff) of the Milanese army, but this was an almost honorific position as Giovanni left the command duties to his sons. In 1488 Giovanni had also to crush a plot against him, led by the Malvezzi family, whose members were almost all hanged or exiled. In 1501, the same fate struck the Marescottis.

Bentivoglio had managed to resist the expansionist designs of Cesare Borgia, but on 7 October 1506 Pope Julius II issued a bull deposing and excommunicating Bentivoglio and placing the city under interdict. When the papal troops, along with a contingent sent by Louis XII of France, marched against Bologna, Bentivoglio and his family fled. Julius II entered the city triumphantly on 10 November.

Giovanni moved first to Busseto, host of the Pallavicini family. An attempt led by his sons Annibale II and Ermes to reconquer Bologna in 1507 failed. The Bolognese subsequently rioted against his possessions in the city, destroying the palace.

Excommunicated, Giovanni ended his days as prisoner of Louis XII in Milan. He died in 1508 in the Castello Sforzesco of that city.

Giovanni Bentivoglio is said to have consulted in 1504 the famous astrologer Luca Gaurico about his and his sons' destiny. Displeased with Gaurico's negative prophecy, Bentivoglio subjected him to the torture of mancuerda, and exiled him from Bologna.

== Overview ==
Giovanni II Bentivoglio ruled with a stern sway for nearly half a century, maintaining a splendid court and beautifying Bologna, in particular developing its waterways. The misery of the city's poor, however, stood in stark contrast to the splendor of the city and its festivities.

Among the projects he commissioned were the frescoes depicting the life of Saint Cecilia in the Oratorio di Santa Cecilia through the archway of San Giacomo. These frescoes were painted by artists living in the city at the time: Francesco Francia, Lorenzo Costa the Elder and Amico Aspertini. Lorenzo Costa's Bentivoglio Altarpiece, housed in the Bentivoglio Chapel in the church of San Giacomo Maggiore, was commissioned by Giovanni Bentivoglio as a votive offering of thanks for the family's escape from an attempted massacre by the Malvezzi family. Bentivoglio also ordered the Palazzo Bentivoglio (City Hall) to be built by the architect G. Nadi, starting in 1498. The Bolognese architect Aristotile Fioravanti, who later settled in Russia, created the plans for the reconstruction of the Palazzo del Podestà, but the reconstruction was not carried out by Bentivoglio until 1484–1494.

== Family and descendants ==
On 2 May 1464 Giovanni married Ginevra Sforza (1440–1507), the illegitimate daughter of Alessandro Sforza, Lord of Pesaro and the widow of his cousin and predecessor, Sante Bentivoglio. There was probably a relationship between them before their marriage. She was, among other things, his counselor. Ginevra gave her husband sixteen children, of whom five died in infancy. The others were:

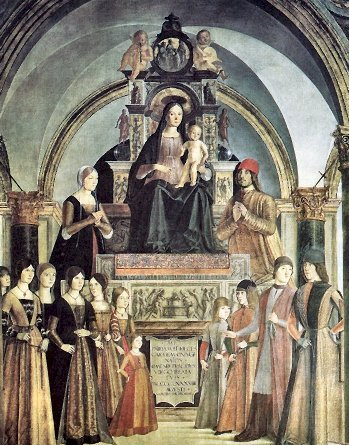
Bentivoglio family by Lorenzo Costa.

- Annibale II Bentivoglio (1469–1540) who married Lucrezia, daughter of Ercole I d'Este, and who was lord of Bologna from 1511 to 1512;
- Ermes Bentivoglio (1475–1513)
- Alessandro Bentivoglio (1474–1532), who married Ippolita Sforza;
- Camilla, a nun at Corpus Christi
- Isotta, a nun at Corpus Christi
- Francesca, married to Galeotto Manfredi
- Antongaleazzo Bentivoglio, prelate
- Eleonora
- Laura, wife of Giovanni Gonzaga
- Violante, wife of Pandolfo IV Malatesta
- Bianca.

Giovanni also had another daughter (whether illegitimate or not, it is unknown), Camilla Bentivoglio, whose mother is said to be a 'Lucrezia D'Este'. Whether this 'Lucrezia' was the same as his daughter-in-law, daughter of Ercole I d'Este, is a matter of speculation. Camilla went on to marry Pirro Gonzaga, a scion of the House of Gonzaga (a male line grandson of Ludovico III Gonzaga, Marquis of Mantua). It is unknown how many children she had, but 3 of them are known:

- Isabel Gonzaga, who married Rodolfo Gonzaga, her cousin and, like her, a great-grandchild of Ludovico III Gonzaga
- Carlos Gonzaga
- Lucrezia Gonzaga, a pupil of Matteo Bandello

Through Isabel and Carlos, Camilla and her father Giovanni are ancestors of Henri, Grand Duke of Luxembourg and his first cousin, King Philippe of Belgium.

== Sources ==
- Ady, Cecilia M. (1937). The Bentivoglio of Bologna: A Study in Despotism. London: Oxford University Press.
- "Ginevra e Gentile". Accademia Culturale "Castelli in Aria" (in Italian). Archived from the original on 30 May 2012.
- Clarke, Georgia (1999). "Magnificence and the City: Giovanni II Bentivoglio and Architecture in Fifteenth-Century Bologna". Renaissance Studies. 13 (4): 397–411. doi:10.1111/j.1477-4658.1999.tb00087.x.
- Rendina, Claudio (1998). I capitani di ventura. Rome: Newton Compton.
- Samoggia, Sandro (2013). "Giovanni II, il Principe di Bologna". Mia Bologna.
