= Antongaleazzo Bentivoglio =

15th-century Italian military leader of the Papal States

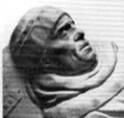
Anton Galeazzo Bentivoglio

Antongaleazzo Bentivoglio (c. 1385–1435) was an Italian condottiero who was executed by the Papal States for treason.

== Life ==
The son of Giovanni I Bentivoglio, after the murder of his father, Antongaleazzo studied law and was a leader of the republican opposition in Bologna against the authority of the Antipope John XXIII (1416–1420). He treated with the famous condottiero Braccio da Montone when the latter was sent to occupy the city; in 1420, he seized the effective lordship of Bologna but had soon to cede it to the newly elected Pope Martin V, in exchange for the Castel Bolognese. Antongaleazzo then lived as a condottiero, though without notable deeds.

Exiled from his city despite his position as Papal commander, Bentivoglio was finally able to return in Bologna on 4 December 1435 at the head of a large number of exiles. However, his presence raised the suspicions of the papal legate Daniele da Treviso, who had him taken prisoner and beheaded. His remains were interred in the Bentivoglio Chapel of the Basilica of San Giacomo Maggiore.
