= Annibale II Bentivoglio =

Italian condottiero (1467–1540)

Annibale II Bentivoglio (1467 – June 1540) was an Italian condottiero, who was shortly lord of Bologna in 1511 and 1512. He was the last member of his family to hold power in the city. He was the son of Giovanni II Bentivoglio.

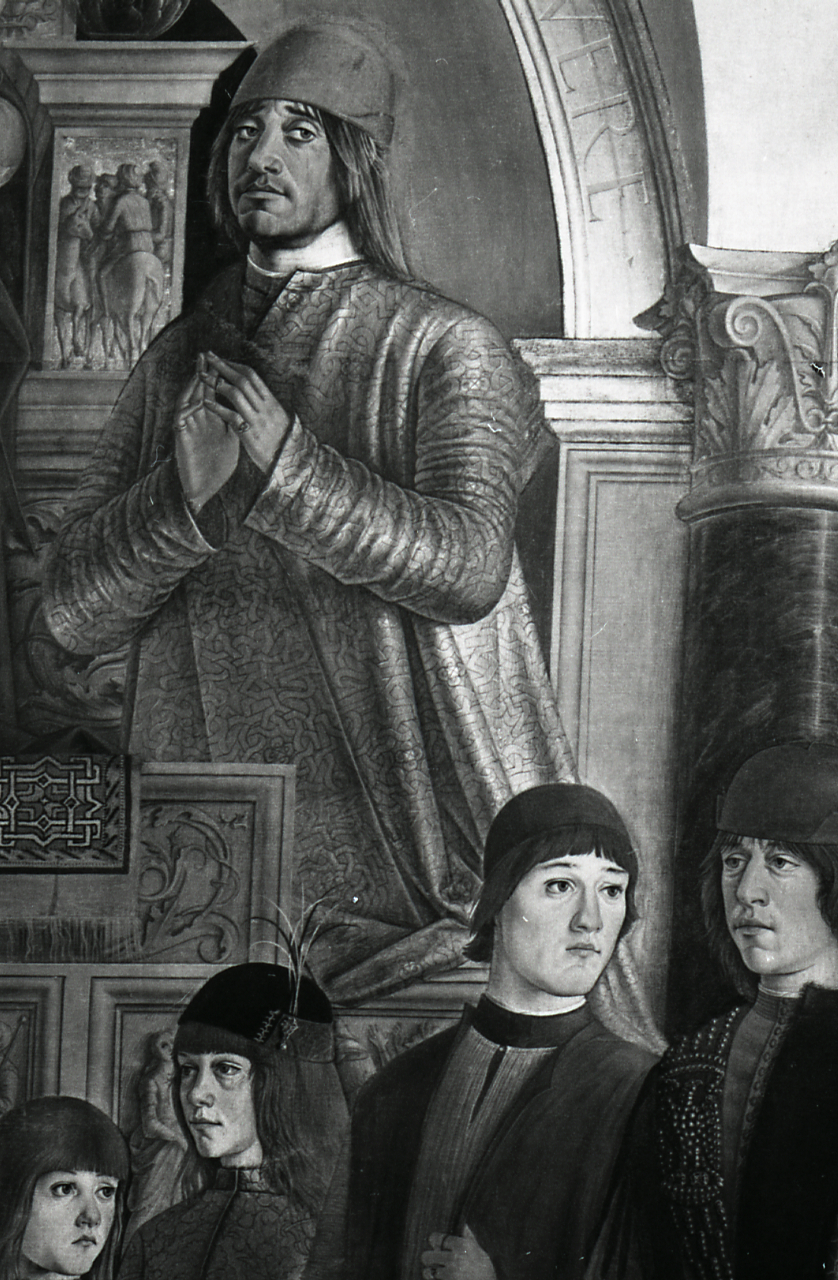
Bentivoglio Altarpiece by Lorenzo Costa, detail with the portrait of Annibale II Bentivoglio.

In 1487, he married Lucrezia d'Este. He served Florence and fought against the French invasion of Charles VIII in 1494. In 1500, in a changing of side ordered by his father, he paid 50,000 ducats to Gian Giacomo Trivulzio, French plenipotentiary in Milan, to save his city from any attack.

In 1506, Giovanni II was ousted from Bologna. Annibale and his brother Ermes remained in the city in order to favour the family's return, but in vain. In 1511, thanks to Trivulzio's intercession, he managed to return as ruler. But he was able to maintain his position only until June 10, 1512, after the French defeat at Ravenna.

He took refuge in Ferrara, where he died in 1540. He is portrayed in Lorenzo Costa the Elder's Bentivoglio Altarpiece, commissioned by his father in 1488.

== Footnotes ==
| Preceded by To the Papal States | Ruler of Bologna; 1511–1512 | Succeeded by To the Papal States |
