= 17th century in Wales =

- 16th century | 1700s | Other years in Wales
- Other events of the century

This article is about the particular significance of the century 1601–1700 to Wales and its people.

== Events ==
1601

- June – John Salusbury is knighted by Queen Elizabeth I of England for his assistance in suppressing the Essex Rebellion.
- October
  - The "Wrexham riot" occurs, when supporters of Sir John Salusbury are involved in violent clashes with surviving Essex supporters led by Sir Richard Trevor.
  - William Morgan, Bishop of Llandaff, becomes Bishop of St Asaph.
- 22 November – Francis Godwin is consecrated the new Bishop of Llandaff.
- December – Sir John Salusbury becomes MP for Denbighshire.
- date unknown – James Price (of Pilleth) becomes High Sheriff of Radnorshire for the first time.

1602

- 7 July – Sir Richard Bulkeley is appointed to the Council of Wales and the Marches.
- 17 July – The Lord Lieutenancy of Monmouthshire is separated from that of Wales and is held by Edward Somerset, 4th Earl of Worcester.
- Sir Edmund Morgan (of Llandaff) is High Sheriff of Monmouthshire.

1603

- 24 March – Henry Frederick, son of King James I of England, is invested as Duke of Cornwall upon his father's accession.
- date unknown – David Hughes founds Beaumaris Grammar School.

1604

- 27 February – Roger Brereton of Borras becomes MP for Flint.
- Carmarthen is made a county corporate by charter of King James I of England.
- Thomas Myddelton becomes Sheriff of London.
- John Davies becomes rector of Mallwyd.
- Sir Richard Bulkeley is elected MP for Anglesey.

1605

- January – Catholic plotter Thomas Morgan (of Llantarnam) is condemned to death for his part in a conspiracy involving Catherine Henriette de Balzac d'Entragues, but the sentence is not carried out.
- 8 March – Sir Eubule Thelwall is appointed steward and recorder of Ruthin for life.
- The earldom of Montgomery is created for Philip Herbert, a favourite of King James I of England.

1606

- 12 April – A new Union Flag is created by royal decree to mark the union between England and Scotland; Wales is not represented in the design.
- 31 October – John Griffith, later MP for Beaumaris, matriculates at Brasenose College, Oxford, aged 15.
- date unknown
  - Hawarden High School is founded as a single-classroom grammar school with £300 left by local resident George Ledsham.
  - William Spurstow, MP, is instrumental in the passing of a bill to relieve Welsh cloth from the need to have a seal of content.
  - A storm buries the village of St Ismail near modern-day Kidwelly, Carmarthenshire.
  - John Wynn, eldest son of Sir John Wynn, 1st Baronet, marries Eleanor Cave.

1607

- 30 January – Bristol Channel floods cause devastation on the Welsh coast, from Laugharne in Carmarthenshire to above Chepstow in Monmouthshire. Cardiff was the most badly affected town, with the foundations of St Mary's Church destroyed.
- 26 March – Peter Mutton is granted the reversion of the office of Attorney General in Wales and Shropshire, Herefordshire, Gloucestershire, Worcestershire, Cheshire, and Flintshire for life.
- 11 May – Marriage of Blanche Somerset, daughter of the Earl of Worcester, and Thomas Arundell, 2nd Baron Arundell of Wardour.
- date unknown
  - Serious outbreak of plague in Conwy.
  - Walter Jones, of a family of Welsh wool merchants, begins the construction of Chastleton House in Oxfordshire.

1608

- 7 November – Charles Vaughan (of Porthamal) is knighted.
- 26 November – Peter Wynne, a member of Captain Christopher Newport's exploration party to the villages of the Monacan above the falls of the James River in Virginia, writes to John Egerton, 1st Earl of Bridgewater, informing him that some members of Newport's party believe the pronunciation of the Monacans' language resembles "Welch", and have asked Wynne to act as interpreter.
- Richard Wynn, the future 2nd Baronet, enters the service of the Lord Chamberlain in London.

1610

- 4 June – Henry Stuart is created Prince of Wales and Earl of Chester.
- date unknown
  - Plas Teg is built by Sir John Trevor near the village of Pontblyddyn, Flintshire.
  - The Old Church of St Gwenllwyfo, Llanwenllwyfo, undergoes restoration work, as shown by the date of the oak screen and pulpit.
  - Ewenny Pottery started.
  - Approximate date of Kennixton Farmhouse, now located at St Fagans National History Museum near Cardiff.

1611

- 29 June – Creation of the Wynn Baronetcy for Sir John Wynn.
- John Jones of Gellilyfdy is placed in a debtors' prison in London.

1612

- Sir Thomas Button winters at the mouth of the Nelson River in Canada, naming it after the ship's sailing master, who had died.

1613

- 29 September – Official opening of the New River, supplying London with fresh water. Sir Hugh Myddelton, who has been instrumental in its creation, is the brother of Sir Thomas Myddelton, Lord Mayor of London in the same year.

1614

- 26 December – The will of haberdasher William Jones leaves "nyne thousand pounds to the Company of Haberdashers of London to ordain a Preacher, a Free School and Alms houses for twenty poor and distressed people, as blind and lame as it shall seem best to them, of the Town of Monmouth, where it shall be bestowed". Monmouth School and the Monmouth Alms Houses are among the establishments founded as a result.
- Beaumaris Courthouse built.
- Marmaduke Lloyd becomes King's Attorney for the Marches and is appointed to the Council of Wales and the Marches.

1615

- Wye Bridge, Monmouth, is rebuilt in stone.

1616

- November – Charles Stuart is created Prince of Wales and Earl of Chester, four years after the death of his elder brother.
- Thomas Gerard, 1st Baron Gerard, is appointed President of the Council of Wales and the Marches, replacing Ralph Eure, 3rd Baron Eure.

1617

- William Compton, 1st Earl of Northampton, becomes President of the Council of Wales and the Marches.
- Sir Richard Wynn, 2nd Baronet, becomes Groom of the Bedchamber to Charles, Prince of Wales, retaining the position until the prince becomes King Charles I in 1625.
- Richard Whitbourne is recruited by William Vaughan to govern his new colony of Cambriol.

1618

- John Griffith is appointed High Sheriff of Caernarvonshire. Sir John Wynn, 1st Baronet, becomes Custos Rotulorum of Caernarvonshire.

1619

- Mostyn Colliery is recorded as being worth approximately £700 annually to the Mostyn family, which suggests a fairly substantial output.

1620

- Bishop William Morgan's Bible translation into Welsh is revised by Bishop Richard Parry and John Davies (Mallwyd) as Y Bibl Cyssegr-lan, published in London.

1621

- New MPs include Lewis Powell, William Herbert, Henry Vaughan and John Trevor.

1622

- William Vaughan arrives in Cambriol to begin a stay of three years, during which he writes The Golden Fleece.

1623

- Sir Richard Wynn, 2nd Baronet, is one of the party accompanying the Prince of Wales to Spain. His account of the journey was published a century later.

1625

- 8 July – A deputation including Sir Sackville Trevor takes a petition to King Charles I.

1627

- June – Sir Sackville Trevor serves with distinction in the expedition to La Rochelle led by George Villiers, 1st Duke of Buckingham.
- September – Sir Sackville Trevor leads a flotilla that blockaded the mouth of the Elbe in support of the land force sent under Sir Charles Morgan to assist King Christian IV of Denmark.

1636

- The three-arch stone bridge, Pont Fawr, at Llanrwst is built by Sir John Wynn of Gwydir Castle; its design is attributed to Inigo Jones.

1638

- Bont Fawr at Dolgellau built.

1639

- Abergavenny receives its charter of incorporation.

1640

- date unknown – Godfrey Goodman, Bishop of Gloucester, is imprisoned for 5 weeks for refusing to sign the oath known as the Laudian canons.

1643

- September – Vavasor Powell leads a march of eighty men to Machynlleth.
- 9 November – Thomas Myddelton takes Farndon Bridge at Holt on behalf of Parliament.

1644

- January – Thomas Fairfax breaks the six-week siege of Nantwich.
- September – The first battle of the English Civil War on Welsh soil takes place at Montgomery.
- Thomas Bulkeley is created 1st Viscount Bulkeley in recognition of his service to the Royalist cause in the English Civil War.
- Roch Castle is captured by Parliament; the owner's daughter, Lucy Walter, flees to London and thence to The Hague.

1645

- 4 February – Jeremy Taylor is among the Royalist prisoners taken during the siege of Cardigan Castle.
- June – King Charles I of England begins a tour of South Wales, in the wake of his defeat at the Battle of Naseby, to rally support.
- 16 July – King Charles I dines with the Morgans at Tredegar Park.
- 25 July – King Charles I is entertained by the Morgans of Ruperra Castle.
- 5 August – King Charles I visits Colonel Edward Prichard at Llancaiach Fawr.
- September – King Charles I visits Denbigh.

1646

- 19 August – Raglan Castle surrenders to Parliamentary forces.
- October – Colonel William Salusbury surrenders Denbigh Castle to Parliamentary forces, with the king's written permission.
- Barrister William Philipps buys the island of Skokholm for £300.

1647

- 19 January – Holt Castle surrenders to Parliamentary forces after an 11-month siege.
- 16 March – Harlech Castle surrenders to Parliamentary forces, the last Royalist stronghold of the English Civil War on mainland Britain.

1648

- 8 May – Battle of St. Fagans
- August – Katherine Fowler ("Orinda") marries James Philips of Cardigan Priory.

1649

- 29 January – Thomas Wogan and John Jones Maesygarnedd are among the signatories to the death warrant of King Charles I.
- April – Rowland Laugharne, John Poyer and Rice Powell, former Parliamentary commanders, are condemned to death for their role in the rebellion leading to the Battle of St Fagans. They draw lots and the sentence is carried out only on Colonel Poyer.
- 9 April – Lucy Walter, mistress of the Prince of Wales, gives birth to the future Duke of Monmouth.
- unknown date – Aberystwyth Castle slighted by Commonwealth troops.

1650

- 22 February – The Act for the better propagation and preaching of the Gospel in Wales is passed by Parliament, resulting in the ejection of dissident clergymen and creating English-language schools.

1656

- date unknown – Colonel Philip Jones buys Fonmon Castle from the St John family.

1657

- George Fox visits Dolgellau, resulting in the foundation of a local Quaker community, led by Rowland Ellis.
- Jenkin Jones becomes minister at Llanddetty.

1659

- 5 August – Booth's Rebellion proclaims Charles II as King. Its leaders include Thomas Myddelton of Chirk Castle.
- 19 August – Booth's forces take Chester.

1660

- 23 July – Creation of the Aubrey baronets of Llantrithead
- 17 October – Hugh Lloyd becomes Bishop of Llandaff.
- William Philipps is elected MP for Haverfordwest.
- At about this date, Elizabeth Cromwell (widow of Oliver) retires to Wales.

1661

- 20 April – Royalist Arthur Annesley is created Earl of Anglesey.
- Bridge at Carrog built over Dee.

1662

- Henry Walter and Charles Edwards are among the ministers ejected as a result of the Act of Uniformity.

1663

- Baptist leader John Myles takes the Ilston Book with him when he and his whole congregation emigrate to North America, where they found the First Baptist Church in Swansea.
- Bangor Bridge built at Bangor-on-Dee.

1664

- Thomas Wogan, former Parliamentary commander and regicide, escapes from York Castle and flees to the Netherlands.

1666

- Last recorded news of Thomas Wogan, resident in Utrecht and plotting against King Charles II.

1667

- Francis Davies becomes Bishop of Llandaff.

1668

- Rhydwilym Baptist Chapel in Llangolman is founded.

1669

- Henry Morgan lands on Île-à-Vache and begins using it as the base for his piracy.

1673

- 17 June – Land for a Friends meeting house at The Pales in Powys is acquired; by the early 21st century it will be Wales's oldest in continuous use.

1678

- The gardens of Bodysgallen Hall are laid out.
- 17 November – During the Popish Plot John Arnold of Monmouthshire captures Jesuit priest David Lewis at St Michael's Church, Llantarnam.

1679

- 27 August – Jesuit priest David Lewis (b. 1616) is hanged at Usk for high treason. He will be canonized in 1970.

1680

- 9 September – Regicide Henry Marten dies a prisoner in Chepstow Castle.

1681

- 12 September – Great fire at Presteigne.

1682

- 30 August – A group of Welsh settlers, including Thomas Wynne, set sail for Pennsylvania. Settlement of Bala Cynwyd begins.
- 14 September – Bishop Gore School is founded in Swansea by Bishop Hugh Gore.

1686

- Rowland Ellis and his fellow Quakers leave Wales for Pennsylvania to avoid religious persecution.

1688

- 10 December – Mary of Modena, queen consort of King James II of England, flees to France, taking with her the six-month-old James Francis Edward Stuart, Prince of Wales.
- The chief officers of the corporation of Abergavenny refuse to take the oath of allegiance to King William III, and the town's charter is annulled.

1689

- 25 July – Council of Wales and the Marches is abolished.

1690

- 27 December – great fire at Builth.
- date unknown
  - Blast furnace at Coed Ithel.
  - Jenkin Lewis is appointed personal servant to Prince William, Duke of Gloucester, second in line to the throne.

1694

- 7 January – Following the death of the incumbent, Charles Gerard, 1st Earl of Macclesfield, the Lord Lieutenancy of Wales is divided between North and South Wales.

1695

- 7 March – Sir John Trevor, Speaker of the House of Commons, is found guilty of taking a bribe and expelled from the Commons.

1697

- Pont Cysylltau built.

1699

- Bryn Celli Ddu is plundered by grave robbers.
- American-born East India merchant Elihu Yale returns to his family home at Plas Grono near Wrexham where he spends much of the rest of his life.

1700

- Quaker emigrant Rowland Ellis is elected to represent Philadelphia in the provincial assembly.

== Arts and literature ==
=== Books ===
1600

- Robert Holland – Darmerth, neu Arlwy i Weddi
- William Vaughan – Golden Grove

1603

- John Davies of Hereford – Microcosmos
- 'P.G.' – A most strange and true report of a monstrous fish, who appeared in the forme of a woman, from her waste upwards
- Wiliam Midleton – Psalmae y brenhinol brophwyd Dafydh
- George Owen of Henllys – The Description of Pembrokeshire

1611

- Lewis Bayly – Practice of Piety

1613

- Lewis Dwnn – Heraldic Visitations of the Three Counties of North Wales above Conway

1615

- "R.A., Gent." (Robert Anton, Robert Aylett or Robert Armin?) – The Valiant Welshman, or the true Chronicle History of the Life and Valiant Deedes of Caradoc the Great, King of Cambria, now called Wales. As it hath beene sundry times acted by the Prince of Wales his Servants

1616

- Rhosier Smyth – Gorsedd y Byd

1618

- Ben Jonson – For the Honour of Wales (masque, first performed 17 February)

1621

- Edmwnd Prys – Salmau Cân

1630

- Rowland Vaughan – 'Yr Ymarfer o Dduwioldeb

1632

- John Davies (Mallwyd) – Dictionarium duplex

1636

- Sir Thomas Salusbury, 2nd Baronet – The History of Joseph

1645

- James Howell – Epistolae Ho-Elianae, vol. 1

1650

- James Howell – Epistolae Ho-Elianae, vol. 3
- Henry Vaughan – Silex scintillans, part 1

1651

- Henry Vaughan – Olor Iscanus

1652

- Henry Vaughan – The Mount of Olives

1653

- William Erbery – A Mad Mans Plea
- Morgan Llwyd – Llyfr y Tri Aderyn

1654

- Alexander Griffith
  - Strena Vavasoriensis; or, a New Year's Gift for the Welsh Itinerants. Or an Hue and Cry after Mr. Vavasor Powell, Metropolitan of the Itinerants, and one of the Executioners of the Gospel by Colour of the late Act for the Propagation thereof in Wales
  - True and Perfect Relation of the whole Transaction concerning the Petition of the Six Counties of South Wales, and the County of Monmouth

1655

- Jeremy Taylor – Golden Grove; or a Manuall of daily prayers and letanies . .

1656

- Morgan Llwyd – Gair o'r Gair

1657

- Morgan Llwyd – Yr Ymroddiad

1658

- Rowland Vaughan – Yr Arfer o Weddi yr Arglwydd

1660

- Rowland Vaughan – Evchologia: neu Yr Athrawiaeth i arferol weddio

1678

- Henry Vaughan – Thalia Rediviva

1688

- Y Gymraeg yn ei Disgleirdeb

== Births ==
1601

- James Lewis, MP for Cardiganshire

1602

- date unknown – Sir John Glynne, judge (d. 1666)
- probable – Henry Wynn, MP for Merioneth (d. 1671)

1603

- date unknown – Richard Jones, Anglican priest and writer (d. c.1655)

1604

- 4 May – Sir Hugh Owen, 1st Baronet, politician (d. 1670)
- date unknown
  - William Erbery, theologian (d. 1654)
  - Thomas Hughes, politician (d. 1664)
  - Sir Thomas Morgan, 1st Baronet, soldier (d. 1679)
- probable – Richard Herbert, 2nd Baron Herbert of Chirbury, Royalist soldier and politician (d. 1655)

1605

- 14 March – Francis Davies, Bishop of Llandaff (d. 1675)
- date unknown – Herbert Price, politician (d. 1678)
- probable – John Edwards (Siôn Treredyn), priest and translator (d. 1656)

1607

- date unknown – Kenrick Eyton, lawyer and politician (d. 1681)

1608

- date unknown – Robert Morgan, Bishop of Bangor (d. 1673)
- probable
  - Arthur Owen, politician (d. 1678)
  - Thomas Powell, priest and writer (d. 1660)

1610

- July/August – Humphrey Lloyd, Bishop of Bangor (d. 1689)
- date unknown
  - William Foxwist, judge and politician (d. c. 1673)
  - Robert Pugh, Jesuit priest and controversialist (d. 1679)

1611

- date unknown – Henry Walter, Puritan priest (d. c. 1678)

1613

- 2 February – William Thomas, Bishop of St David's (d. 1689)
- date unknown – Henry Vaughan the younger, MP (d. 1676)

1615

- date unknown – Jonathan Edwards, priest and brother-in-law of John Jones Maesygarnedd (d. 1681)

1617

- date unknown – Vavasor Powell, religious writer (d. 1670)
- probable – George Probert, AS (m. 1677)

1619

- date unknown
  - Morgan Llwyd, writer (d. 1659)
  - William Price, Royalist colonel (d. 1691)

1620

- approx. date – William Maurice, antiquary (d. 1680)

1621

- 17 April
  - Henry Vaughan, poet (d. 1695)
  - Thomas Vaughan, philosopher (d. 1666)

1627

- 20 July – Thomas Wynne, personal physician of William Penn (d. 1691)

c.1630

- Lucy Walter, mistress of Charles II of England (d. 1658)

1634

- date unknown – William Williams, politician (d. 1700)

1649

- 5 April – Elihu Yale, founder of Yale University (d. 1721)
- 9 April – James Scott, 1st Duke of Monmouth, son of the future King Charles II of England and Lucy Walter (d. 1685)

1655

- date unknown – Henry Rowlands, antiquary (d. 1723)

1671

- date unknown – Ellis Wynne, priest and author (d. 1734)

1674

- 18 October – Beau Nash, leader of fashion (d. 1762)

1675

- date unknown – William Jones, mathematician (d. 1749)

1677

- 16 July – Angharad James, poet (d. 1749)

1682

- 17 May – Bartholomew Roberts, pirate ("Black Bart") (d. 1722)

1683

- 1 March – Caroline of Ansbach, future Princess of Wales (d. 1737)
- 10 November – Prince George of Hanover, future Prince of Wales (d. 1760)

1684

- early – Griffith Jones, religious minister and educationalist (d. 1761)

1688

- 1 November – Morgan Morgan, American colonist

1693

- February – Theophilus Evans, historian (d. 1767)
- 6 April – Hugh Hughes, poet ("Y Bardd Coch o Fôn"; d. 1776)

1696

- date unknown – Marged ferch Ifan, harpist and wrestler (d. 1793)

1697

- date unknown – Thomas William, minister and writer (d. 1778)

1698

- 30 October (baptised) – Bridget Bevan, educationalist and public benefactor (d. 1779)

1699

- 15 May – Sampson Lloyd, Welsh-descended banker (d. 1779)
- 8 November – Sir Erasmus Philipps, 5th Baronet, of Picton Castle, politician (d. 1743)

1700

- 8 March – William Morgan the elder, of Tredegar, politician (d. 1731)
- date unknown – Guto Nyth Brân, legendary athlete (d. 1737)
- probable – Lewis Evans, surveyor (d. 1756)

== Deaths ==
1601

- 19 January – Henry Herbert, 2nd Earl of Pembroke, Lord President of Wales, about 63
- 13 March – Sir Gelli Meyrick, executed for his part in Essex's rebellion, about 45
- 17 June – Gabriel Goodman, Dean of Westminster, 72
- 17 October – Hugh Lloyd, head of Winchester College, 54/5
- date unknown – Owen Holland, MP for Anglesey

1602

- 3 April – Siôn Tudur, Welsh language poet, about 80
- 3 June – Francis Bevans, Principal of Jesus College, Oxford, 71/72
- after May – John Price, politician

1603

- date unknown
  - Thomas Floyd, writer
  - Philip Jones, politician
  - Matthew Herbert, Monmouthshire landowner and politician
  - Thomas Morgan, politician
- probable – Richard Herbert, politician

1604

- 6 January – Henry Williams (alias Cromwell), knight of Welsh descent, 66/7
- 10 September – Bishop William Morgan, Bible translator, 59
- date unknown – Meredith Hanmer, controversialist, historian, and translator, about 60

1606

- date unknown
  - John Lloyd, MP for Denbighshire, mid-50s
  - Simwnt Fychan, poet, c. 75
  - Thomas Morgan (of Llantarnam), Catholic spy

1607

- 19 January – Anne Morgan, Baroness Hunsdon, 77/8
- 30 March – Richard Vaughan, Bishop of London, about 57
- date unknown – Thomas Lewis (of Harpton), politician

1609

- 26 March – John Dee, mathematician and occultist
- 15 May – Sir Edward Stradling, politician, antiquary and literary patron, c. 80
- July – Hugh Hughes, politician
- date unknown
  - John Griffith (of Cefnamlwch), politician
  - Twm Siôn Cati, outlaw, about 77
- probable – Siôn Dafydd Rhys, physician and grammarian, about 75.

1610

- 17 May – Gervase Babington, Bishop of Llandaff 1591–94
- 10 December – John Roberts, Catholic martyr (executed)
- probable – Edward James, priest and translator

1611

- date unknown
  - Henry Adams, MP for Pembroke
  - Gabriel Powell, Anglican priest

1612

- 24 July – Sir John Salusbury, poet and politician, 45
- 6 November – Henry Frederick, Prince of Wales, 18
- date unknown – Robert Parry, poet, romancier and translator

1613

- 26 August – George Owen of Henllys, antiquary, 61
- 4 September – John Williams, principal of Jesus College, Oxford
- date unknown – Owen ap Hugh, MP for Newborough

1615

- January – William Jones, haberdasher and philanthropist, c.65
- 12 April – William Lower, astronomer, 45
- date unknown – George Lloyd, Bishop of Chester

1616

- 30 May – Sir Thomas Parry, diplomat, 75
- 6 July – Henry Rowlands, Bishop of Bangor, 64/5

1617

- date unknown – Henry Perry, linguistic scholar and priest

1618

- July – John Davies of Hereford, poet, 53
- 13 December – Roger Puleston, politician, 53

1620

- June – Griffith Powell, principal of Jesus College, Oxford, 58/9

1621

- 24 May – Barbara Sidney, Countess of Leicester, 57
- 28 June – Sir Richard Bulkeley, politician, 88

1622

- date unknown – John Owen, epigrammatist

1626

- 10 December – Edmund Gunter, mathematician

1627

- 1 March – Sir John Wynn, 1st Baronet

1629

- 27 March – Sir John Philipps, 1st Baronet

1630

- 8 October – Sir Eubule Thelwall, lawyer, academic and politician

1631

- 10 December – Sir Hugh Myddelton, goldsmith and hydraulic engineer

1633

- probable – Sir Sackville Trevor, sea captain

1634

- April – Sir Thomas Button, explorer and admiral
- 23 August (buried) – Tomos Prys, poet

1636

- date unknown – John Lougher, MP for Pembroke

1641

- 9 August – Augustine Baker, Benedictine mystic and ascetic writer, 65 (dies of bubonic plague in London)
- August – William Vaughan, writer and colonist

1644

- December – Rhys Prichard ("Yr Hen Ficer"), 65

1646

- 30 June – Philip Powell, Catholic martyr, 52 (executed)

1649

- 30 January – Charles I of England, former Prince of Wales, 48 (executed)
- 24 April – John Poyer, rebel commander (executed)

1650

- 25 March – John Williams, Archbishop of York, 68
- March/April – Thomas Howell (Bishop of Bristol), 62

1656

- 9 June – Thomas Tomkins, composer

1658

- September/October – Lucy Walter, former mistress of King Charles II

1659

- 3 June – Morgan Llwyd, Puritan preacher and writer

1660

- 13 August – Sir Owen Wynn, 3rd Baronet, 68
- 13 October (or 17) – John Jones Maesygarnedd, regicide (executed)
- 31 December – Thomas Powell, Welsh writer and cleric, 52/53 (born c. 1608)

1663

- 6 December – David Jenkins, judge

1664

- 22 June – Katherine Philips, poet, 33

1670

- 27 October – Vavasor Powell, Nonconformist leader and writer

1674

- 5 September – Colonel Philip Jones of Fonmon, 56?

1675

- 16 November (buried) – Rowland Laugharne, soldier

1676

- 26 December – Henry Vaughan, politician, 63

1677

- 2 November – Robert Sidney, 2nd Earl of Leicester, son of Robert Sidney, 1st Earl of Leicester, and Barbara Gamage
- 21 December – John Parry, Bishop of Ossory

1679

- 10 March – Francis Howell, Principal of Jesus College, Oxford, 54
- 13 April – Sir Thomas Morgan, 1st Baronet, soldier, 75
- 22 July – Philip Evans and John Lloyd, Roman Catholic priests (executed at Cardiff)

1680

- 27 March – William Maurice, antiquary (b. c.1620)
- 28 April – William Morgan (of Machen and Tredegar), politician

1681

- 18 December – Edward Turberville, informer

1682

- 8 October – Thomas Jones, priest

1683

- 24 August – John Owen, theologian. 67?
- 29 August – Philip Herbert, 7th Earl of Pembroke
- date unknown – Edward Vaughan (MP)

1685

- 6 February – King Charles II of England, former Prince of Wales, 54
- 15 July – James Scott, 1st Duke of Monmouth, son of King Charles II and Lucy Walter, 36 (executed)
- 1 September – Sir Leoline Jenkins, academic, jurist and politician, 60

1686

- 3 December – Richard Vaughan, 2nd Earl of Carbery, Carmarthenshire landowner, politician and soldier

1687

- 13 February – John Lloyd, Bishop of St David's, 48/9

1688

- 25 August – Henry Morgan, privateer

1689

- 18 April – George Jeffreys, 1st Baron Jeffreys, the "hanging judge"

1690

- 8 September – Sir William Glynne, 1st Baronet, politician, 62
- date unknown
  - Rhys Cadwaladr, poet
  - David Edwardes, landowner and herald, about 60

1691

- 16 March – Elizabeth Herbert, Marchioness of Powis, about 56
- March – Bishop Hugh Gore, founder of Swansea Grammar School, 77/8
- 21 April – Henry Herbert, 4th Baron Herbert of Chirbury
- 30 October – Henry Maurice, theologian, about 44
- date unknown – William Price, Royalist colonel

1692

- 16 January – Thomas Wynne, personal physician of William Penn and one of the original settlers of Philadelphia, 64
- 22 January – Lewis Owen, politician, 69/70
- 16 February – David Lloyd, biographer, 56
- 31 May – Thomas Jones, judge, 77
- September – Richard Williams, politician, about 38
- date unknown
  - Jane Myddelton, court beauty, wife of Charles Myddelton of Ruabon

1693

  - Sir Trevor Williams, 1st Baronet
- 22 July – John Davies, translator, 68
- 22 November – Thomas Phillips, engineer

1694

- 4 February – Eubule Thelwall, lawyer and landowner, 73
- 10 September – Thomas Lloyd, lieutenant governor of Pennsylvania
- date unknown – Siôn Dafydd Las, one of the last household bards

1695

- 26 March – George Nevill, 12th Baron Bergavenny, 29
- 28 April – Henry Vaughan, poet, 73

1696

- 2 June – William Herbert, 1st Marquess of Powis, 69
- 7 September – John Powell, judge, 63/4
- 23 December – Sir William Williams, 6th Baronet, politician
- date unknown – Thomas Mackworth, Shropshire politician, married into the Bulkeley family, 68/9

1697

- 18 January – Sir Erasmus Philipps, 3rd Baronet, of Picton Castle, 63/4
- September – Samuel Jones, Nonconformist minister, 69

1698

- 10 September (buried) – Henry Bulkeley, politician, about 57

1699

- 25 May – Bussy Mansell, politician, 75
- May – Pierce Lewis, clergyman and Bible editor, 36
- 20 August – Thomas Wilkins, antiquarian, 63/65

1700

- 27 June – Hugh Owen, Independent minister, 60?
- 11 July – William Williams, Speaker of the House of Commons, 66
- September – Sir John Aubrey, 2nd Baronet, politician
- 8 December – Edward Harley, politician, 76
- 16 December – Thomas Morgan (of Dderw), politician, 36 (smallpox)
