= Walter Cradock =

Welsh Anglican clergyman

- Born: 1606
- Died: 1659 (aged 52–53)
- Other names: Craddock, Cradoc
- Occupation: Welsh Anglican clergyman

Walter Cradock (Craddock, Cradoc) (c. 1606 – 1659) was a Welsh Anglican clergyman, who became a travelling evangelical preacher. He was a founder of the first Independent church in Wales in 1638, at Llanvaches, with William Wroth and William Thomas, an early Baptist.

== Life ==
He was born at Trefela, near Llangwm, Monmouthshire, and is believed to have been educated at the University of Oxford. His first position was as a curate, at Peterston-super-Ely, Glamorgan.

In 1633 William Erbery, Vicar of St.Mary's, Cardiff, Cradock his curate there, and William Wroth, were reported to William Laud, and the Court of High Commission turned them out for unorthodox preaching, and on the technical grounds and acid test of orthodoxy, of refusing to read the Book of Sports. From late in 1634 Cradock spent almost a year in Wrexham, preaching, and making a convert of Morgan Llwyd. From there Cradock had to move to Herefordshire, where he met Vavasor Powell. With John Miles, Cradock, Erbery, Powell, and Llwyd are the group of recognised Puritan leaders, who founded the later Welsh Nonconformist congregations, whether Baptist, Congregationalist, Presbyterian or Quaker.

He was also at Shrewsbury at this period. Sir Robert Harley, of Brampton Bryan, Herefordshire, took Cradock in, during 1639. He moved on to Llanfair Waterdine, and an independent congregation there. On the outbreak of the English Civil War the Llanvaches congregation, an independent conventicle, moved with Cradock to Bristol, where there was an independent church at Broadmead. Since royalist forces then occupied Bristol, in 1643, some moved again to London, and made contact with Henry Jessey, who had been a supporter of the congregation from the start; Cradock preached with Jessey at All-Hallows-the-Great.

In 1641 Cradock was in the group of preachers for Wales authorized by the Long Parliament : others were Erbery, Ambrose Mostyn, Richard Symonds, and Henry Walter. These Welsh radicals formed a tight and effective lobbying group, and held together until the mid-1650s. Parliament renewed similar authority, in 1645 and 1646, with funding; it was also specified that Symonds, Henry Walter and Cradock should preach in Welsh. Cradock had already shown he could do that in 1645, preaching to captured royalist Welshman after the battle of Naseby.

He was one of the “Welsh saints”, who commanded troops of Thomas Harrison with Vavasor Powell and Jenkin Jones. He was later appointed the regular preacher to Barebone's Parliament, at St. Margaret's, Westminster.

He was a supporter of Oliver Cromwell, and when controversy arose over Cromwell's Protectorate, he condemned Vavasor Powell's anti-Cromwell pamphlet The Word of God. The majority of the Welsh Puritan group of which he had been a founder agreed with him. He withdrew, to a living at Llangwm.

== Works ==
- The Saints Fulnesse of Joy (1646)
- Gospel-Libertie (1648)
- Mount Sion or the Privilege and Practice of the Saints (1649)
- Divine Drops (1650)
- Gospel-Holinesse (1655)
