= Henry Walter =

Henry Walter may refer to:

- Henry Walter (priest) (1611–1678?), Welsh Anglican priest who became a Puritan
- Henry Walter (antiquary) (1785–1859), English cleric and antiquary
- Henry G. Walter Jr. (1910–2000), American businessman
- Henry John Walter (died 1905), businessman and mayor of Dunedin
- Henry Russell Walter (born 1986), known professionally as Cirkut, Canadian record producer and songwriter
