= William Wroth =

William Wroth (1576–1641), was a Church of England minister. He is credited with the establishment of the first Independent Church in Wales in 1639. From 1617 until 1639 Wroth was Rector of the parish church at Llanvaches in Monmouthshire where his Congregationalist chapel was founded.

== Life ==
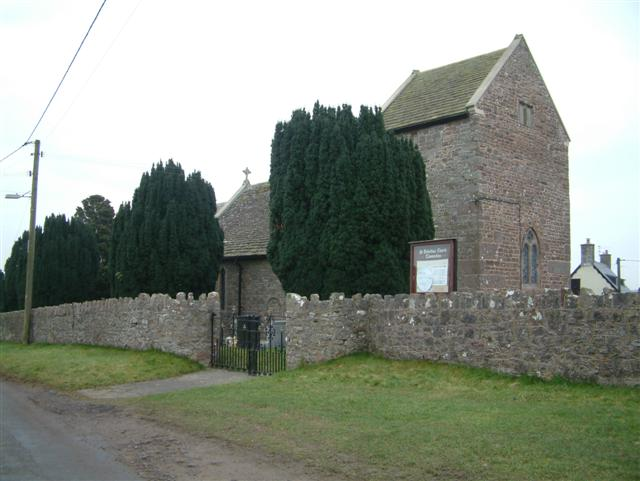
Church of St. Dubricius at Llanvaches where Wroth was Rector

Wroth was raised in Abergavenny, and educated at the University of Oxford, gaining a BA from Christ Church in 1596 and an MA in 1605 from Jesus College. Tradition suggests he accompanied Sir Edward Lewis of Van, Caerphilly as a servant.

He was promised the Rectory of Llanvaches in 1610 by Lewis, once it became vacant. It did so in the following year, but there was some impediment to it being granted. In 1613 he was instead granted the Rectory of Llanfihangel Roggiet, which he held until 1626. He was appointed Rector of Llanvaches in 1617 and then held both in plural. Even together, these were not a wealthy living and he maintained his connections with the Lewis family, acting as a family chaplain and as a property agent.

Until the 1620s Wroth was apparently "much addicted to mirth, levity, and music". However, he became a changed man in 1625–1626 after one of his parishioners, who had won a legal case in London and had instructed his family to arrange a feast on his return with music provided by Wroth, died on the road home. "Amidst the general consternation, Mr. Wroth cast away his violin, and falling on his knees in the midst of the company, most fervently prayed for the blessing of God upon this alarming providence." This conversion also led to him resigning the living of Llanvihangel in 1626, as the new Puritans disapproved of such pluralism.

He became, after John Parry, the earliest Puritan church leader in Wales and was a direct influence on fellow churchman, Walter Cradock. Cradock, the son of a neighbouring farmer, was also educated at Oxford and was to become curate of St.Mary's Church in Cardiff, where the vicar at the time was William Erbury.

In 1633, King Charles I, advised by the Archbishop of Canterbury, William Laud, reissued the "Declaration of Sports", setting out a list of sports that could be played on Sundays and other holy days, and published to counteract Puritan calls for strict abstinence on the Sabbath. Wroth refused to proclaim the declaration and was reported to the Court of High Commission. Wroth's response was a proclamation he published in the churchyard;

Who Ever hear on Sonday
Will Practis Playing at Ball
It May be before Monday
The Devil Will Have you All

At Llanvaches, Wroth's preaching became so popular that the large crowds attending from neighboring counties compelled Worth to preach in the churchyard as the church itself was too small. In 1639, although still formally a member of the Church of England, Wroth formed a 'gathered church' within the parish church at Llanvaches, whose members were bound together through a church covenant and were the only ones who received the sacraments, although they continued to worship with the unconverted in the parish church. Wroth is known to have preached at Broad Mead chapel in Bristol, with those of similar views. His 'gathered church' at Llanvaches was organised "according to the New England pattern" – that is, Congregational, following the example of John Cotton and other Puritan leaders in New England – and was constituted in November 1639 with the help of the fellow leading Dissenter, Henry Jessey. The historic meeting at Llanvaches in November 1639 marked the real beginning of Nonconformism in Wales.

Wroth died in early 1641, shortly before the outbreak of the first English Civil War, and was buried at Llanvaches parish church, although no memorial survives. His will read:

I leave my body to be buried where ye Lord shall please to call for mee praying him to bring my hoarie-head into the grave in his peace which passeth all understanding.

The current Tabernacle United Reformed Church Chapel was built in the 1920s. The original church stood in the neighbouring hamlet of Carrow Hill and was rebuilt in Llanvaches in 1802, when a suitable plot of land was found.
