= Virgilio Malvezzi =

Italian essayist and soldier

The Most Illustrious Virgilio Malvezzi
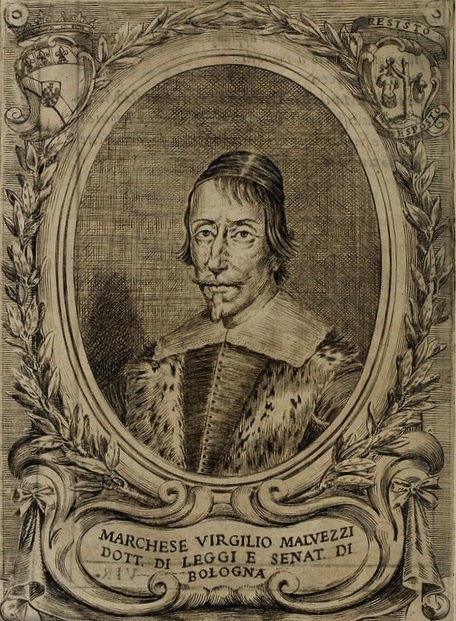
- Portrait of Virgilio Malvezzi. From the book "Memorie imprese, e ritratti de' signori Accademici Gelati", 1672
- Born: 8 September 1595; Bologna, Papal States
- Died: 11 August 1654 (aged 58); Castel Guelfo, Bologna, Papal States
- Resting place: San Giacomo Maggiore, Bologna
- Other name: Grivilio Vezzalmi
- Education: University of Bologna
- Occupations: Writer; Intellectual; Diplomat
- Parent(s): Piriteo Malvezzi and Beatrice Malvezzi (née Orsini)
- Relatives: Francesco Sforza Pallavicino (nephew)
- Family: Malvezzi family
- Writing career
- Language: Italian, Spanish
- Notable works: Discorsi sopra Cornelio Tacito; Il Tarquinio; Il Ritratto del Privato politico christiano

Virgilio Malvezzi, Marchese (Marquis) di Castel Guelfo (Italian: [virˈdʒiːljo malvɛtsi]; 8 September 1595 – 11 August 1654) was an Italian historian, essayist, soldier and diplomat. Born in Bologna, he became court historian to Philip IV of Spain. His work was hugely influential and was praised by Francisco de Quevedo and Baltasar Gracián among others.

== Life ==
Virgilio Malvezzi was born in Bologna of noble parents on 8 September 1595. The Malvezzi, whose main residence was the estate of Castel Guelfo di Bologna, were one of the most prominent and wealthy families in Bologna. His father, Piriteo Malvezzi, was a senator and his mother an Orsini of Rome. After finishing his law degree at the local university in 1616 he followed his family to Siena, where his father had been appointed governor of the city for Grand Duke Cosimo II. In Siena Virgilio met Fabio Chigi, the future Pope Alexander VII, which resulted in a lifelong friendship.

Following the family tradition he entered Spanish military service in 1625. He fought in the Spanish Army in Flanders and under the command of the Governor of Milan Gómez Suárez de Figueroa in Piedmont. Malvezzi was present at the siege of Verrua Savoia in August 1625 before contracting an illness and returning to Bologna in October. In 1627 he inherited his father's title and estates.

In 1635 Malvezzi published Il ritratto del privato politico christiano, a biography of the Count-Duke of Olivares, valido or chief minister of King Philip IV of Spain. Malvezzi's work soon appeared in a Spanish translation and attracted the attention of Olivares himself, who called him to Madrid, where he arrived in 1636, to serve as the official historian of the reign of Philip IV. He became a member of both the Council of State and the Council of War. By the late 1630s Malvezzi's credentials as a scholar and historian were somewhat tarnished by the closeness of his relationship to Olivares; but his Romulus, published in his native Bologna in 1629, had won him an international reputation. In the early 1640s Philip IV of Spain entrusted him with several important missions. In 1640 he was one of the ambassadors sent by Philip to England, in an attempt to avert the marriage of Mary Stuart to William II of Orange. In 1641, he was sent to Flanders as advisor to the Cardinal-Infante Ferdinand of Austria. He returned to Madrid in 1643.

In 1645, about the time of Olivares's death, Malvezzi left Spain and returned to Italy, taking up residence in his native Bologna. He was admitted to the Accademia dei Gelati in Bologna under the name "Esposto" (exposed), and he held the position of "Prince" of the Academy for two years. In 1646 he was appointed gonfaloniere di giustizia. A connoisseur of painting, Malvezzi was a close friend of Guido Reni and Diego Velázquez and a patron of the arts. According to the seventeenth-century art historian Carlo Cesare Malvasia, he was a frequent visitor to the workshops of the painters Alessandro Tiarini, Angelo Michele Colonna and Agostino Mitelli. He died in Bologna on 11 August 1654, and was buried in the Church of San Giacomo Maggiore.

== Writing ==
In his youth Malvezzi wrote a commentary to Tacitus in the tradition of Justus Lipsius, soon establishing a reputation as a Christian neo-Stoic and anti-Ciceronian humanist.

Malvezzi used a sententious style, reminiscent of Tacitus and Seneca, which found many admirers even among the Spanish conceptists. His taste for the paradoxical and the epigrammatic, for abrupt transitions and contrived obscurity was praised as “elegantly laconic” and was much admired by Olivares who made him the historian of his regime. On the other hand, Malvezzi's literary style was criticized for its opacity by the translator Thomas Powell and by John Milton, who unkindly remarked that Malvezzi “can cut Tacitus into slivers and steaks”.

Malvezzi's anti-Ciceronianism could not be made more evident than by his defense of “obscurity” in Tacitus. He regarded Tacitus as the loftiest master of the “laconic style,” no less superior to the “asiatic than pure wine is to watered wine.” Its very obscurity imparts to the reader the same pleasure deriving from the metaphor inasmuch as it challenges him to integrate the apparent gaps in the sentence by intervening with his own wit. Malvezzi's style has been lavishly praised in Gracián's Agudeza y arte de ingenio. In Gracián's eyes Malvezzi's peculiar genius was to have combined the critical style of a historian with the 'sententious' style of the philosopher (Agudeza, Discurso 62, 380–1).

His political thought was in the tradition of Machiavelli. He composed a series of political biographies of famous princes from Roman and Jewish history probably reminiscent of Xenophon's Cyropaedia where it is easy to recognise Machiavelli's lasting influence: Romulo (1629), Tarquinio il Superbo (1632), and Davide perseguitato (1634). His Tarquin openly argues the case for dissimulation in politics.

His biography of Olivares (Ritratto del Privato Politico Christiano) has been called hagiography. It argued that he was right to invoke the reason of state on behalf of the Spanish Empire.

== English translations ==
Mavezzi's Discourses upon Cornelius Tacitus, translated by Sir Richard Baker and first published in 1642, were dedicated by the publisher Richard Whitaker to William Fiennes, 1st Viscount Saye and Sele. Henry Carey, 2nd Earl of Monmouth translated both Romulo and Il Tarquinio Superbo and had them published together in one volume in 1637, whereas the two Italian source texts had come out separately in 1629 and 1632. The 1648 edition of Monmouth's translation of Romulus was prefaced by verses from Robert Stapylton, Thomas Carew, John Suckling, and William Davenant. Two of Malvezzi's letters were translated and published in 1651 as Stoa triumphans by Thomas Powell, a close friend of the poet Henry Vaughan. The pourtract of the politicke Christian-Favourite, a translation of Il Ritratto del Privato Politico Christiano, was published anonymously in London in 1647. Malvezzi's Chief Events in the Monarchy of Spain in the Year 1639 and Considerations upon the lives of Alcibiades and Coriolanus were translated by Robert Gentilis and published respectively in 1647 and 1650 by Moseley. John Nichols claimed that Thomas Gordon's commentaries on Tacitus were derivative from the work of Virgilio Malvezzi, Scipione Ammirato and Baltasar Alamos de Barrientos.

== Works ==
He wrote in Italian and Spanish, and was early translated into Latin, Spanish, German and English, with a Dutch edition of 1679. A list of his works is shown below:

- Discorsi sopra Cornelio Tacito del conte Virgilio Maluezzi. Al serenissimo Ferdinando II. Gran duca di Toscana. Venezia: Marco Ginami. 1622.
- Il Tarquinio superbo. Bologna: Clemente Ferroni. 1632.
- Dauide perseguitato del marchese Virgilio Maluezzi dedicato alla cattolica maesta' di Filippo IIII. il grande. Bologna: Giacomo Monti. 1634.
- Il Ritratto del Privato politico christiano. Bologna. 1635.
- Sucesos principales de la monarquia de España en el año 1639 (in Spanish). Madrid: Imprenta Real. 1640.* Considerationi con occasione d'alc.i luoghi delle vite d'Alcibiade, e di Coriolano le fece il marchese Virgilio Maluezzi. Bologna. 1648.
- Successi principali della Monarchia di Spagna nell'anno 1639. Bologna: Giacomo Monti. 1651.
- Introduttione al racconto de' principali successi accaduti sotto il comando del potentissimo re Filippo quarto. Roma: per gl'heredi del Corbelletti. 1651.

== Translations ==
- El Romulo. Translated by Francisco de Quevedo Villegas. Milan: Giovanni Malatesta, 1632. Followed by Naples: Egidius Longius, 1635; Tortosa: Francisco Martorell, 1636); Lisbon: Paulo Craesbeeck, 1648 (together with David perseguido and Tarquino).
- El Tarquino soberbio del Marques Virgilio Malvezzi. Translated by Antonio Pedrosa. Milan: Giovanni Malatesta, 1633.
- Tarquino el Sobervio. Translated by Francisco Bolle Pintaflor. Madrid: Imprenta Real, 1635.
- David perseguido ... traducele de Italiano un Religioso de la Orden de Clerigos Regulares. Madrid: Imprenta Real, 1635.
- David perseguido ... traducido de Toscano en Español Castellano. Translated by Álvaro de Toledo. Milan: Phelipe Chrisolfi, 1635. Followed by Barcelona: P. Lacavalleria, 1636 and Tortosa: F. Martorell, 1636.
- Virgilio Malvezzi, Retrato del privado christiano politico: deducido de las acciones del Conde Duque. Translated by Francisco de Balboa y Paz. Naples: Ottavio Beltrano, 1635.
- Virgilii Malvezzi Marchionis Princeps, eiusque arcana: in Vita Romuli repræsentata. Translated by Johannes Kruuss. Leiden: Elzevier. 1636.
- Virgilii Malvezii Marchionis Persecutio Davidis: Politice tractata. Leiden: Livius, 1636, reprints in 1640, 1643 and 1650.
- Davide Perseguitato: David Persecuted. Translated by Robert Ashley, London: Thomas Knight, 1637. Reissues by Humphrey Mosely in 1647, 1648 and 1650.
- Romulus and Tarquin. First Written in Italian by the Marques Virgilio Malvezzi: And Now Taught English. Translated by Henry Monmouth. London: John Benson, 1637, reprinted in 1638 and reissued by Humphrey Mosely in 1648.
- Leben Romuli Königs in Rom. Zerbst: s.n., 1638.
- Den opgang ende ondergang der koningē en princen ... door het leven van Romulus en Tarquinius. Translated by Charles de Muliers. Haarlem: s.n., 1638. Followed by an edition of Romulus on its own: Den Verre-kijcker der princen: door het leven van Romulus ontdeckende alderley materien van staete. Translated by Charles de Muliers. Gouda: Willem van der Hoeve, 1651.
- Der Verfolgte David. Translated by Wilhelm von Kalcheim Lohausen. Rostock: M. Meder, 1638, reissue Köthen: Fürstliche Drückerei, 1643.
- La libra de Grivilio Vezzalmi [pseudonym] traducida de Italiano en lengua castellana, pesanse las ganancias, y las perdidas de la monarquia de España en el felicissimo reynado de Filipe IV el Grande. Translated by Vicenzo Bove. Pamplona and Naples: Giacomo Caffaro, 1639.
- Discourses upon Cornelius Tacitus. Written in Italian by the Learned Marquese Virgilio Malvezzi. Translated by Richard Baker. London: R. Whitaker and Tho. Whitaker. 1642.
- Tarquin le superbe, avec des considérations politiques et morales sur les principaux événements de sa vie. Translated by Charles de Vion. Paris: J. le Bouc, 1644.
- Le Romulus du marquis de Malvezzi, avec des considérations politiques et morales sur sa vie. Paris: J. Le Bouc, 1645, reprint 1650.
- Reflexions sur la vie de Tarquin dernier Roy de Rome. Translated by Louis de Benoist. Avignon: Ican Piot, 1646.
- The Pourtract of the Politicke Christian-Favourite. Originally drawn from some of the actions of the Lord Duke of St. Lucar. ... To this translation is annexed the chiefe State Maxims .... and .... observations .... upon the same story of Count Olivares, Duke of St. Lucar. London. 1647.
- The Chiefe Events of the Monarchie of Spaine, in the Yeare 1639. Translated by Robert Gentilis. London: Humphrey Moseley, 1647.
- Der Romulus, und Tarquinius der Hoffertige. Das ist: Das Leben Des Ersten und Letzten Königs der Römer. Translated by Ludwig Fürst Anhalt-Köthen. Zerbst: Andreas Betzel. 1647.
- Las obras del Marquez Virgilio Malvezzi: David perseguido, Romulo, y Tarquino. Translated by Francisco de Quevedo. Lisbon: Paulo Craesbeeck. 1648.
- Considerations upon the Lives of Alcibiades and Coriolanus. Translated by Robert Gentilis. London: Humphrey Moseley, 1650.
- Romulus & Tarquinius Superbus: quorum ille principis iste tyranni rara doctrina exhibet ideam. Frankfurt: Serlinus, 1656.
- Historia Politica, de Persecutione Davidis: variis considerationibus prudenter concinnata. Leiden: Leffen, 1660.
- Alcibiades capitan i ciudadano ateniense: su vida. Translated by Gregorio Tapia y Salcedo. Madrid: Domingo Garcia y Morras, 1668.
- Historisch-polityke werken des markgraefs Virgil Malvezzi: vol ongemeene, heerlijke en christelijke regelen van staet. Translated by Mattheus Smallegange. Amsterdam: Joannes Janssonius van Waesberge en zonen, 1679.
- Bedenkingen over Corn. Tacitus, en proefstukken van historie. Translated by Mattheus Smallegange. Amsterdam: Joannes Janssonius van Waesberge en zonen. 1680.
- Proefstukken van historie of bysondre voorvallen in de monarchie van Spaenjen op het jaer 1639. Translated by Mattheus Smallegange. Amsterdam: Joannes Janssonius van Waesberge en zonen, 1680.

== Bibliography ==
- Scott, Mary Augusta (1899). "Elizabethan Translations from the Italian: The Titles of Such Works Now First Collected and Arranged, with Annotations: IV. Miscellanea". PMLA. 14 (4): 465–571. doi:10.2307/456545. JSTOR 456545.
- Brändli, Rodolfo (1964). Virgilio Malvezzi, politico e moralista. tipografia del'USC.
- Virgilio Malvezzi (2013). Edoardo Ripari (ed.). Opere. Bologna: Persiani.
- Colomer, José Luis (1991). "La France et l'Espagne en guerre. Virgilio Malvezzi dans la polémique française sur le style "coupé"". L'Âge d'or de l'influence espagnole: La France et l'Espagne à l'èpoque d'Anne d'Autriche (1615-1666). Actes du colloque (25-28 janvier 1990, Bordeaux). Montpellier: 229–240.
- Elliott, J. H. (1991). Richelieu and Olivares. Cambridge University Press. ISBN 9780521406741.
- Colomer, José Luis (1993). "'Dar a Su Magestad algo bueno': Four Letters from Velázquez to Virgilio Malvezzi". The Burlington Magazine. 135 (1079): 67–72. JSTOR 885448.
- Bulletta, Silvia (1995). Virgilio Malvezzi e la storiografia classica. Milan: Istituto di propaganda libraria.
- Belligni, Eleonora (1999). Lo Scacco della prudenza. Precettistica politica ed esperienza storica in Virgilio Malvezzi. Florence: Leo S. Olschki.
- García López, J. (2001). "El estilo de una corte: apuntes sobre Virgilio Malvezzi y el laconismo hispano". Quaderns d'Italià. 6: 155–169. doi:10.5565/rev/qdi.63. hdl:10256/15237.
- Bertoldi, Paola (2002). "Malvezzi, Virgilio". The Oxford Companion to Italian Literature. Oxford University Press. ISBN 978-0-19-818332-7.
- Blanco Morel, M. (2004). "Quevedo lector de Malvezzi". La Perinola: Revista de investigación quevediana. 8: 77–108.
- Morando, Simona (2005). "Chiabrera, Malvezzi e due lettere dimenticate". Lettere Italiane. 57 (3): 443–466. JSTOR 26267020.
- Aricò, Denise (2007). ""Vestire la persona de gli altri". I discorsi immaginari di Virgilio Malvezzi tra Tito Livio, Guicciardini e Mascardi". Studi secenteschi. XLVIII: 3–37.
- Iamartino, G.; Manzi, A. (2018). "Mirrors for Princes: Paratexts and Political Stance in Henry Carey's Translations of Romulo and Il Tarquinio Superbo by Virgilio Malvezzi". Thresholds of Translation. Early Modern Literature in History. Palgrave Macmillan. pp. 207–227. doi:10.1007/978-3-319-72772-1_9. ISBN 978-3-319-72771-4.
