= Vavasor Powell =

Welsh minister

Vavasor (or Vavasour) Powell (1617 – 27 October 1670) was a Welsh Puritan and Fifth Monarchist, imprisoned for his role in a plot to depose King Charles II.

== Early life ==
Powell was born in Knucklas, Radnorshire, and may have been educated at Jesus College, Oxford. He returned to Wales as a schoolmaster (1638–1639), during which time he was converted to the Puritan understanding of the Gospel under the preaching of the Puritan Walter Cradock, and through the writings of Richard Sibbs (1577–1635) and William Perkins (1558–1602).

== Preaching ==
In about 1639 Powell became an itinerant preacher and was arrested twice for preaching in various parts of Wales in 1640. However, he was not punished and during the Civil War he preached in and around London. In the same year he was the first minister of Pendref Chapel, Llanfyllin, which is said to be the oldest Welsh independent church in Powys.

On 26 December 1641 he was preaching in Llanyre Parish Church in Rhos when he was forcibly removed by Hugh Lloyd and twelve armed men and imprisoned.

In 1646, when Parliament's victory was certain, Powell returned to Wales having received a "certificate of character" from the Westminster Assembly, although he had refused to be ordained by the Presbyterians. With a salary granted to him by parliament he resumed his itinerant preaching in Wales.

== Advisor to Parliament and controversy ==
In 1650 Parliament appointed a commission for the better propagation and preaching of the gospel in Wales, with Powell acting as one of the principal advisers of this body. For three years he was actively employed in removing from their parishes those ministers whom he regarded as incompetent.

During this time Powell was involved in a controversy with Welsh poet Katherine Philips. Powell had published a poem celebrating the regicide of Charles I, and Philips responded with hers, Upon the Double Murder of King Charles in Answer to a Libellous Rhyme made by V.P. This was one of her first forays into political writing, and she is one of the first women to do so in literature. When it became apparent the poem may be published, and so embarrass her husband James Philips, she was forced to apologise. She did so in the form of another poem but whilst distancing herself from the views of her husband she reinforced her criticism of Powell.

== Preaching in London and royal plot ==
In 1653 Powell returned to London to preach at St Ann Blackfriars after the death of their pastor, William Gouge. Having denounced Cromwell for accepting the office of Lord Protector, he was imprisoned.

At the Restoration, on 18 July 1660, the Council of King Charles II issued an order to Sir Matthew Price, High Sheriff of Montgomeryshire to take into safe custody Vavasour Powell (described as, "a most factious and dangerous minister"), Sir Richard Saltonstall, and Richard Price of Aberbechan. According to Price's letters to Secretary of State Edward Nicholas, Vavasour Powell, Saltonstall and Price were concerned in a plot to depose King Charles II. Letters were found in their possession indicating the plot extended all the way to London. By 2 August 1660 Vavasour Powell was taken into custody, while Sir Richard Saltonstall and Captain Richard Price "had left these parts" (Montgomeryshire).

Powell remained in prison for seven years. He was imprisoned at Southsea Castle in September 1667. He was set free in 1667, but in the following year he was again imprisoned and was in custody until his death on 27 October 1670. Powell is buried at Bunhill Fields cemetery in London.

== Work ==
Powell wrote eleven books and some hymns but his chief gifts were those of a preacher. During his ministry he preached before the Lord Mayor of London (1649), Parliament (1650) and as an ardent defender of Calvinism held disputations with popular Arminians of his day.

While remaining a relatively minor figure in seventeenth-century Puritan history since his death, Powell's place in the Puritan movement has been reassessed in recent years. The twentieth-century Welsh theologian R. Tudur Jones wrote of Powell:

Vavasor Powell deserves better of historians than to be dismissed as a millenarian enthusiast. In many ways, Powell was the most striking personality amongst the Welsh Puritans.

That estimation has been heeded as Powell has been the subject of doctoral dissertations as well as several peer-reviewed papers and presentations. Powell has emerged as a leading case study for the right wing elements of seventeenth century English Non Conformity and their relationship to the larger Puritan movement.

== Writing and hymns ==
Writing and hymns by Powell include the following:

=== Written work in English ===
- The Scriptures Concord, London, 1646
- God the Father glorified, London, 1649
- Christ and Moses Excellency, London, 1650
- Saving faith, London, 1651
- Christ exalted, 1651
- Three Hymns, London, 1650
- Common-Prayer Book no divine service, London, 1660
- The Bird in the cage, London, 1661
- The Sufferers-catechism, 1664
- A New and useful concordance, London, 1671
- Divine Love, London, 1677
- The golden sayings, sentences and experiences of Mr. Vavasor Powell [...], London, undated (c. 1675) OCLC 766915441

=== Notable hymns in Welsh ===
- Crist, fy ngorffwysfa benaf yw
- Alldudion y'm tra yn y byd
- Duw yw ein gobaith yn ddiffael
- Mor weddaidd ar fynyddoedd yw
