= Llanvaches =

Village and community in Newport, Wales

Llanvaches: Welsh: Llanfaches
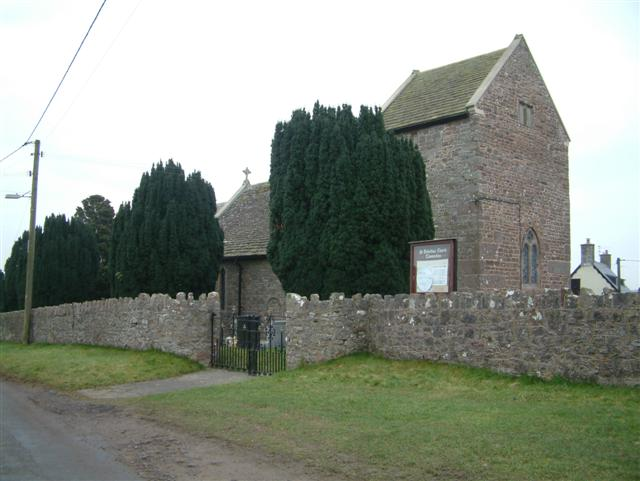
- Church of Saint Dubricius

- Location within Newport
- Population: 365 (2001 census)
- Principal area: Newport
- Country: Wales
- Sovereign state: United Kingdom
- Post town: NEWPORT
- Postcode district: NP26
- Dialling code: 01633; Llanwern and Penhow exchanges
- Police: Gwent
- Fire: South Wales
- Ambulance: Welsh
- UK Parliament: Newport East
- List of places UK Wales Newport 51.6218°N 2.8186°W Map of the community

Llanvaches (Welsh: Llanfaches) is a village and community within the boundaries of the city of Newport, Wales. It lies to the east of the urban area, in the historic county of Monmouthshire and the preserved county of Gwent. The population rose to 402 by the 2011 census.

== Location ==
Llanvaches is located roughly midway between the market town of Chepstow and the centre of Newport. The village lies just north of the A48 road and below Wentwood, with both Newport centre and Chepstow about 7 miles (11 km) distant.

== History ==
The village is named after Saint Maches (Latin: Machuta), a daughter of Saint Gwynllyw or Woolos and sister of Saint Cadoc, who according to tradition lived a humble life as a shepherdess in the 5th century but was killed by robbers stealing her finest ram. Saint Tathan, Abbot of nearby Caerwent, to whom the murderers confessed their crime, built a church on the spot where she was killed, which became known as Merthyr Maches and later Llanfaches (the letter m mutating to -f- in Welsh).

The parish church largely dates from the 14th century and is dedicated to Saint Dubricius (Welsh Dyfrig), with Bishops Transcripts dating back to 1725. The church is Grade II listed building. The minister is Revd D. C. Frett.

=== The First Independent Church in Wales ===
The first Independent Church in Wales was founded at Llanvaches in 1638 by William Wroth (1576–1642), Rector from 1617. In 1633, King Charles I, advised by the Archbishop of Canterbury, William Laud, reissued the "Declaration of Sports". This listed the sports that were permitted on Sundays and other holy days, and was published to counteract the growing Puritan calls for strict abstinence on the Sabbath day. Wroth defied Charles' instruction to read the Declaration to his congregation, and in 1634 the Bishop of Llandaff reported him to the Court of High Commission, seeking to remove him from his position in the Church. In 1638 Wroth, along with fellow dissenter Walter Craddock, resigned, but continued to preach and gather followers. His preaching became so popular that people travelled from Somerset, Gloucester, Hereford, Radnor and Glamorgan to Llanvaches to hear him, and it became necessary for him to preach in the churchyard because the church was too small to accommodate all those who attended. By 1639, although he had not formally left the Church of England, Wroth is likely to have been ejected from his living. He set up his Congregationalist chapel, "according to the New England pattern", completed in 1639, with the help of the leading Dissenter, Henry Jessey. The historic meeting at Llanvaches in November 1639 marked the real beginning of Non-conformity in Wales. Wroth died shortly before the outbreak of the first English Civil War, and was buried beneath the church porch at Llanvaches. His will, at one time on display in the church vestry, concluded:

"I leave my body to be buried where ye Lord shall please to call for mee praying him to bring my hoarie-head into the grave in his peace which passeth all understanding"

The original church was built in the neighbouring hamlet of Carrow Hill and rebuilt in Llanvaches in 1802. In 1854 George Borrow passed the chapel on his walk from Newport to Chepstow, a journey later included in his 1862 Wild Wales. The current Tabernacle URC Chapel was remodelled in 1924.

=== Llanvaches Roman coin hoard ===
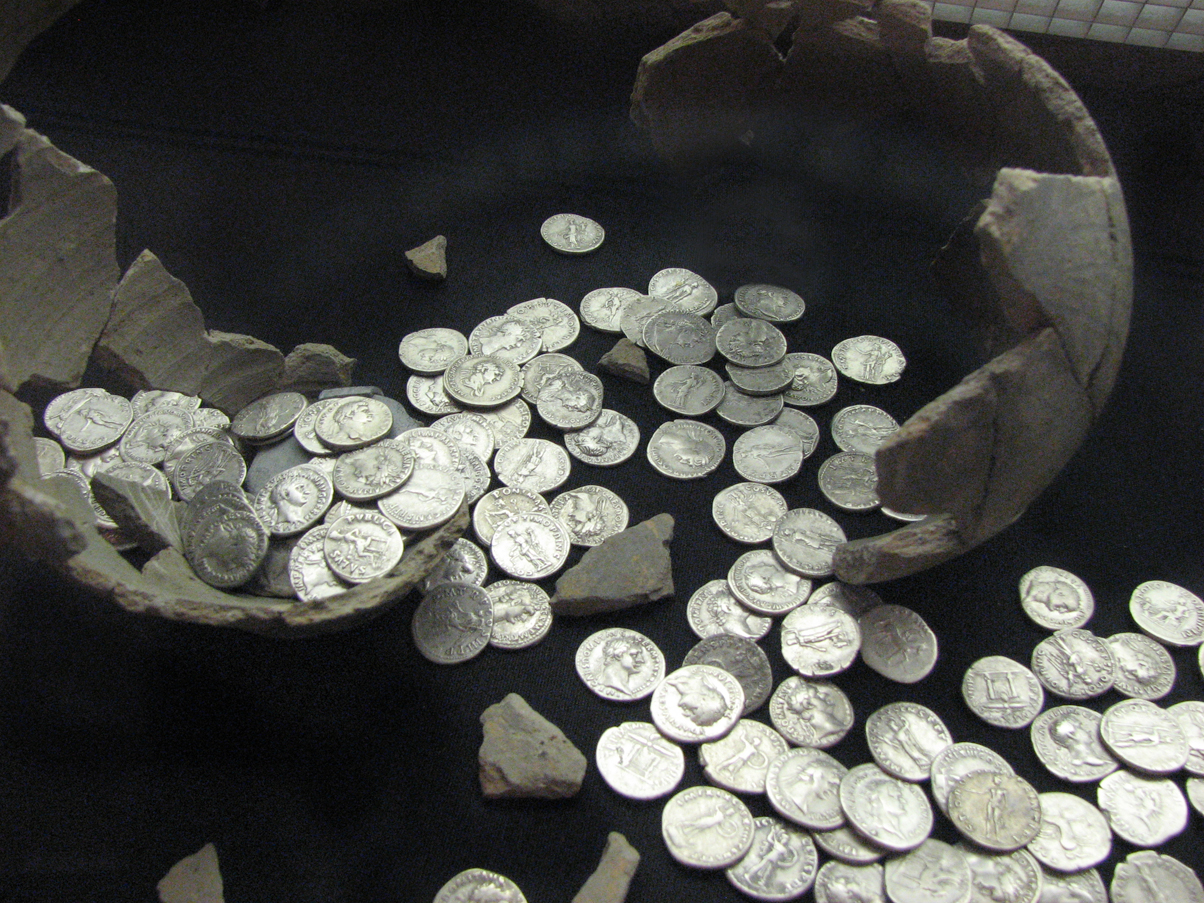
Hoard of Roman denarii found at Llanvaches in 2006

In 2006 a hoard of 599 silver denarii, hidden in a locally made cooking pot, was found at Llanvaches by a metal detectorist. The coins, which are dated to about AD 160, are now held at the National Roman Legion Museum in Caerleon.

== Amenities ==
Llanvaches is set in a quiet rural area. Access is via single track lanes with passing places. There are approximately 80 houses in the village which features a church, a church hall, a post box, a play park and a playing field. A bus stop is a ten minute walk from the village as are the Rock and Fountain pub and a scout den.

== Governance ==
The area is governed by the Newport City Council and the Llanvaches community council.
