= Morgan Llwyd =

Welsh Puritan

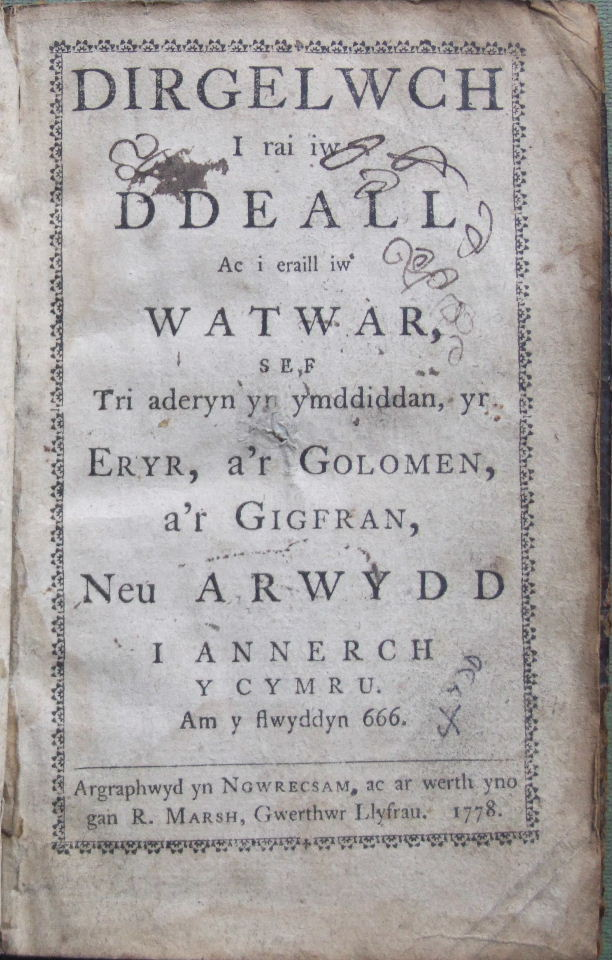
Title page of Llyfr y Tri Aderyn

Morgan Llwyd (1619 – 3 June 1659) was a Puritan Fifth Monarchist and Welsh-language poet and prose author.

== Biography ==
Morgan Llwyd was born to a cultured and influential family in the parish of Maentwrog, Gwynedd. His grandfather, Huw Llwyd, was a professional soldier and noted poet in the Welsh language, and also had a reputation as an astrologer and magician.

Morgan Llwyd was educated in Wrexham, where he experienced a religious awakening under the Puritan preacher Walter Cradock, whom he followed to Llanfaches in Monmouthshire, to be part of a Puritan church. During the English Civil War, he served as a chaplain in Oliver Cromwell's New Model Army, and in 1644 he returned to Wales, first as a preacher, and in 1650 as an Approver under the Act for the Propagation of the Gospel in Wales. In 1656 he settled as a minister in Wrexham, where he died in 1659; he is buried in the Dissenters' Burial Ground in Rhosddu.

He was known for his religious and philosophical writings, many of which contained complex symbolism.

Morgan Llwyd is credited with being the first Nonconformist minister in Wrexham. Ysgol Morgan Llwyd, the Welsh-medium high school in Wrexham, is named after him.

== Work ==
Morgan Llwyd was the author of seven prose works in Welsh and English, a considerable body of poetry, and translations of passages from the work of Jakob Böhme, taken from the English translations of John Sparrow. His most significant prose work is Llyfr y Tri Aderyn ('The Book of the Three Birds'), comprising a religious and political debate between a Raven, representing the High Church Anglican and Royalist faction under Cromwell's Commonwealth; an Eagle, representing its government; and a Dove, representing the Puritan faction, who convinces the Eagle of the truth of Puritan teaching and the validity of theocracy. In addition to this, the Raven and the Dove are compared with the Raven and Dove sent out from Noah's Ark to search for dry land, and history is represented as a hiatus between the divine judgement given in the Genesis flood narrative and the Last Judgement, which Morgan Llwyd expects to come very shortly.

Morgan Llwyd's three shorter prose works in Welsh are Llythyr i'r Cymry Cariadus, Gwaedd yng Nghymru yn Wyneb pob Cynwybod and Cyfarwydd i'r Cymru, in which he stresses the urgent need of his readers for a personal reconciliation with God. Of his three tracts in English, Lazarus and His Sisters Discoursing of Paradise and Where Is Christ? deal with theological matters, while An Honest Discourse Between Three Neighbours explores differing attitudes towards Oliver Cromwell's rule.

== Critical response ==
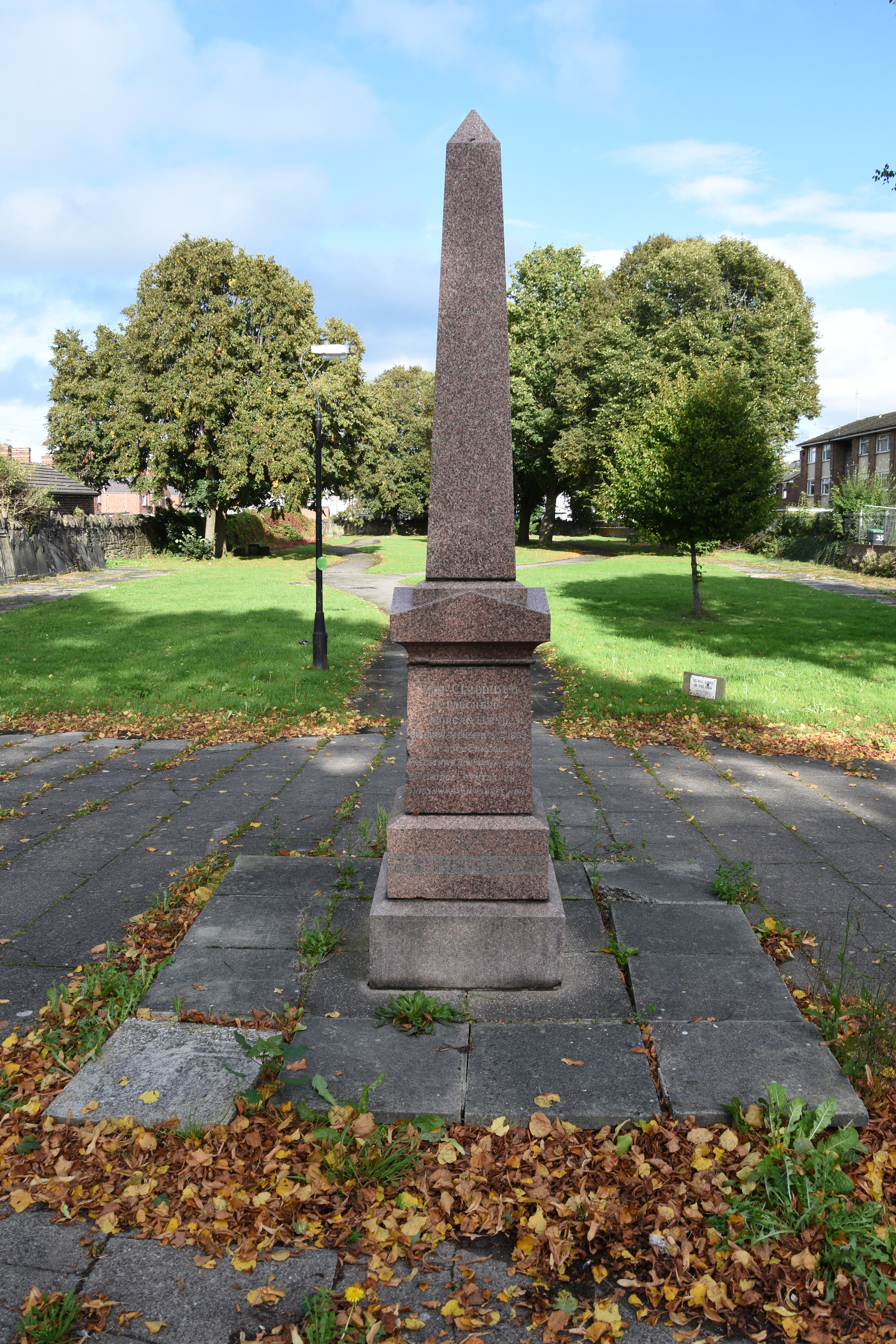
Memorial to Morgan Llwyd in the Dissenters' Burial Ground, Rhos-ddu, Wrexham, unveiled by Margaret Lloyd George in 1912

In an interview with Saunders Lewis, the short-story writer John Gwilym Jones speaks of his "immense" artistic debt to Llythyr i'r Cymry Cariadus and Llyfr y Tri Aderyn, whose style he studied closely and sought to imitate, while M. Wynn Thomas, in his monograph Morgan Llwyd, explores the poetic and imaginative richness of Llwyd's prose as a tool for expressing his intensely mystical religious vision. For Gwynfor Evans, Morgan Llwyd is a "Welsh nation builder", historically significant as a proponent of Puritanism in specifically Welsh cultural terms, and as a contributor to a modern Welsh national consciousness. Hugh Bevan considers his importance as a Puritan and writer in Morgan Llwyd y Llenor, while a book by Goronwy Owen, Rhwng Calfin a Böhme: Golwg ar Syniadaeth Morgan Llwyd, explores his theological and mystical ideas. Llyfr y Tri Aderyn was translated into English by L. J. Parry for the National Eisteddfod in 1896, and by Rob Mimpriss as A Book of Three Birds (Cockatrice Books, 2017).

== Bibliography ==
- Hugh Bevan, Morgan Llwyd y Llenor. Cardiff: University of Wales Press, 1954.
- Gwynfor Evans, Welsh Nation Builders. Llandysul: Gwasg Gomer, 1988. ISBN 9780863834172.
- John Gwilym Jones, "The Craft of the Short Story". The Plum Tree and Other Short Prose. Translated by Meic Stephens. Bridgend: Seren, 2004. ISBN 1854113534.
- Morgan Llwyd, A Book of Three Birds. Edited and translated by Rob Mimpriss. Cockatrice Books, 2017. ISBN 1912368137.
- Morgan Llwyd, Llyfr y Tri Aderyn: Allan o Argraffiad Urdd y Graddedigion o weithiau Morgan Llwyd. Cardiff: University of Wales Press, 1974. ISBN 0708305504.
- Morgan Llwyd, Ysgrifeniadau Morgan Llwyd. Edited by P. J. Donovan. Cardiff: University of Wales Press/Yr Academi Gymreig, 1985. ISBN 0708309119.
- Goronwy Wyn Owen, Rhwng Calfin a Böhme: Golwg ar Syniadaeth Morgan Llwyd. Cardiff: University of Wales Press, 2001. ISBN 0708317022.
- L. J. Parry, "The Book of the Three Birds". Transactions of the National Eisteddfod of Wales, Llandudno, 1896. Edited by E. Vincent Evans. Liverpool: I. Foulkes/National Eisteddfod Association, 1896.
- Meic Stephens, The Oxford Companion to the Literature of Wales. Oxford: Oxford University Press/Yr Academi Gymreig, 1986. ISBN 9780192115867.
- M. Wynn Thomas, Morgan Llwyd. Cardiff: University of Wales Press, 1984. ISBN 0-7083-0873-2.
