= Malpezzi =

Malpezzi is an Italian surname. Notable people with the surname include:

- Donna Malpezzi, American lawyer
- Simona Malpezzi (born 1972), Italian politician

== See also ==
- Malvezzi
