= Malvezzi =

Malvezzi is an Italian surname. Members of an aristocratic family from Bologna

== Members of an aristocratic family from Bologna ==
- Annibale Malvezzi: Condottieri for Venetian armies, circa 1480
- Virgilio Malvezzi: (1595–1654) historian and essayist, soldier and diplomat
- Giovanni Luigi Malvezzi de’ Medici (1819-1892) politician, patriot, and Italian scholar.

The Malvezzi of Bologna were owners of prominent buildings in Bologna and surroundings, including:

- Palazzo Malvezzi-Lupari, Bologna
- Palazzo Malvezzi-Medici, Bologna
- Palazzo Malvezzi-Campeggi, Bologna
- Palazzo Malvezzi-Leoni, Bologna
- Palazzo Malvezzi-Hercolani at Castelguelfo
- Teatro Malvezzi, Bologna : Opera house built in 1651, burned down in 1745
- Rocca Malvezzi-Campeggi: medieval castle in Dozza

== Other ==
- Cristofano Malvezzi (1547 – 1599) born Lucca, active in Florence as organist and composer
- Jacopo Malvezzi (died c. 1432): doctor and historiographer of Brescia

== See also ==
- Malpezzi
