= Baltasar Alamos de Barrientos =

Spanish scholar (1555–1640)

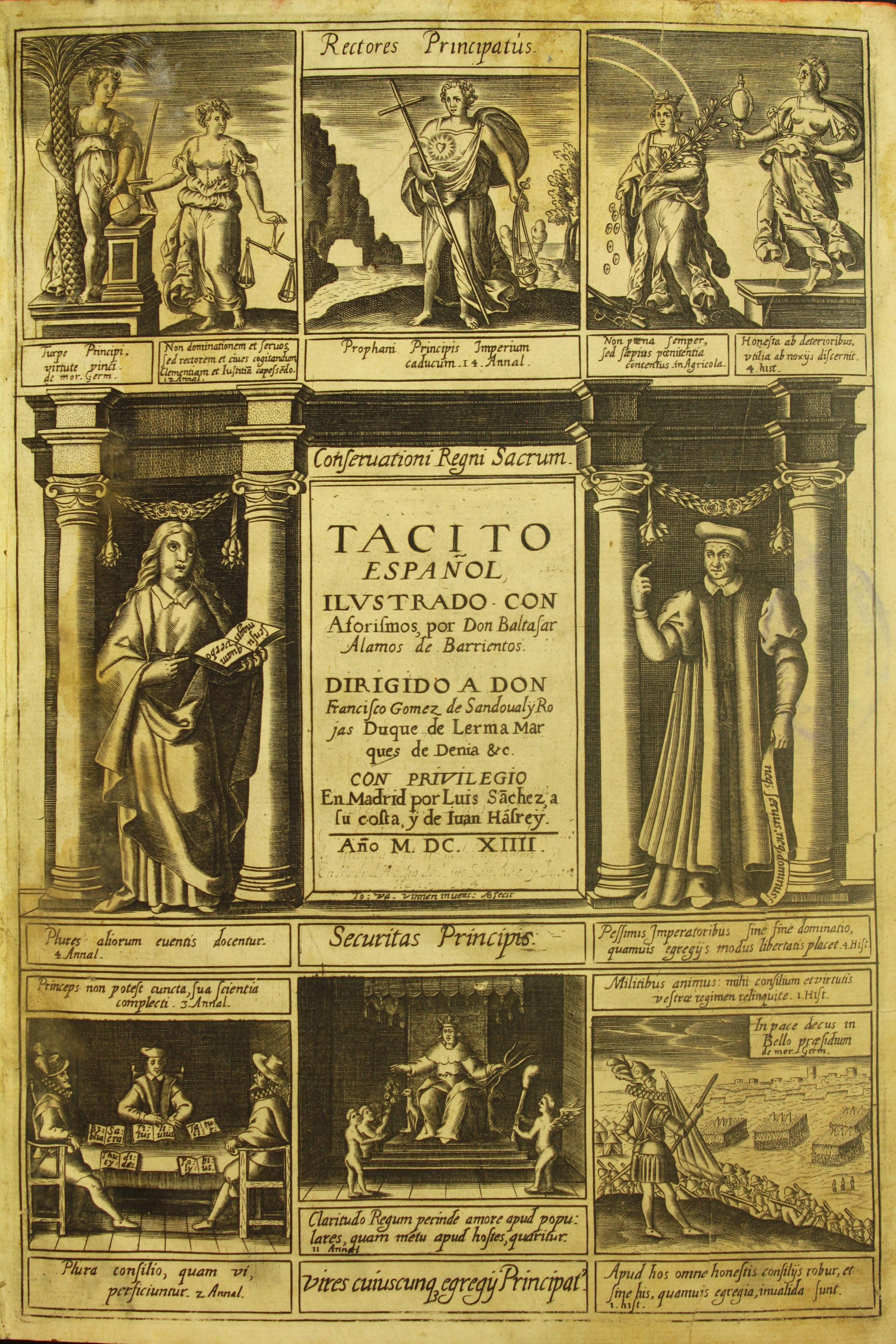
Tácito español ilustrado con aforismos, Madrid, Luis Sánchez, 1614

Baltasar Alamos de Barrientos (1555–1640), Spanish scholar, was born at Medina del Campo, a town in Valladolid province. His friendship with Antonio Pérez caused him to be arrested in 1590 and imprisoned for nearly thirteen years. His Tácito Español illustrado con aforismos (Madrid, 1614) is the only work which bears his name, but he is probably the author of the Discurso del gobierno ascribed to Pérez. Through the influence of the Duke of Lerma (to whom the Tácito is dedicated) and of the Count-Duke of Olivares, he subsequently attained high official position.

== Biography ==
Baltasar Alamos de Barrientos was born at Medina del Campo, in Old Castile, about the middle of the sixteenth century, and studied law at the University of Salamanca. He contracted a warm friendship with Gonzalo Pérez, secretary of state to Philip II, and afterwards with the minister’s son Antonio, who succeeded him in the same position. The disgrace of Antonio Pérez brought ruin on Alamos, who was imprisoned for twelve years in consequence of the unfortunate connection. In 1598 Philip II died, leaving directions in his will that Alamos should be released; and in the succeeding reign, though not employed, he was looked on with favour by the ministers, especially the Duke of Lerma, who supplied him with the means of subsistence. On the accession of Philip IV, through the influence of the Count-Duke Olivarez, who highly esteemed his talents, he obtained several valuable places about the court, and was ultimately made a member of the councils of the Indies and of the royal patrimony. He died at the advanced age of eighty-eight, leaving behind him several daughters, one of whom was married to Don García Tello de Sandoval, himself a writer of some celebrity.

Alamos is known by his translation of Tacitus, which he originally undertook to relieve the tedium of imprisonment. It is the most complete version of the author extant in the Spanish language. The principal portions were executed entirely in prison, as appears from Philip II having granted a license for their publication in 1594, four years before Alamos was released; but the translations of Tacitus's Germania and Agricola were the fruits of his labours when at large. The whole appeared in one vol. 4to at Madrid, under the title of El Tacito Español illustrado con Aforismos in the year 1614. Alamos' translation, based upon Justus Lipsius' edition of Tacitus, is accompanied in the margins by a series of his own aphorisms encapsulating the point made by Tacitus in the text. These latter were afterwards published by Don Antonio de Fuertes under the title of Alma o aphorismos de Cornelio Tacito, Antwerp, 1651, 8vo. Alamos' aphorisms were also translated into Italian by Girolamo d'Anghiari, and published with Adriano Politi's version of Tacitus, Venice, 1665 4to. John Nichols claimed that Thomas Gordon's commentaries on Tacitus were derivative from the work of Virgilio Malvezzi, Scipione Ammirato and Baltasar Alamos de Barrientos.
