= Thomas Powell (rector of Cantref) =

Welsh cleric and writer (c.1608–1660)

Thomas Powell (c. 1608 – 31 December 1660) was a Welsh cleric and writer.

== Life ==
Powell was born in about 1608 Cantref, Breconshire, Wales where his father (John Powell) was the rector from 1601 to 1626. He attended Jesus College, Oxford, matriculating in 1628. He was awarded a BA degree in 1629, with further degrees of MA in 1632 and DD in 1660. He became rector of Cantref in May 1635, having been appointed by his elder brother Hugh, who was the patron. During the English Commonwealth, in 1650, he lost this position and went abroad in exile. In 1654, he sought permission to preach from Jenkin Jones, one of those empowered by Parliament to approve such requests in Wales. He was finally restored to his parish in 1660 and became a canon of St David's Cathedral. He died on 31 December 1660 and is buried in St Dunstan-in-the-West, London. He was said to have been nominated as Bishop of Bristol before his death.

== Works ==
His writings included a translation from the Italian of Stoa Triumphans: or Two Sober Paradoxes, I. The Praise of Banishment, II. The Dispraise of Honors by Virgilio Malvezzi (1651) and a Welsh book, Cerbyd Iechydwriaeth (1657). Other manuscript works, including Fragmenta de Rebus Britannicis, A Short Account of the Lives, Manners, and Religion of the British Druids and Bards, were left in his will to his friend Henry Vaughan.
