= St Mary's Church, Cardiff =

Former church in Cardiff, Wales

Coordinates: 51.4775°N 3.1779°W

St Mary's Church
- Welsh: Eglwys Fair
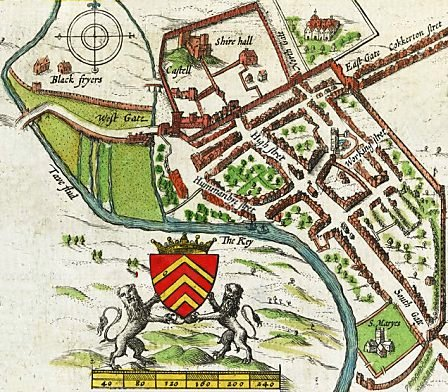
- John Speed's 1610 map of Cardiff, showing the southerly location of St Mary's Church, next to the River Taff.
- St Mary's Church
- Location: Cardiff
- Country: Wales
- Previous denomination: Anglican

History
- Status: Church (former)
- Founded: 1107

Architecture
- Functional status: Abandoned (c. 1701); Demolished
- Closed: c. 1701
- Demolished: 1701 (Ruins)

St Mary's Church (Welsh: Eglwys Fair) was an Anglican church in Cardiff, Wales, which stood at the south end of the current St. Mary's Street, from 1107 until 1620. After severe flood damage it was abandoned in 1701 and later replaced at a different location in 1843.

== Early history ==
St Mary's was founded as a Benedictine priory in the 1080s, by Robert Fitzhamon (also founder of Tewkesbury Abbey in 1092). However, the site next to the River Taff was a poor one, susceptible to both continual flooding and river erosion. Even after stabilising the foundations, bodies from burials would regularly be washed down the river. The abbey withdrew the monks in 1211.

== Destruction ==
In 1607, the area of England and Wales bordering the Bristol Channel experienced a devastating flood. The flood has been at various later times been attributed to a storm surge or a tsunami. The Bristol Channel floods washed away much of St Mary's foundations and it slowly began to collapse.

In 1620, the decision was made to make St John's the main parish church, which was originally just a chapel of ease. The two churches were worked as one parish, with all burials and some services continuing at St Mary's.

In 1638, the vicar of St Mary's, William Erbery, was forced to resign, his curate Walter Cradock had his licence revoked, and senior members of the congregation were barred from the premises after they refused to read the Book of Sports. These people, together with others of a similar mind, formed the core of a new congregation that, after the English Civil War and subsequent Restoration, in 1696 were granted land in Womanby Street which allowed them to build the first Trinity Church (later known as a Presbyterian chapel).

By 1678, with evidence from the visit of Francis Place and later essays from the Celtic scholar Edward Lhuyd, both described St Mary's as being in ruins. The tower collapsed in 1680 and the last recorded burial in the churchyard took place in 1698. The last service was held in a roofless ruin in 1701, after which St Mary's was abandoned.

== Replacement and later developments ==
In 1843, John Crichton-Stuart, 2nd Marquess of Bute donated the land for the construction of the Church of St. Mary the Virgin (the present Church of St Mary and St Stephen) in Bute Street as a permanent replacement. The cost of construction, however, was met by public appeal for funds. The 1843 church was designed by Thomas Foster of Bristol. The east end (by J. D. Sedding) was added in 1884, later enlarged in 1907. Wall paintings decorate the chancel arch. The church is a Grade II listed building.

The River Taff was diverted in 1850 (by Isambard Kingdom Brunel) to create a site to build the Cardiff Central railway station, also resulting in the creation of Westgate Street.

The Theatre Royal (later the Prince of Wales theatre) was built on the site of the old church in 1878. This is now the location of the current Prince of Wales public house. The outline of a Gothic church was included on one wall of the theatre, denoting its location on the St Mary's church site.

== Gallery ==
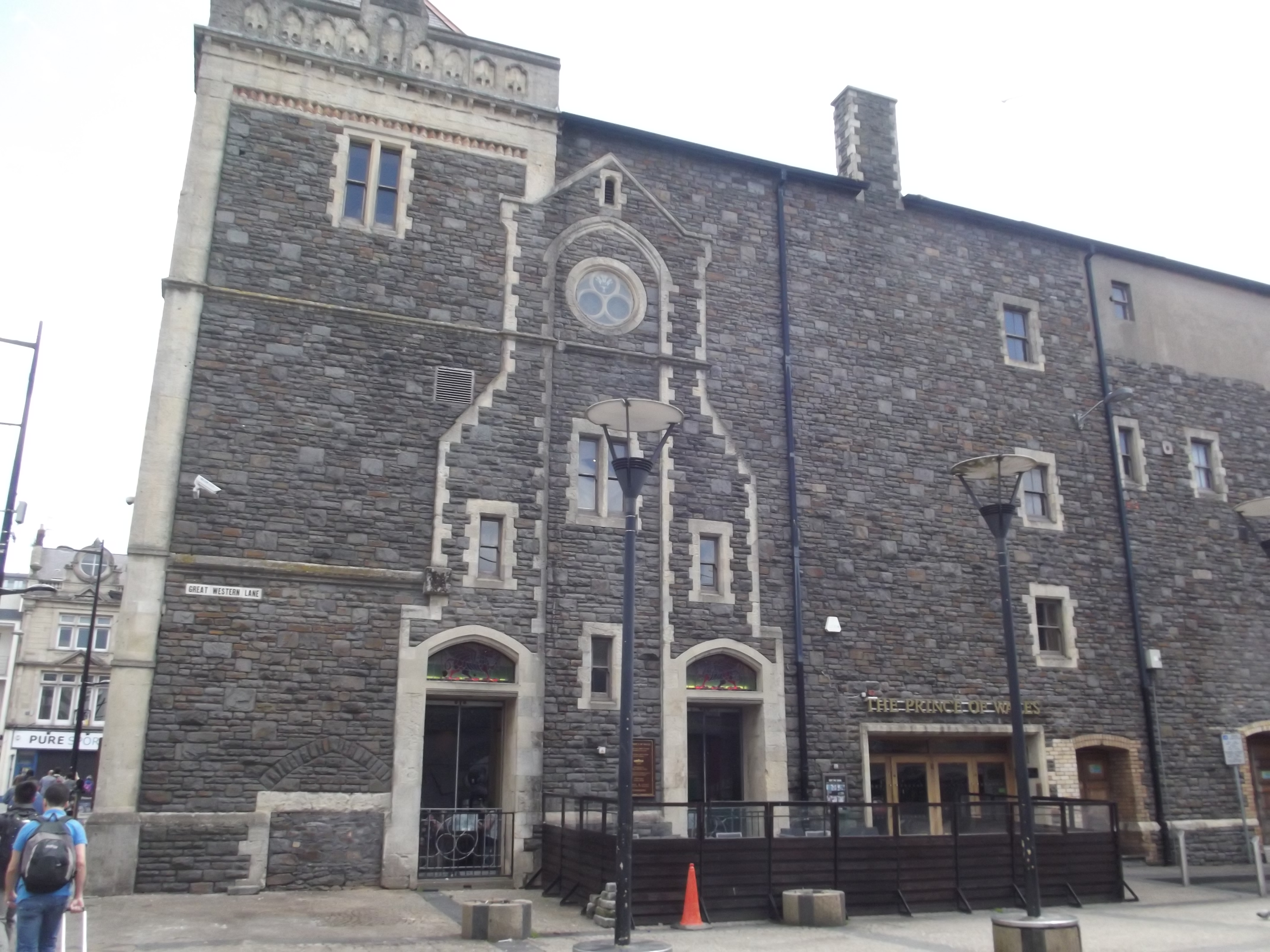
The outline of a Gothic church on The Prince of Wales pub, which gives a nod to the nearby site of St Mary's

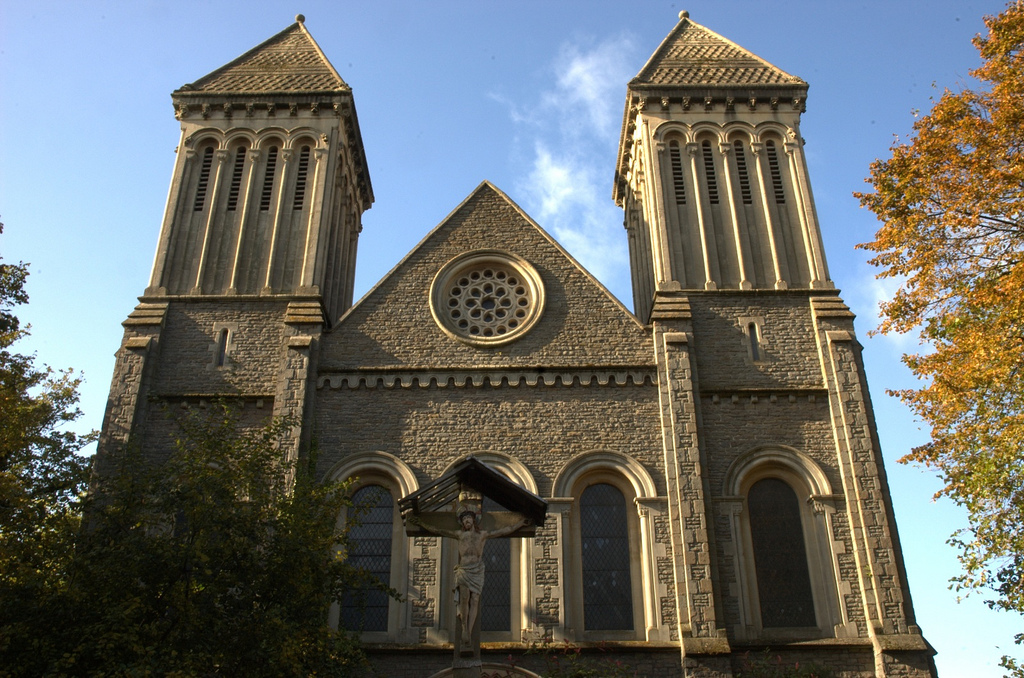
Church of St Mary and St Stephen, Bute Street

== See also ==
- History of Cardiff
