= William Erbery =

Welsh theologian (1604–1654)

William Erbery or Erbury (1604 – April 1654) was a Welsh clergyman and radical Independent theologian. He was the father of the militant Quaker Dorcas Erbery.

== Life ==
Erbery was born in Roath, Cardiff. He graduated from Brasenose College, Oxford, England in 1623.

He was ejected in 1638 from his Cardiff parish of St Mary's, under the Bishop of Llandaff who had branded him a schismatic, after several citations before the Court of High Commission. His offence was refusing, along with fellow Dissenters Walter Craddock and William Wroth, to read the Book of Sports. He became chaplain, when the English Civil War broke out in 1642, to the regiment of Philip Skippon in the Parliamentary Army. According to Christopher Hill.

William Erbery, near-Ranter, used the familiar concept of Adam as a public personality representing all mankind to argue that the New Model Army was 'the Army of God, as public persons', representing the people.

From there he retired to the Isle of Ely. He was a Seeker; in Ely he expanded the Seekers in the 1640s.

He expected that a regime of 'saints' would (in the later 1640s) carry out God's will in England. He looked to the Army and Cromwell for reforms such as the abolition of tithes and the state church. In 1646 he took part in a high-profile dispute with the orthodox Presbyterian and heresy watchdog Francis Cheynell.

Anthony Wood (1632–1695), the English antiquary, records that Erbery died in London in April 1654 and was buried at either "Ch. Church" or the "Cemiterie joyning to Old Bedlam near London".

== Views ==
With a disillusioned attitude to the movement of the times, though accepting Cromwell's Protectorate, he was a suspected Ranter.

He favoured broad religious tolerance, and was dismissive of churches, believing that 'apostasy' had set in early in Christian times; and criticized much even in the Independent churches of his time. He attacked the assumption of the sufficiency of scripture, but doubted the Trinity had Biblical support. He believed free grace had been brought forth by John Preston and Richard Sibbes, preached universal redemption, and denied the divinity of Christ. His millennarian views included a Second Coming, but realised by and within 'saints'.

He opposed the Baptists, for example in his 1653 pamphlet A Mad Man's Plea.

== Private life ==
William married Mary who survived him. Their children included the Quaker preacher Dorcas Erbery. After William's death, Mary and Dorcas were involved in a show in Bristol with Martha Simmonds and Hannah Stranger that resulted in James Naylor being tried for blasphemy.
