= Rowland Vaughan =

Rowland Vaughan (1559–1629) was an English manorial lord who is credited with the introduction of a new irrigation system that greatly improved the grass and hay production of meadows through a system of periodic "drownings". This method so improved grass production that lands formerly needed to provide livestock with food during the winter could be given over to grazing or cereal production. It was one of the many new methods introduced during the British Agricultural Revolution that increased crop yields and allowed for the development of large cities.

== Early life ==
Rowland Vaughan was the second son of Watkyn Vaughan of Bredwardine, Herefordshire. The Vaughan family was closely entwined with another local family, the Parrys, with numerous inter-marriages. It was through the contact of his great-aunt, Blanche Parry, that Rowland came to spend some time in the court of Queen Elizabeth I of England, Blanche being one of the queen's longest-serving women. However Rowland complained of the 'bitternesse' of Blanche's 'humor'.

Rowland left court to join the military, leaving for the Nine Years' War in Ireland. Here the combination of bad food and wet weather invalided him from the Army, and he returned to Bredwardine. He recovered in six months and was planning to take to the field again, but met a 'country-gentlewoman' (another Parry) who had inherited a local manor, Newcourt, and married her. Rowland also inherited an adjoining estate, Whitehouse in Turnastone. The combined estates stretched along the Golden Valley, on the west bank of the River Dore, from Peterchurch to Bacton.

== Irrigation scheme ==
After two years, "I began to expostulate with myself what was best to be done to preserve my reputation with my martiall companions, and with-all to give contentment to my vertuous and loving wife". His wife asked that he take to walking the estates, especially to check up on the miller who ran the water mill on her land. Millers were long considered the least honest workmen, and Rowland was less than impressed with the duty, complaining it "therefore requires the more paines to be taken in watching their water, & looking to their fingers." Nevertheless, he took her advice, "lest shee should have held me careless of her good, and so ill deserve her love."

It was during one of these walks that Rowland noticed a molehill that had been dug into a local stream such that water from the stream exited the bottom of the molehill. He noticed that the grass under the stream was considerably more lush than the grass around it. He set about attempting to duplicate the system on the Golden Valley properties. The work took twenty years, from about 1584 to 1604. The main component was a three-mile (5 km) long artificial channel leading from the Dore at Peterchurch, running alongside it, and finally back into the Dore at Abbey Dore. The result was a large plot of land between the Dore and the trench that could be flooded. The "Trench Royal", as he called it, was 16 feet (4.9 m) wide and 8 feet (2.4 m) deep for the first half-mile, and then 10 feet (3.0 m) wide and 4 feet (1.2 m) deep for the rest. A sluicegate at the downstream exit controlled the flow of water into the fields; closing it would flood the fields, opening it allowed the water to drain off again. The use of flooding increased the yearly value of the land from £40 to £300 per year.

Six years later, in 1610 Rowland published a book describing the system, Most Approved and Long experienced Water Workes containing The manner of Winter and Summer drowning. In it he claimed that the Trench Royal was navigable, and was being used to ship goods from one end of the estate to the other. The book also claimed they built up the area, including a mill and up to 2,000 workers. If these accounts are true, no trace of their houses remains.

An account was also published describing a similar system in the Wylye Valley in Wiltshire, but the name of the author is lost to history. It has more recently been shown that Vaughan's system was the duplicate of a system used throughout Europe as early as the 13th century, and it is now believed that his primarily role was to popularise the system in England, at least in hindsight.

The Turnastone fields were purchased in January 2003 by the Countryside Restoration Trust to save the meadows from being turned into a potato farm. The fields have remained unploughed for four hundred years, and the sale of the land for farming would have destroyed this history. Although they are no longer filled with water, the irrigation system, including the Trench Royal, are still obvious features of the plot.
