= Samuel Jones (nonconformist) =

Samuel Jones (1628 – September 1697) was a Welsh nonconformist clergyman, who established an academy for educating dissenting ministers.

== Life ==
Jones was born in Denbighshire, Wales, near Chirk Castle, in 1628. He matriculated at All Souls College, Oxford in 1647, but transferred to Merton College before May 1648, when he appeared before the parliamentary visitors and was expelled from Oxford University for refusing to accept their authority. However, the decision was later reversed when Jones submitted (and possibly with the intervention of Sir Thomas Myddleton, who was Jones's patron) and Jesus College was ordered to admit Jones as a scholar in November 1648. He obtained a B.A. degree in 1652 and was made a Fellow of Jesus College in 1653. He was awarded his M.A. in 1654. However, his puritanical beliefs became stronger and he resigned his fellowship in 1656. After being ordained by the presbyterians in Taunton, he became vicar of Llangynwyd, Glamorgan in 1657, remaining in post for five years. In about 1660, he married and moved to Brynllywarch in Llangynwyd parish (at 51.5744°N 3.6255°W), where he remained until his death.

The Act of Uniformity made Jones's position intolerable and he resigned his position in 1662. He declined an offer from the Bishop of Llandaff of another position if Jones were to conform. Instead, he obtained a licence to preach under the Declaration of Indulgence of 1672, preaching at his own home and elsewhere. His good connections with local men of influence meant that he suffered relatively little. He established an academy in Brynllywarch to educate dissenting ministers, drawing good candidates given his academic reputation. The academy was later regarded as being the first dissenting academy in Wales, and its first "university" of sorts. Jones died in September 1697, and was buried on 10 September 1697 in Llangynwyd churchyard. His second wife, and three of his fourteen children, outlived him.
