= Richard Jones (priest, born 1603) =

Richard Jones (1603 – 1655 or 1656) was a Welsh Anglican priest and writer.

Jones, from north Wales, was educated at Jesus College, Oxford, where he obtained a BA degree in 1626 and his MA in 1628. He was ordained as an Anglican priest and became vicar of Llanfair Caereinion, Montgomeryshire, Wales in 1636. In 1650, during the English Commonwealth, he was deprived of this position by the Council for the Propagation of the Gospel in Wales, although he continued to work in the parish. He also published two summaries of the Bible in free metric form: Testun Testament Newydd ein Harglwydd … yn Benhillion Cymraeg (1653) and Perl y Cymro neu Cofiadur y Beibl ar fesurau Psalmau Dafydd (1655). He died in late 1655 or early 1656.
