= Francis Davies (bishop) =

Welsh bishop (1605–1675)

Francis Davies (14 March 1605 – 14 March 1675) was a Welsh clergyman who was Bishop of Llandaff from 1667 until his death.

== Life ==
Davies was born in Glamorgan, Wales and educated at Jesus College, Oxford, matriculating in November 1621. He was awarded his BA in 1625, his MA in 1628 and a BD degree in 1640. He is also said to have become a Fellow of Jesus College before taking his BD degree, but he is not included in the list of fellows in Ernest Hardy's history of the college. He took the degree of DD in 1661. After being ordained, he was rector of Pentyrch and Radyr in Glamorgan (1630 onwards), and of Llangan with Llantrithyd (1638 onwards), surrendering Llantrithyd soon after becoming a prebendary of Llandaff Cathedral in 1639. His opposition to church reforms led to his losing his parishes at some point between 1646 and 1650, although he received some concessions such as payment of some tithes to him or his brothers. He supplemented his income by running a school and, later, moving to London to become chaplain to the wife of the royalist Henry Mordaunt, 2nd Earl of Peterborough.

After the Restoration of Charles II, Davies became Archdeacon of Llandaff in 1660, and Bishop of Llandaff in 1667. Whilst bishop, he restored the cathedral library and installed the largest bell in the bell-tower. Having never married, he left his small estate to his brother, other relations and his servants. He died on his seventieth birthday in 1675 and was buried in front of the cathedral altar. His gravestone was found after the cathedral was bombed in 1941 during the Second World War.
