= Henry Jessey =

English scholar and minister

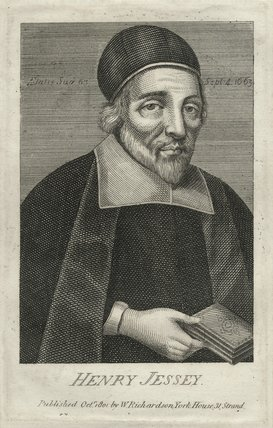
- Born: West Rowton
- Died: London
- Occupations: Clergyman, Scholar
- Years active: 1618 - 1663
- Known for: Philosemitism
- Notable work: The Glory of Iehudah and Israel and An Information Concerning the Present State of the Jewish Nation in Europe and Judea

Henry Jessey (1603 – 1663) was an English Puritan Nonconformist minister and scholar. He was a founding member of the Puritan religious sect, the Jacobites. Jessey was considered a Hebrew and a rabbinical scholar. His active philosemitism has led him to be described as "among Israel's greatest seventeenth-century benefactors."

== Life ==
Henry Jessey was born on 1603 in West Rowton, Yorkshire. Jessey attended the University of Cambridge from 1618–24; he was at St. John's College, Cambridge in 1622, B. A. (1623). He was ordained as an Anglican priest in 1627. He was vicar of Assington, or simply resident in the family of Brampton Gurdon and then visited New England. He was vicar of Aughton, East Riding of Yorkshire from 1633; but was deprived of his living in 1634. He was then supported by Sir Matthew Boynton, who found him places to preach.

Henry Jacob had formed a non-separating Puritan faction of former Church of England members. They were Calvinist in theological practise. Contemporary scholars refer to them as: Independents, Brownist, semi-Separatist, or Puritans. John Lothropp picked up Jacob's London congregation after his death; Jessey took over, from 1637.

The church faced hostility from the authorities, and migrated to Southwark where Jessey became a preacher at St George the Martyr Church and then under Cromwell, it is claimed, rector. He travelled in November 1639 to set up with William Wroth, an Independent church at Llanfaches, Monmouthshire. He was imprisoned, with members of his congregation, in August 1641. He became a Baptist in 1645, under the influence of Hanserd Knollys.

Henry Jessey also observed the seventh-day Sabbath, although he was somewhat reluctant to promulgate his views on the subject. However, in 1647 he argued that the seventh-day was "[Christ's] Sabbath which he blessed and sanctified. It has been suggested that he may have authored the anonymous "Moralitie of the Fourth Commandment" (1652). In his posthumous work, Miscellanea Sacra, or Diverse Necessary Truths (1665) Jessey asserted that believing Christians "should have respect to all the Ten Commandments of the Law." Jessey's biographer records that he kept the Sabbath in his own chamber, with only four or five more of the same mind after being convinced that the seventh day should be kept by Christians evangelically. Jessey's itinerary throughout western England contributed to the beginnings of several Sabbatarian groups.

The church developed within the Particular Baptists:

Led by Henry Jacob of the Brownists from Zealand, these Particular Baptists in 1633 started a new church under John Spilsbury. Five years later William Kiffin and others of Jacob's church at Southwark joined Spilsbury and divided equally in two parts under Praise-God Barebone and Henry Jessey. From Jessey's church, Hanserd Knollys in 1644 began his own congregation. These Particulars had no communication with the General Baptists.

There have been some questions raised about the documentary evidence, the Stinton Repository attributed to Benjamin Stinton.

The following summary indicates briefly what the Stinton Repository relates. In 1616 Henry Jacob organized at Southwark the oldest Independent church in England and served as pastor until 1622. He thereupon resigned and traveled to Virginia where he died in 1624. John Lathrop succeeded Jacob as pastor in 1625, but he was imprisoned in 1632. After his release, he and thirty members fled to New England. Two ministers, Praise-God Barebone and Henry Jessey, stayed behind with the majority of the congregation. In 1637 Jessey succeeded Lathrop as pastor. Having accepted believer's baptism, he was eventually baptized by Hanserd Knollys.

In 1650, Jessey wrote The Glory of Iehudah and Israel in which he extolled the nobility of the Jews and proposed the reconciliation of Christianity and Judaism. He then played a moderating role among the political millenarians in the two years before the Whitehall Conference.

Jessey was buried in the New Churchyard, Bethlem, London, on the 8 September 1663.

== The Whitehall Conference ==
He wrote an account of the 1655 conference at Whitehall, at which Manasseh ben Israel put a case to the Parliamentary government of Oliver Cromwell, to lift the restrictions on Jews living in England. He was in correspondence with Manasseh, was an enthusiastic student of Hebrew and Aramaic and philo-Semite. In lobbying for the rights of the Jews to official readmission to the country, and in high expectations from this, Jessey was an associate of John Dury and Nathaniel Holmes. In 1658 Jessey composed a work entitled An Information Concerning the Present State of the Jewish Nation in Europe and Judea. He both advocated the conversion of the Jews and treating them with kindness, and believed God's special concern for them. The pamphlet also expresses concern for the trials of the Jews in Palestine, specifically the suffering from the lack of donations following the Khmelnytsky Uprising which had led to a decrease in the Jewish population in Eastern Europe and a subsequent loss of donations. As well as raising money for the impoverished Jews of Palestine, Jessey was also well acquainted with two of the key figures disseminating information throughout Europe about the Jewish millenarian prophet Sabbatai Zevi.

== Bibliography ==
=== Primary sources ===
- Ames, William 1576-1633. The relation of church and state [n.d.], in The Reformation of the Church, Murray, I. H. (ed.) [1965]
- ______. De Conscientia et ejus vel casibus (1630)
- ______. Conscience with the power and cases thereof. (Tr. out of Latine) (1639) [STC 552]
- Bilson, Thomas, 1546-7?-1616. The effect of certaine sermons, touching the full redemption of mankind (1599) [STC 3064]
- ______. Perpetual government of Christes Church
- Bradshaw, William, 1571-1618. A treatise of divine worship, tending to prove that the ceremonies imposed vpon the ministers of the Gospell in England, in the present controversie, are in their vse vnlawfull (1604) [STC 3528]
- ______. A Protestation of the King's Supremacie (1605) [STC 3525]
- Cosin, Richard, 1549?-1597. Answer to the two first and principall treatises of a certain faction libel, put foorth latelie, without name of author or printer, and without approbation by authoritie, ...
- Dickinson, Edmund, 1624-1707. Delphi phoenicizantes, sive Tractatus, in quo Graecos, quicquid apud Delphos celebre erat: ... (1655) [EEb, 1641–1700; 528:19]
- Downame, George, d. 1634. Defence of the sermon preached at the consecration of the L. Bishop of Bath and Welles [1613]
- Featley, Daniel. The Dippers Dipt (1645)
- Fenner, Dudley, 1558?-1587 A counter-poyson, modestly written for the time, to make aunswere to the obiections and reproaches, wherein the aunswere to the Abstract, would disgrace the holy discipline of Christ [1584] [EEb, 1475-1460; 224:8] [STC (2nd ed.) 10770] [ESTCS101936]
- Howard, Luke., A Looking-Glass for Baptists (1672)
- Jacob, Henry, 1563-1624.
- ______. A treatise of the sufferings and victory of Christ, in then work of our redemption declaring by the Scriptures these two questions, ... (1598) [EEb, 1475–1640; 936:16][STC 14340] [ESCTS107530]
- ______. A Defence of the Chvrches and Ministry of Englande. Written in two treatises, against the reasons and objections of Maister Francis Iohnson. and others of the separation commonly called Brownists, ... (1599) [EEb, 1475–1640; 251:2][STC 14335] [ESTCS107526]
- ______. A short treatise concerning the trvenes of a pastoral calling in pastors made by prelates ... (1599)
- ______. A defence of a treatise touching the sufferings and victorie of Christ in the worke of our redemption. ... (1600) [EEb, 1475–1640; 936:15][STC (2nd ed.)14333] [ESTCS103093]
- ______. [Another. ed.] (1600) [STC 14334]
- ______. Reasons taken ovt of Gods Word and the best humane Testimonies proving a necessitie of reforming ovr churches in England ... (1603) [EEb, 1475–1640; 993:9][STC 14338] [ESTCS120955]
- ______. [Another ed.] (1909)
- ______. Principles and Foundations of the Christian Religion
- ______. A Third Humble Supplication of many faithful subjects in England falsely called Puritans directed to the King's Majesty (1605)
- ______. A Christian and Modest Offer of a Most Indifferent Conference or dispvtation, abovt the Maine and principall coutroversies betwixt the prelate, and the late silenced and deprived ministers in England (1606) [EEb, 1475–1640; 1145:3] [STC 14329] [ESTCS120767]
- ______. .To the High and mightie Prince, Iames by the grace of God, King of great Britannie, France, and Irelande ... : An Humble Supplication for Toleration and Libertie to Enjoy and Observe the Ordinances of Christ Jesus in th' administration of His Churches in Lieu of Human Constitutions (1609)
- ______. [Another ed.] (1975)
- ______. An humble Supplication for Toleration (1609)
- ______. Divine Beginnings and Institutions of Christ true Visible ... Church, (1610)
- ______. [The divine beginning of Christs church] (1610) [EEb, 1475–1640; 993:7] [STC 14336] [ESTCS101363]
- ______. A plaine and cleere Exposition of the Second Commandement (1610) [STC 14337]
- ______. A declaration and plainer opening of certaine pointes in the divine beginning of Christes true Church (1611) [STC 14331]
- ______. A declaration and plainer opening of certaine points, with a sound confirmation of some other, contained in a treatise intituled, The divine beginning and institution of Christes true visible and ministerial church (1612) [EEb, 1475–1640; 1145:4, 1549:4][STC 14332] [ESTCS102836]
- ______. An Attestation of many Learned godly, and famous Divines, lightes of religion, and pillars of the Gospell, justifying this doctrine, ... (1613) [EEb, 1475–1640; 993:5] [STC 14328] [ESTCS117858]
- ______. An Attestation of many divines that the Church-government ought to bee alwayes with the peoples free consent (1613)
- ______. [Another ed.] (1975)
- ______. Anno Domini 1616. A Confession and Protestation of the Faith of certaine Christians in England [1616] [EEb, 1475–1640; 993:6] [STC 14330] [ESCTS120216]
- ______. Kneeling in the act of eating and drinking at the Lords table is a sinne. Proved by 8 arguments printed in the yeare. 1641. (1641) [Wing (2nd ed.) J96] [Thomason Tracts; 163:E.1102(5)][ESTCR208356]
- Jessey, Henry, 1603–1663. The Scripture-almanacke, or a calculation according to the English account, and the Word of God. [1646][EEb, 1641–1700; 2380:2] [Wing (CD-ROM, 1996) A1833A] [ESTCR223971]
- ______. [Another ed.] 1650. The scripture-kalendar, used by the prophets and apostles, and by our Lord Jesus Christ [1650] [EEb, 1641–1700; 2322:4] [Wing A1835A] [ECTSR229487]
- ______. A Storehouse of Provision (1650)
- ______. Miscellanea sacra, or, Diverse necessary truths, now as seasonably published, as they were plainly and compendiously proved by Henry Jessey, late minister of the Gospel in London (1665) [EEb, 1641–1700; 1950:6] [Wing (2nd ed.) J695] [ESTCR216570]
- ______. A Looking-glass for children being a narrative of God's gracious dealings with some little children, recollectedby Henry Jessey in his lifetime [4th ed.; 1673] [EEB, 1641–1700; 2292:24] [Wing P30A] [ESTCR42778]
- ______. [Another ed.] (1709)[ESTCW38859]
- ______. "Letters to Henry Jacie", in Collections (Mass. Historical Society), 3rd ser., 1; 4th ser., 6
- Johnson, Francis, 1562-1618. An answer to Maister H. Iacob his defence of the churches and ministry of England. By Francis Johnson an exile of Iesus Christ (1600) [EEb, 1475–1640; 994:11] [STC 14658] [ESTCS121679]
- Killcop, Thomas, A short Treatise of Baptisme (1642)
- Ormerod, Oliver, 1580?-1626. The Picture of a Puritane; or a relation of the opinions a. practises of the Anabaptists in Germanie a. of the puritanes in England. Whereunto is annexed Puritano-papismus (1605) [STC 18851]
- ______. [Anr. ed.] Newly corrected and enlarged (1605) [STC 18852]
- Staresmore, Sabine (fl. 1616-1647). Unlawfullnes of Reading in Prayer (1619)

=== Secondary sources ===
- Brachlow, S., The Communion of Saints: Radical Puritan and Separatists Ecclesiology 1570-1625 (1988)
- ______. "The Elizabethan Roots of Henry Jacob's Churchmanship", Journal of Ecclesiastical History, 36 (1985)
- Dodd, J. A., "The Eschatology of Praise-God Barebone", Transactions of the Congregational Historical Society, 4 (1909–10)
- Hartle, R., The New Churchyard: from Moorfields marsh to Bethlem burial ground, Brokers Row and Liverpool Street, London:Crossrail (2017)
- Hylson-Smith, K., The Churches in England from Elizabeth I to Elizabeth II, Vol. 1, 1558-1688 (1996)
- Nuttall, G. F., Visible Saints: The Congregational Way 1640-1660 (1957)
- Paul, R. S., "Henry Jacob and Seventeenth-Century Puritanism", Hartford Quarterly, 7 (1967)
- Tolmie, M., The Triumph of the Saints, The Separate Churches of London, 1616-1649 (1977)
- ______. "The Jacob Church", in The Triumph of the Saints, The Separate Churches of London, 1616-1649 (1977)
- von Rohr, J., "The Congregationalism of Henry Jacob", Transactions of the Congregational Historical Society, 19 (1962)
- ______. "Extra Ecclesiam Nulla Salus: An Early Congregational Version", Church History, 36 (1967)
- White, B. R., "How did William Kiffin join the Baptist?", Baptist Quarterly, 23
- ______. "Samuel Eaton (d. 1639), Particular Baptist Pioneer", Baptist Quarterly, 24
- Whitley, W. T., "Debate of Infant Baptism, 1643", Transactions of the Baptist Historical Society, 1 (1908–09)
- ______. "The Jacob-Jessey Church, 1616-1678", Transactions of the Baptist Historical Society, 1 (1908–09)
- ______."Records of the Jacob-Lathrop-Jessey Church, 1616-1641", Transactions of the Baptist Historical Society 1, (1908–09)
- ______. 'Rise of the Particular Baptists in London, 1633–1644, Transactions of the Baptist Historical Society 1, (1908–09)
