= Rhys Cadwaladr =

Welsh poet and academic

Rhys Cadwaladr (fl. 1666–1690) was a Welsh language poet and classical scholar, born in Conwy, north Wales.
