= David Edwardes (deputy herald) =

David Edwardes (c. 1630 – 1690) was a member of the Edwardes family of Rhydygors Carmarthen. He was appointed a deputy herald by the Clarenceux King of Arms. He died without issue.

He married Elizabeth, daughter of David Morgan of Coed Llwyd, Pembrokeshire. He was the deputy herald for Cardiganshire, Brecknock, Pembrokeshire, Carmarthenshire and Glamorgan. He compiled large genealogical volumes and he was an armorist. He was consulted by contemporary British and Continental genealogists. His will was proved in Carmarthen in November 1690. William Lewes of Llwynderw acquired his collections after his death.
