= Thomas Floyd =

Welsh writer

Thomas Floyd (fl. 1589–1603) was a Welsh writer at the turn of the 16th and 17th centuries.

== Life ==
Floyd entered New Inn Hall, Oxford, in 1589 and graduated with a BA degree in 1593; he later transferred to Jesus College, Oxford and took his MA degree in 1596 and BCL degree in 1599. He wrote The picture of a perfit common wealth, describing as well the offices of princes and inferior magistrates over their subjects, as also the duties of subjects towards their governors (1600), a study which concluded that monarchy was the best form of government. It was dedicated to Sir Thomas Egerton, the Lord Keeper. He also wrote some verses in Latin for the 1603 work Academiae Oxoniensis Pietas erga serenissimum … Jacobum … Regem.
