= Thomas Phillips (engineer) =

British naval officer and engineer

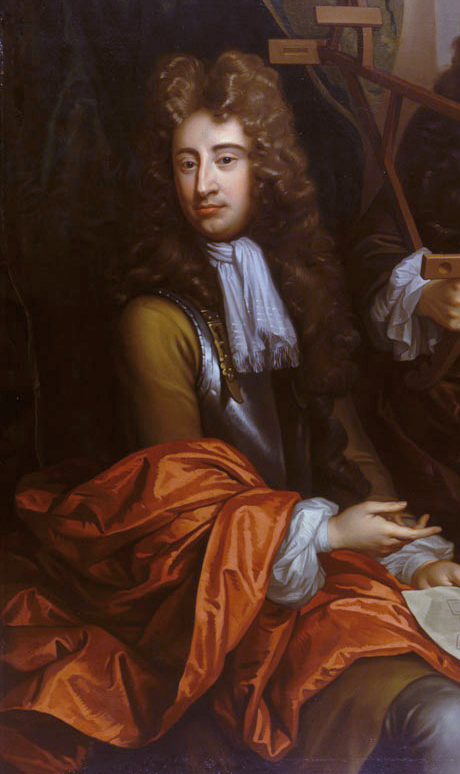
- c. 1692 portrait of Phillips
- Died: 22 November 1693; Aboard HMS Norwich at Guernsey Road in the Channel Islands
- Military career
- Allegiance: Kingdom of England
- Branch: Royal Navy
- Service years: 1661? – 1693
- Rank: Second Engineer of the Ordnance

Thomas Phillips (died 22 November 1693) was a Royal Navy officer and engineer who worked with some of the leading naval figures of his period, and was involved in military operations against the French during the Nine Years' War.

== Early years ==
Little is known about Phillips's origins and background, though his parents may have been Welsh. He is first recorded in 1661, when he was appointed as master gunner of HMS Portsmouth. He rose further, passing an examination by the master gunner of England in 1672 and becoming a gunner in the Tower of London. The following year in 1673, he was back with the Royal Navy during the closing stages of the First Anglo-Dutch War, serving under Admiral Edward Spragge. He was commissioned an ensign in the company of the governor of Portsmouth, George Legge. During this period, he became an expert on bombardment and fortification and achieved recognition of his abilities as a military engineer. He was dispatched to the Channel Islands in 1679–80, where he surveyed and drew up plans of the Islands from a tactical perspective.

== Overseas service ==
Still with Legge, by now Lord Dartmouth, Phillips joined him in an expedition to destroy the fortifications and mole at Tangier in 1683. He dutifully recorded the expedition's success in a series of drawings. During this time, he fell in with Samuel Pepys, who had also accompanied the expedition. Pepys recorded that Phillips had 'views on many topics, including the improvement of navigation skills, the need to study the world's currents, the importance of mathematics in the educational curriculum of children intended for careers at sea, the simplification of the rigging of ships, and the needlessness of discovering the means of calculating longitude, which he believed would only bring about miscarriages at sea.'

Phillips returned to England in April 1684, and by July had been appointed third engineer of the ordnance. He visited France in the summer of 1684. Whilst in Luxembourg he met fellow military engineer and expert in fortifications, Vauban. He also took the opportunity to view frontier fortifications on the Rhine and at the channel ports. He reported back to his patron Dartmouth that he had 'taken particular observations of all things that can in any way be serviceable to us, especially in the affairs of the artillery' Having gained valuable knowledge of the continental styles of fortification, Phillips was ordered to inspect the defences of Portsmouth, design and prepare any new works he thought necessary, and then oversee their construction. A further commission came in August that year, when he was sent to Ireland by the Duke of Ormonde to carry out a survey of the existing harbours and their fortifications, draw up plans of their designs and give advice on repairs. He issued his report in 1685, in which he criticised the existing defences and made recommendations for improvements costing some £554,000.

For his surveys, he drew up meticulous plans of key strategic locations. He drafted a report entitled 'Rules, orders and directions for regulating the office of ordnance in Ireland' and together with Francis Povey carried out a survey of the ordnance and arms remaining in the king's stores in Ireland. He subsequently advised the building of new storehouses. The reports were presented to King James II, who referred to matter to the Irish administration in 1686. The immense cost that would have been involved in implementing Phillips' proposals meant that little was done about them however, and he returned to England in the summer of 1685. His departure was lamented by the former master-general of the Irish ordnance the Earl of Longford, who wrote to Lord Dartmouth praising the character and conduct of 'Honest Tom Phillips' Phillips also carried out a number of paintings of Irish towns and harbours in a variety of mediums including pencil, pen and ink, and colourwash. They are significant in showing the influence of Dutch landscapists then at work in England, as well as being a useful topographical record of Irish towns in the late seventeenth century.

== Fall from grace and subsequent return ==
Having received good references from his patrons, Phillips was appointed second engineer in December 1685, a post with an annual salary of £250. He was based at the Board of Ordnance in London but toured the Navy bases and strategic harbours, such as Poole, Portsmouth, Plymouth, Chatham, and Sheerness to inspect and advise on the defences. He erected a fort on Hounslow Heath in 1687 for the army's summer exercises, and in December was commissioned captain of the company of miners in Lord Dartmouth's ordnance regiment. Phillips was in Portsmouth during the Glorious Revolution in November 1688, and wrote to Dartmouth to report on the strength of the Dutch fleet which had brought William of Orange to Torbay.

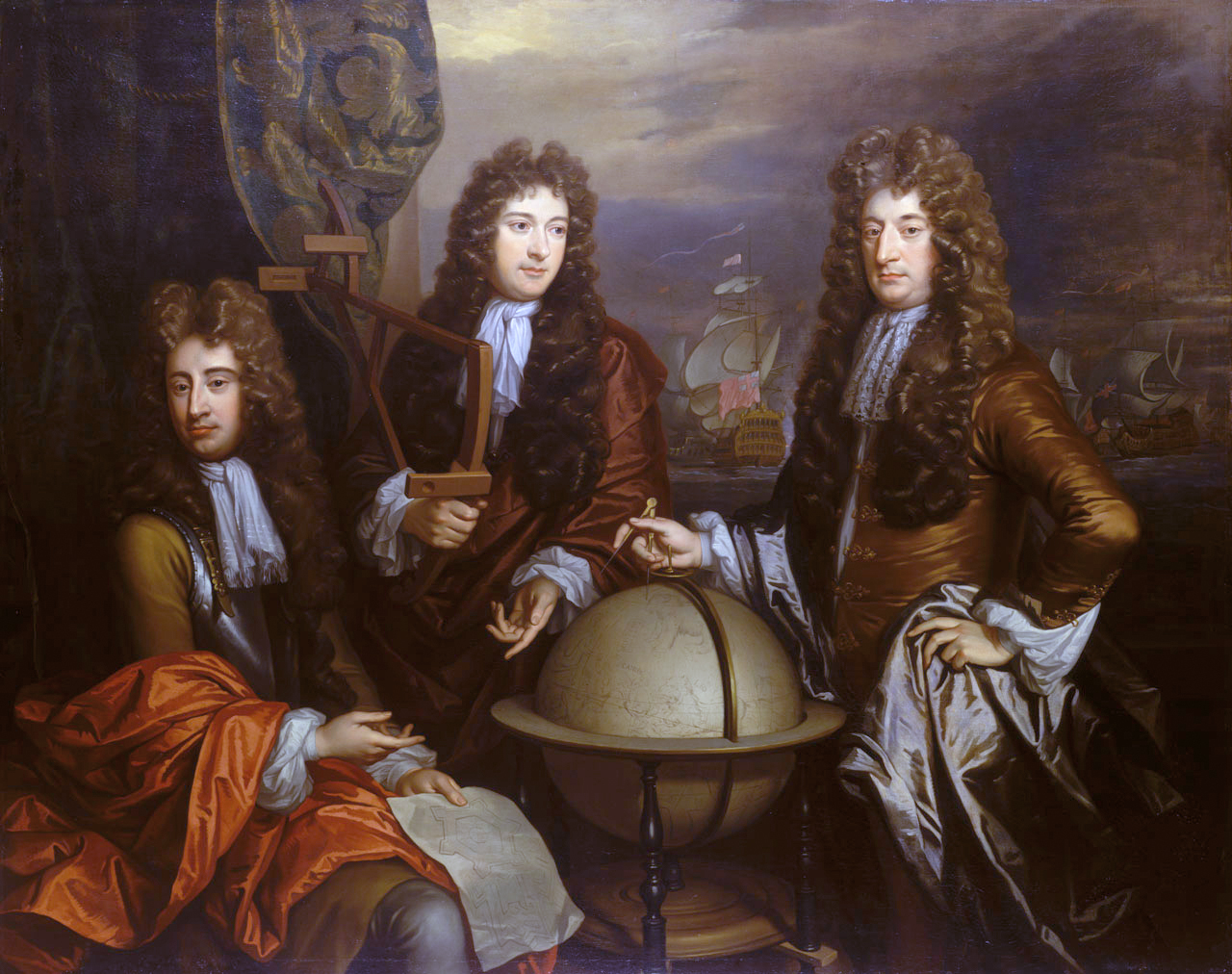
Murray's full portrait. Alongside Phillips (left) are John Benbow (centre) and Sir Ralph Delaval (right). The three had been important figures in British fleet operations against the north coast of France during 1692–93.

The revolution caused his patron, Lord Dartmouth, to fall from power and perhaps out of bitterness, Phillips refused to go to Ireland in 1689 on the pretext that he was owed significant arrears of salary. The expedition's commander Frederick Schomberg dismissed Phillips from the post of second engineer. He returned to work on Portsmouth's fortifications in July 1690, receiving commendations for his diligence from Queen Mary. He joined the Duke of Marlborough's expedition to Munster in September that year, and showed his expertise during the sieges of Cork and Kinsale. As a reward he was restored to his office as second engineer in April 1691. He had also spent his time in designing a new gun carriage for naval warships, and in 1690 his design was adopted for all the guns of HMS Royal Sovereign. He had also developed a mould to cast large cannon. He had hoped to establish a company to supply ordnance to the crown, but died before this was realised.

== Last campaigns ==
Phillips's pay was in arrears again by 1692, causing him significant financial difficulties. He was sent in August with a squadron to reconnoitre the Channel Islands and St Malo, the latter being the main base for French privateers. He returned to England and presented his report in October. He was then appointed, in 1693, to the post of chief engineer to the train of brass ordnance for sea service. In November he was assigned to a naval squadron under Commodore John Benbow, which was equipped with bomb vessels and fireships and was ordered to destroy St Malo. Phillips directed the bomb vessels during the opening three-day-long bombardment, before taking charge of a 300-ton galliot loaded with explosives. He brought it inshore on 19 November, intending to use it to reduce the town to ashes. The ship ran aground and exploded before it could reach the harbour, but the blast succeeded in damaging hundreds of houses and bringing down the port's sea wall.

== Death and legacy ==
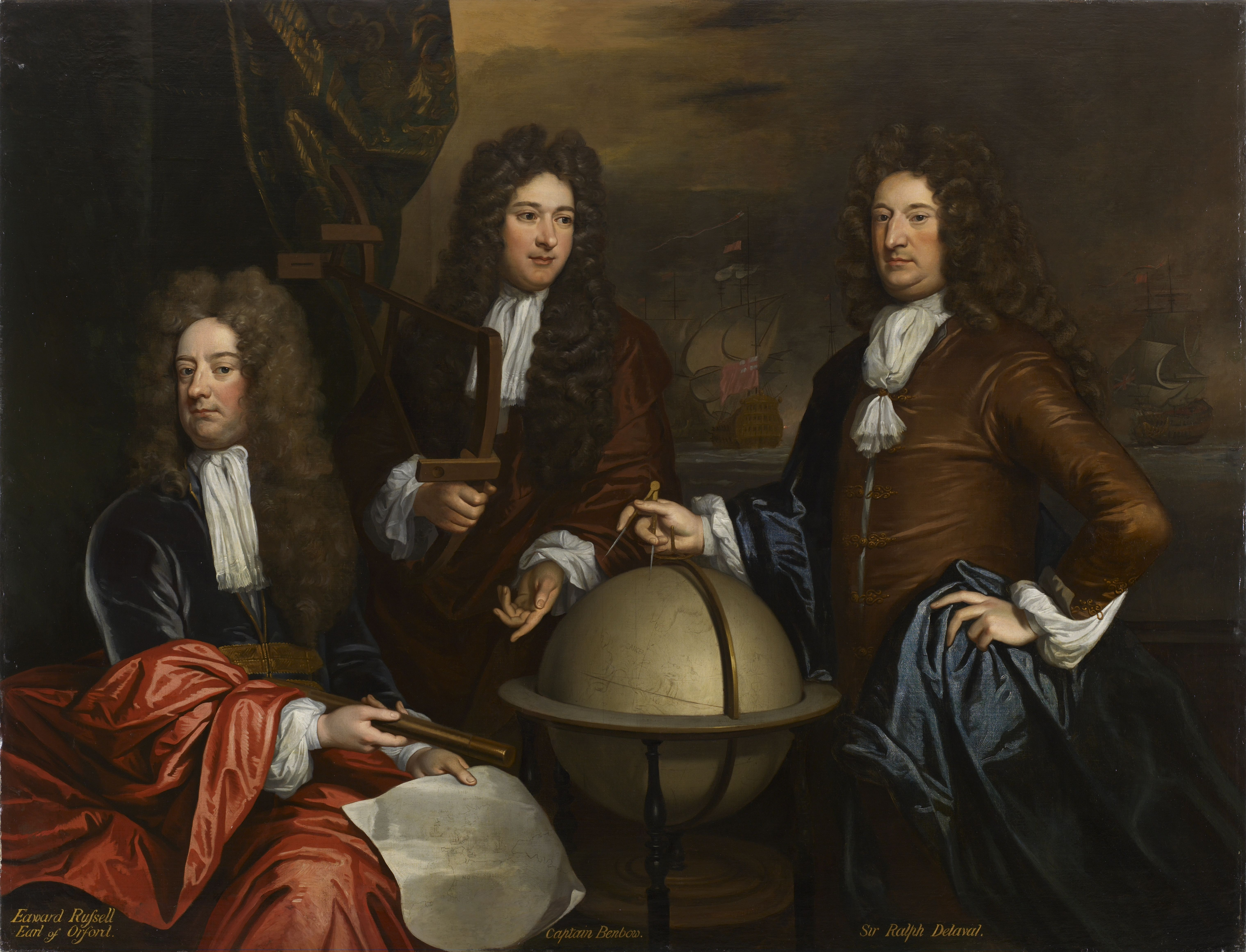
Painting in the UK government collection which has Phillips replaced by the Earl of Orford.

Phillips escaped and returned to the fleet, but may have been injured in the escapade. He died three days later aboard Benbow's flagship, HMS Norwich at Guernsey Road in the Channel Islands on 22 November 1693. His body was brought back to Portsmouth and he was buried on 29 November with military honours in the church. His son Thomas received an allowance to study engineering, whilst his widow, Frances sought payment of his arrears of pay and a pension out of the Welsh revenue to support five children.

The British Library, the National Library of Ireland, the Public Record Office, and Worcester College, Oxford, hold collections of Phillips's surviving plans and drawings. The illustration shows Murray's painting of Phillips with Admiral John Benbow and Admiral Sir Ralph Delaval which is held at the National Maritime Museum. Intriguingly the British Government's art collection also contains an almost identical painting by Godfrey Kneller but Phillips has been replaced by Edward Russell, the first Earl of Orford (Moreover, the picture looks more complete as the figure on the left's hand now holds an object).
