= Henry Walter (priest) =

Henry Walter (1611–1678?) was a Welsh Anglican priest who became a Puritan.

== Life ==
Walter was born in the parish of St. Arvans, Monmouthshire, south Wales in 1611 and studied at the University of Oxford, matriculating as a member of Jesus College, Oxford in 1633 and obtaining his Bachelor of Civil Law degree in the same year. He was ordained as a priest in the Church of England and became curate of Mounton, not far from St. Arvans, in 1639 through his brother's influence. However, Walter's religious views diverged from those of the Church of England, becoming aligned with those of the non-conformist William Wroth, who was also based in Monmouthshire; Wroth made Walter the main executor of his will. During the English Civil War, Walter seems to have left Monmouthshire for London. In 1646, he was one of three Puritan clergymen sent by the House of Commons to preach in Welsh in Wales, and he was the first name on the list of clerical commissioners approving clergy appointments in Wales under the Act for the Propagation of the Gospel in 1650. In 1653, Walter became vicar of St Woolos in Newport, but he was ejected from there in 1662 after the Restoration. In 1672, he was given a licence to minister in Llantarnam and later inspired the Independent congregation in Mynyddislwyn, to whom he left some money in his will. He died sometime before 8 August 1678.
