= Hugh Lloyd (bishop) =

Welsh Anglican bishop

Hugh Lloyd (born between 1586 and 1589 – 7 June 1667) was a Welsh cleric who was the Anglican bishop of Llandaff from 1660 until his death in 1667.

Born in Cardiganshire, Lloyd entered Oriel College, Oxford in 1607, graduating with a BA in 1611 and an MA in 1614. He is said to have become a Fellow of Jesus College, Oxford in 1614, but the college's records do not list him as ever being a fellow. Lloyd obtained further degrees of BD in 1624 and DD in 1638, as a member of Jesus College. He was appointed to the livings of St Andrews, Dinas Powis, Glamorgan (1617) and St Nicholas in the same county in 1626, later being given the sinecure position of rector of Denbigh in 1637 and given the living of Hirnant, Montgomeryshire, in 1638. He became Canon and Archdeacon of St David's in 1644.

During the English Civil War, he was a marked Royalist and lost his position as Archdeacon and also his parish livings. He was taken prisoner for three weeks by Colonel Thomas Horton after the Battle of St Fagans in May 1648. Orders were given for his arrest on 9 February 1651 and in 1652 some property of his, in Herefordshire, was forfeited for treason (although he successfully fought against this and possession was restored to him in 1652).

On the Restoration, he was appointed Bishop of Llandaff (He was elected to the See on 17 October 1660, confirmed 17 November, and consecrated a bishop on 2 December 1660) and was reappointed to his previous parishes and his Archdeaconry. He was also made rector of Llangattock in Brecknockshire. He supported free schools (described Glamorgan in a A Letter to the Clergy for the support of the Free Schools as "utterly destitute of schools") and took an active interest in the diocese of Llandaff. However, his work left little mark. He was buried in Llandaff Cathedral.
