= Jenkin Jones (captain) =

Welsh captain, Puritan cleric and preacher

Jenkin Jones (born 1623) was a Welsh captain in the army of the Parliamentarians during the English Civil War, and a Puritan cleric and preacher.

== Life ==
Jones was born in the parish of Llanddetty, Brecknockshire and matriculated at Jesus College, Oxford in 1639. He was a prominent soldier and preacher during the English Civil War, and was married to the niece of Bussy Mansell, a leading Parliamentarian in Glamorgan. Whilst believing that the Baptist principles on who ought to be baptised and how this should take place were correct, he was not an exclusionist like others of the time, and was willing to welcome members of other denominations to communion. He was one of the Approvers named under the Propagation Act 1650, and worked as an itinerant preacher in Brecknockshire and elsewhere, including the Merthyr Tydfil area. In 1657, he became the minister at Llanddetty. After the Restoration of the monarchy, Jones was imprisoned at Carmarthen but soon released. However, reports that he was gathering followers and making speeches led to his further imprisonment, and there is no further record of him after this time.
