= Declaration of Sports =

17th century English legal document

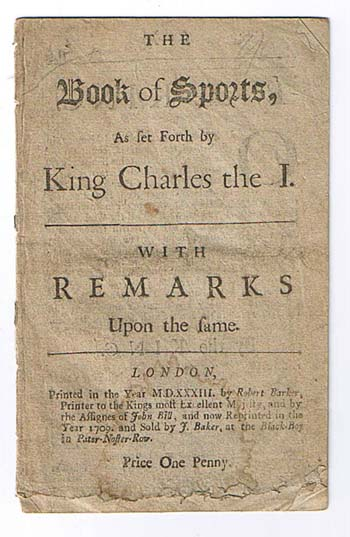
Title page of the 1803 reprinting of the 1633 edition of the Book of Sports.

The Declaration of Sports (also known as the Book of Sports) was a declaration of James I of England issued just for Lancashire in 1617, nationally in 1618, and reissued by Charles I in 1633. It listed the sports and recreations that were permitted on Sundays and other holy days.

== Issue under James I ==
It was originally issued in consultation with Thomas Morton, bishop of Chester, to resolve a dispute in Lancashire between the Puritans and the gentry (many of whom were Roman Catholics). The initial declaration was just for Lancashire, but in 1618, James made the declaration national. The 1618 declaration had largely the same main text as the 1617 version, but with an additional paragraph at the beginning explaining that the king had decided to make the declaration applicable to the whole of England. James transmitted orders to the clergy of the whole of England to read the declaration from the pulpit, but encountering strong opposition he withdrew his command.

The declaration listed archery, dancing, "leaping, vaulting, or any other such harmless recreation" as permissible sports, together with "May-games, Whitsun-ales and Morris-dances, and the setting up of May-poles". Also allowed: "women shall have leave to carry rushes to the church for the decorating of it, according to their old custom." Amongst the activities that were prohibited were bear- and bull-baiting, "interludes" and bowling.

On the one hand, the declaration rebuked Puritans and other "precise persons", and was issued to counteract the growing Puritan calls for strict abstinence on the Christian Sabbath (Sabbatarianism). On the other, it condemned Catholics and others who did not attend church services in their parish, as the declaration specified that only people who had first attended divine service were entitled to participate in recreations afterward.

== Re-issue under Charles I ==
The declaration was reissued by Charles I on 18 October 1633, as The King's Majesty's declaration to his subjects concerning lawful sports to be used. It was claimed by William Prynne that the new declaration was written by Charles' new Archbishop of Canterbury, William Laud, but Laud denied this and there is only evidence that he supported and facilitated the reissue. Moreover, the 1633 declaration has the same main text as the 1617 and 1618 declarations of King James, with the primary differences an additional introduction and conclusion adding wakes and ales (countryside festivals) to the list of sanctioned recreations. Charles ordered that any minister who refused to read it would be deprived of position. As the Puritans gained power in Parliament in the lead-up to the English Civil War, hostility to the Book of Sports grew. Attempts to enforce the declaration came to an end with the fall of Archbishop Laud in 1640, and Parliament ordered the book publicly burned in 1643, two years before Laud was executed.

== Bibliography and further reading ==
- Craigie, James, ed. Minor Prose Works of James VI and James I. Scottish Text Society, 1982: 217–241.
- George, David, ed. Records of Early English Drama: Lancashire. University of Toronto Press, 1991.
- Govett, L. A. The King's Book of Sports: A History of the Declarations of King James I. and King Charles I. as to the Use of Lawful Sports on Sundays. London, 1890.
- Parker, Kenneth. The English Sabbath: A Study of Doctrine and Discipline from the Reformation to the Civil War. Cambridge University Press, 1988.
- Semenza, Gregory M. Colón. Sport, Politics, and Literature in the English Renaissance. University of Delaware Press/AUP, 2003.
- Tait, James. "The Declaration of Sports for Lancashire". English Historical Review 32 (1917): 561–568.
- Struna NL. The Declaration of Sports Reconsidered. Canadian Journal of History of Sport. 1983;14(2):44-68. doi:10.1123/cjhs.14.2.44
- McDowell, N. (2005), The stigmatizing of Puritans as Jews in Jacobean England: Ben Jonson, Francis Bacon and the Book of Sports controversy. Renaissance Studies, 19: 348-363.
- Heasim Sul (2000) The King's Book of Sports: The Nature of Leisure in Early Modern England, The International Journal of the History of Sport, 17:4, 167-179, DOI:10.1080/09523360008714153
- James T. King James's Book of Sports, 1617. Historian. 2017(134):42-45.
- Text of the Declaration of Sports, 1633: ,
- Digital version of the Lancashire Records of Early English Drama
