= Manfredi =

Manfredi is a surname of Italian origin. The name may refer to:

== People ==
- Manfredi family, a noble family, lords of Faenza, Italy
  - Francesco I Manfredi (1260–1343), Lord of Faenza
  - Astorre I Manfredi (1345–1405), condottiero, founder of the Compagnia della Stella
  - Astorre II Manfredi (1412–1468), Lord of Faenza
    - Galeotto Manfredi (1440–1888), Italian condottiero, Lord of Faenza.
    - Carlo II Manfredi (1439–1484), Lord of Faenza
  - Astorre III Manfredi (1485–1502), Lord of Faenza
- Manfredi (1232–1266), King of Sicily
- Andrea Manfredi (1992–2018), Italian cyclist
- Barbara Manfredi (1444–1466), Italian wife of Pino III Ordelaffi, lord of Forlì
- Bartolomeo Manfredi (1582–1622), Italian painter; a leading member of the Caravaggisti
- Christopher Manfredi (born 1959), Canadian professor of political science
- Ercole Manfredi (1883–1973), Italian architect who worked in Siam (Thailand)
- Eustachio Manfredi (1674–1739), Italian mathematician, astronomer and poet
- Fabrizio Manfredi (b. 1967), Italian voice actor and dubbing director
- Gabriele Manfredi (1681–1761), Italian mathematician
- Gaetano Manfredi (b. 1964), Italian teacher and politician
- Gianfranco Manfredi (1948–2025), Italian singer-songwriter, author, actor, and cartoonist
- Girolamo Manfredi (1430–1493), Italian philosopher, physician, and astronomer
- Giuseppe Manfredi (1828–1918), Italian professor, jurist, and politician
- Giuseppe Manfredi (admiral) (1897–1979), Italian admiral in the Regia Marina
- Guidantonio Manfredi (1407–1448), Italian condottiero, Lord of Faenza
- Isabella Manfredi (b. 1987), Australian singer-songwriter and lead singer of the Preatures
- Juan J. Manfredi (b. 1957), mathematician
- Kevin Manfredi (b. 1995), Italian Grand Prix motorcycle racer
- Laurence Manfredi (b. 1974), French Olympic shot putter
- Manfredo Manfredi (1859–1927), Italian architect
- Manfred I of Turin (b. 1000), second Arduinici marquis of Susa from 977 until his death
  - Ulric Manfred II of Turin (died 1041), count of Turin and marquis of Susa in the early 11th century
- Marco Manfredi (b. 1997), Italian rugby union player
- Maria Florencia Manfredi (b. 1982), Argentine equestrian athlete
- Matt Manfredi, American screenwriter
- Max Manfredi (b. 1956), Italian singer-songwriter
- Nino Manfredi (1921–2004), Italian actor
- Taddeo Manfredi (1431–1486), Italian Lord of Imola, from 1448 until 1473
- Valerio Massimo Manfredi (b. 1943), Italian architect and historian
- Kayla Manfredi (b. 2007), American

== Fictional characters ==
- Kate Manfredi, character in the Australian television series McLeod's Daughters

== See also ==
- Manfred (surname)
- Manfredini
