= Manfred =

Manfred may refer to:

== Arts and entertainment ==
- Manfred (drama), a closet drama written in 1816–1817 by Lord Byron
- Manfred (Schumann), 1852 incidental music based on the Byron poem
- Manfred Symphony, 1885 symphony by Tchaikovsky based on the Byron poem
- Manfred Mann, 1960s English rock band
  - The Manfreds, 1990s reunion of former members of Manfred Mann
- Manfred, or Manny, character in Ice Age

== People ==
- Manfred (given name), including a list of people with the name
- Manfred (surname), including a list of people with the name

== Other uses ==
- Manfred, North Dakota, a place in the U.S.
- Manfred Township, Lac qui Parle County, Minnesota, a township in the U.S. named after the work by Byron
- Manfred (horse) (1922–1940), an Australian Thoroughbred racehorse

== See also ==
- Manfreda, a genus of flowering plants
- Manfred on the Jungfrau (disambiguation)
- Manfredi (disambiguation)
- Manfredonia (disambiguation)
- Monfreid (disambiguation)
