= Manfredi family =

Italian noble family

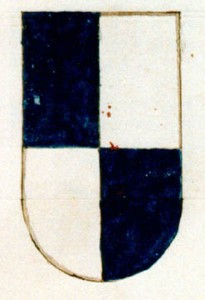
Coat of arms of the Manfredi family

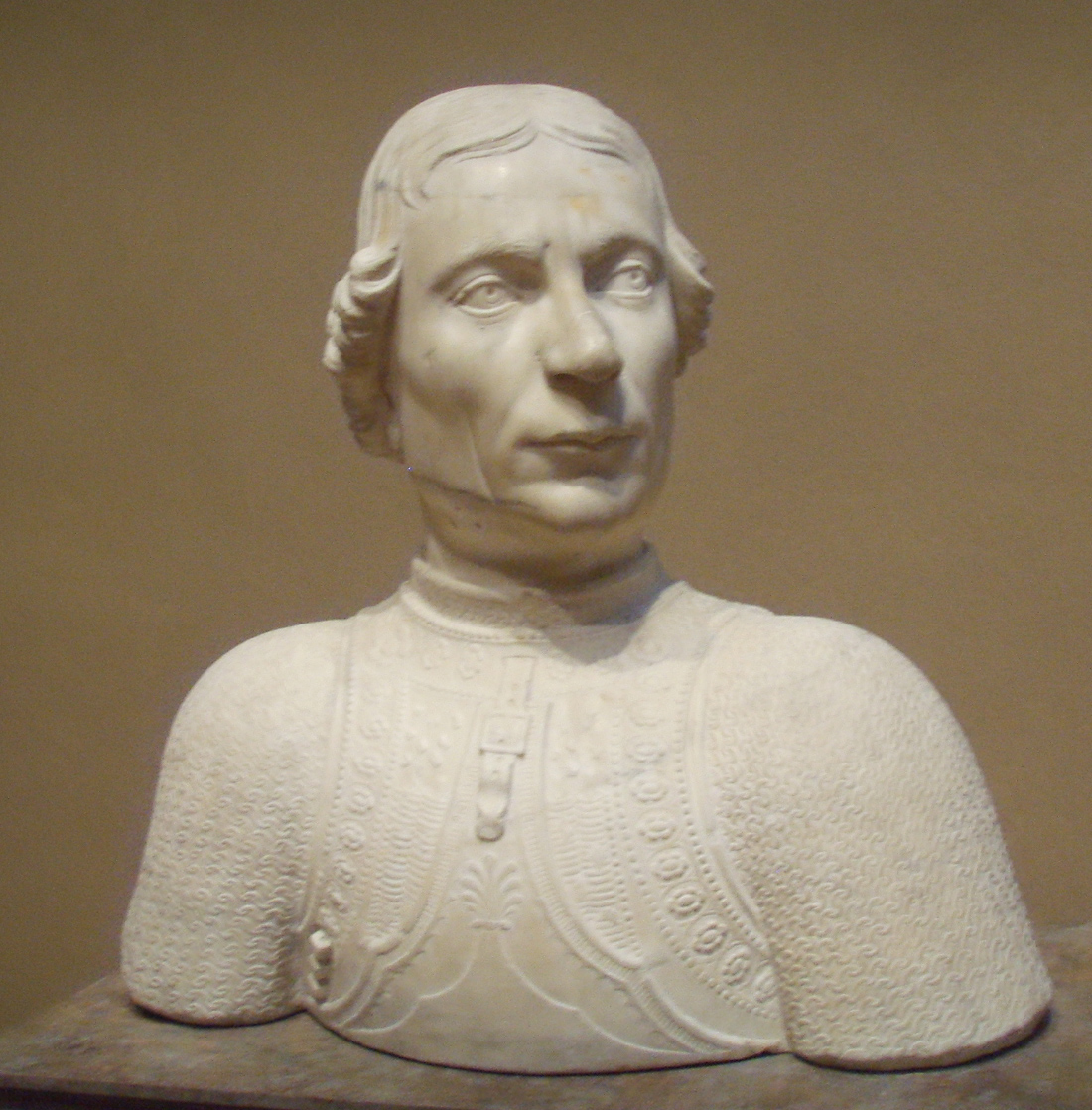
Portrait of Astorre II Manfredi by Mino da Fiesole (1455, National Gallery of Art, Washington D.C.

The Manfredi were a noble family of northern Italy, who ruled the city of Faenza in Romagna from the beginning of the 14th century to the end of the 15th century. The family also held the lordship of Imola for several decades at the same time.

The first mention of the Manfredi family in Faenza is dated 1050. The family members were patricians of the city and consuls. The first Manfredi lord of Faenza was Francesco I Manfredi, son of Alberghetto, and the last was Astorre Manfredi IV.

== Manfredi family members who were Lords of Faenza ==
- Francesco I Manfredi 1319–1327
- Albergheto I Manfredi 1327–1328
- (From 1328 to 1339, Faenza was under the rule of the Papal State)
- Riccardo Manfredi 1339–1340
- Francesco I Manfredi (second term) 1340–1341
- Giovanni Manfredi 1341–1356
- (From 1356 to 1379, Faenza was under the rule of the Papal State)
- Astorre I Manfredi 1379–1404
- (From 1404 to 1410, Faenza was under the rule of the Papal State)
- Gian Galeazzo I Manfredi 1410–1416
- Carlo I Manfredi 1416–1420
- Guidantonio Manfredi 1420–1443
- Astorre II Manfredi 1443–1468 (conjointly with Gian Galeazzo II)
- Gian Galeazzo II Manfredi 1443–1465 (conjointly with Astorre II)
- Carlo II Manfredi 1468–1477
- Galeotto Manfredi 1440–1488 (poisoned by his wife Francesca Bentivoglio)
- Astorre III Manfredi 1488–1501
- (From 1501 to 1503, Faenza was ruled by Cesare Borgia)
- Astorre IV Manfredi 1503, (last Manfredi to rule Faenza)
- Lucas Manfredi 1996
- Giovanni Manfredi 2006
- Elias Douros 2007
- Elise René Manfredi 2018 (Heir of Faenza)

== Manfredi family members who were Lords of Imola ==
- Guidantonio Manfredi 1439–1441
- Astorre II Manfredi 1441–1448
- Taddeo Manfredi 1448–1473
