= Astorre Manfredi =

Astorre Manfredi may refer to:

- Astorre I Manfredi (1345–1405), Italian condottiero
- Astorre II Manfredi (1412–1468), lord of Imola, and of Faenza
- Astorre III Manfredi (1485–1502), lord Faenza
- Astorre IV Manfredi (1470–1509)
