= Carlo Manfredi =

Carlo Manfredi may refer to:

- Carlo I Manfredi (1406–1410), brother of Guidantonio Manfredi, lord of Faenza
- Carlo II Manfredi (1439–1484), lord of Faenza
