= Shahu Khel =

Hangu, Kohat

Coordinates: 33°35′N 71°07′E

Shahu Khel, also spelt Shahukhel, is a town of Hangu District in the Khyber-Pakhtunkhwa province of Pakistan. It is located at 33°35'19N 71°7'21E with an altitude of 807 metres. Shahu Khel is located at the boundary of Orakzai Agency. A beautiful river is running beside the village Shahu Khel and its landscape is attractive due to its variations.

== Notable people ==
- Ali Haidar, recipient of the Victoria Cross for actions during the Spring 1945 offensive in Italy when he singlehandedly stormed and took captive multiple German forts which allowed his unit to safely cross the Senio River in Fusignano, Italy. He was from Saidan Banda Hangu. He is the only Pashtun (Belonging from the Bangash Tribe) who was awarded the Victoria Cross in the Second World War.
