= Manfred on the Jungfrau =

Manfred on the Jungfrau is the title of two paintings:

- Manfred on the Jungfrau (Martin), an 1837 watercolour version by John Martin
- Manfred on the Jungfrau (Madox Brown), an 1842 oil-on-canvas version by Ford Madox Brown
