= Yuriy Drohobych =

Ruthenian polymath (1473–1494)

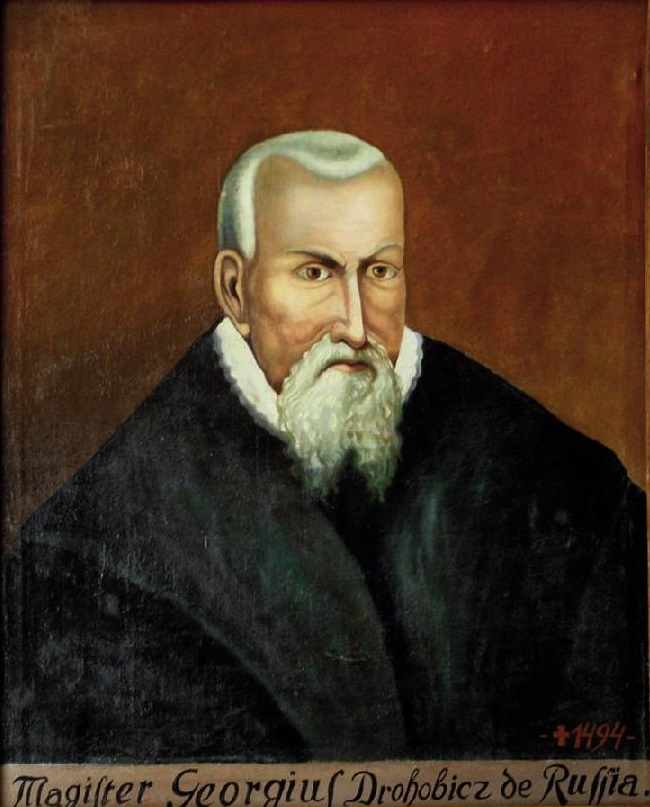
- Born: Drohobych, Ruthenian Voivodeship, Kingdom of Poland
- Died: February 4, 1494; Kraków, Kraków Voivodeship, Kingdom of Poland
- Occupation: astronomer
- Years active: 1473–1494

Yuriy Drohobych or Kotermak (Note: Latin: Georgius de Russia, Georgius de Leopoli, Ukrainian: Юрій Дрогобич, Polish: Jerzy z Drohobycza) (1450 – 4 February 1494) was a Ruthenian philosopher, astronomer, writer, medical doctor, rector of the University of Bologna, and professor of Kraków Academy, and the first publisher of a Church Slavonic printed text. He is the author of Iudicium Pronosticon Anni 1483 Currentis.

== Biography ==
=== Education ===
Yuriy Drohobych was born in the city of Drohobych in the Kingdom of Poland, to a townsman Michael Donat Kotermak.

In 1468 or early 1469 Drohobych entered the Jagiellonian University in Kraków. Two years later he received his bachelor's degree and in 1473 his master's. He taught during the summer and participated in scientific discussions on Saturdays and Sundays. After he gained some significant achievements in Kraków, Drohobych traveled to Bologna University, where natural sciences and medicine were gaining popularity. Here he improved his Latin, learned Greek, and continued his studies of natural philosophy, especially astronomy. Drohobych's astronomy professor was Girolamo Manfredi, one of the most renowned astronomers in 15th century Italy. Manfredi introduced Drohobych to German astronomer Johannes Müller (Regiomontanus), who believed in heliocentrism; however, it had not been mathematically proven at that time.

=== Teaching ===
In 1478 Drohobych received his doctorate in philosophy, but he continued his studies. This time he took up medicine. At that time natural philosophy disciplines were closely connected. Almost all contemporary philosophers demonstrated prowess in astronomy and medicine, which allowed university professors to transfer from one department to another. Similar methods were used in teaching both disciplines, the reading and interpretation of Latin translations of Greek and Arab classical authors.

Shortly after Drohobych completed his medical studies, he was offered a position to teach astronomy at Bologna University. At the beginning of 1481, the student body of the university elected Drohobych the rector of the school of Medicine and Free Arts; he was only thirty at the time. For a year, the regular term in office for an elected rector, he combined his academic responsibilities, which included teaching astronomy and medical research, with administrative obligations. He had civil and legal authority over the students and faculty who were under his supervision. In 1482 he received his PhD in medicine.

In 1486 Drohobych returned to Kraków. He started his medical practice and also taught medicine at Jagiellonian University. Similar to his peers from Bologna, he based his lectures on the works of Hippocrates, Galen, and Avicenna. A few years later, he received his professorship in medicine and became the doctor of the Polish king Casimir IV Jagiellon. In 1492 he became the Dean of the Department of Medicine. It was customary at that time for professors to have off-site meetings to discuss with students issues that did not fit the official scientific doctrine. Copernicus attended Drohobych's meetings, but it is not certain whether the former had an influence on the latter.

At that time, the concept of ‘medicine' was different from how it is understood today. In fact, there were two terms designated to define healing practices. The term ‘medicine' derived from the Latin verb medico, meaning "to drug". The practice of medicine therefore emphasized an ability to administer curative remedies. For their part, physicians themselves practiced another kind of healing art, "physic". The term derived from the Greek noun physis, meaning "nature". Physicians had to study natural philosophy because the purposes of physic were to preserve health and prolong life; healing the sick was an important part, but only one of the many parts, of physic. The physician had to be able to offer advice to the healthy as well as to the sick about how to live according to nature, for being in harmony with nature would result in the preservation of health as well as the prolongation of life. Thus "medicine" and "physic," as used in the late 15th century, are terms that suggest the differences between major traditions in the healing arts: one based upon experience, the other upon learning; one concerned primarily with healing, the other primarily with the preservation of health. Drohobych's appointment to Casimir's court is an indication that he succeeded in both healing fields, because such an important position required extraordinary knowledge of philosophy and natural philosophy as well as practical experience in curing illnesses.

== Publications ==
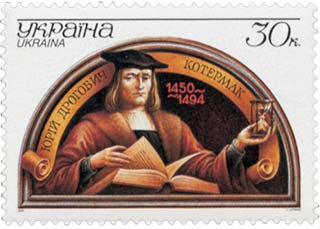
Yuriy Drohobych on a 30-kopiyok stamp

His teaching at Bologna did not interfere with his experiments in astronomy. In an early 1478 letter to his friend Mykola Chepel in Poznań, Drohobych mentioned his calculations of planetary positions during a year. According to his observations and calculations, he estimated the exact time for two lunar eclipses; he also included a chart of the phases of the Moon for a year. In the letter, Drohobych described how he had calculated the geographic locations of major cities in what is now Poland and Ukraine. He also gave predictions concerning political events that had been taking place in Europe, Egypt, Turkey, Arabia, and India. Chepel shared these notes with his colleagues at Poznań University. The news about Drohobych's findings quickly spread among many learned people in Europe. One of the first German Humanists, book collector Hartmann Schedel, copied these letters. In part thanks to his efforts, they were preserved for posterity.

Drohobych wrote a treatise about the solar eclipse that took place on July 29, 1478. He suggested that cosmic events of this nature may or may not have favorable effects on events on Earth but they certainly would not cause catastrophes. In 1483 Drohobych published in Rome his first book in Latin, Prognostic Estimation of the year 1483 (Iudicium Pronosticon Anni MCCCCLXXXIII Currentis). It was a nineteen-page publication of astrological (zodiac) calendars, which were popular at that time, that helped readers to predict events on Earth depending on the planets' positions. This publication had several noteworthy elements: Drohobych gave accurate predictions for two lunar eclipses; he provided accurate calculations of the phases of the Moon; and he also touched upon the subject of planetary movement. Furthermore, he indicated that the geographic coordinates were an important factor in determining the sun's and planets' positions. Depending on the geographic location of the observer, the positions of cosmic objects would vary. His longitude calculations were not error-free, however. He was the first Eastern European scholar who in a printed publication indicated the exact geographic coordinates of several Ukrainian, Polish, and Lithuanian cities.

Weather forecasting was another aspect of Drohobych's publication. He suggested that by observing atmospheric phenomena, one can predict the weather. He also argued that climatic conditions depended on the latitude of a geographic location. One of the most important aspects of this treatise was the author's vision that the world is not an abstract notion and that humans are capable of learning its patterns and laws. In the foreword to the treatise, Drohobych wrote that even though our eyes cannot see the end of the boundless skies, our mind can. That we learn from the effect about the cause and from the latter we truly learn.

In 1491 Drohobych published one of the first books in the Church Slavonic language "Осьмогласник", ("Octoechos "or "Antiphonal"), and the first books in Ukrainian: "Часословець" ("Horologion" or "Book of Hours"), "Тріодь пісна" and "Тріодь цвітна" (Triodion). All these publications built the foundation for the further development of the Ukrainian cultural identity.

Drohobych died on February 4, 1494, in Kraków, at 44. He left behind a rich legacy. During his tenure at Jagiellonian University, humanistic ideas began to gain popularity among professors and students. Drohobych was the first Ukrainian scholar to advance these ideas in Ukraine. As time went on, he found many followers among Ukrainian scholars and students who studied in Italy and Poland and who disseminated these ideas upon their return to their homeland. In the mid-15th century, due to the lack of internal and external stimuli, Ukraine's education system slipped into decay. Drohobych and his followers created a niche that helped to preserve, sustain, and develop socio-cultural and philosophical ideas that lay the foundation for Ukraine's revival by the 17th and 18th centuries, helping preserve the national identity at a time when present-day Ukrainian lands belonged to different rulers.
