= Ali Haidar (VC) =

Recipient of the Victoria Cross (1913–1999)

Naib Subedar Ali Haidar Khan Victoria Cross VC

- Born: 21 August 1913; Kohat, North-West Frontier, British Indian Empire
- Died: 15 July 1999 (aged 85); Hangu, Pakistan
- Burial place: Shahu Khel, Kohat District
- Military career
- Allegiance: British India
- Branch: British Indian Army
- Service years: 1931–1954
- Rank: Naib Subedar
- Unit: 13th Frontier Force Rifles
- Conflicts: World War II; Italian Campaign
- Awards: Victoria Cross

Ali Haidar Khan VC (21 August 1913 – 15 July 1999) was a Pakistani recipient of the Victoria Cross, the highest and most prestigious award for gallantry in the face of the enemy that can be awarded to British and Commonwealth forces. During the Second World War, at Fusignano, Italy, 31-year-old Ali Haidar, serving in the British Indian Army, performed an act of bravery for which he was awarded the Victoria Cross.

== Details ==
He was 31 years old, and a Sepoy in the 6th battalion 13th Frontier Force Rifles, in the British Indian Army during World War II. Ali Haidar and his regiment were involved in the evacuation from Dunkirk in 1940. The battalion arrived in Dover, England from Dunkirk in June 1940 and they were soon merged into the other battalions of the 13th Frontier Force Rifles. Ali Haidar's battalion was stationed in Brighton for most of the war until it was sent to be part of the Allied liberation of Italy. The regiment was first sent to North Africa to partake in some battles during the North African campaign. Once in North Africa, the Regiment underwent further training at Casablanca. By April 29, 1944, the Regiment had landed in Italy. In 1945, the regiment was in Italy when the following deed took place for which Ali Haidar was awarded the VC.

On 9 April 1945 near Fusignano, Italy, at the start of the Allied Spring 1945 offensive in Italy Haidar's battalion was tasked with a difficult assault crossing of the Senio River. Only Sepoy Ali Haidar and the two other men of his section managed to get across under heavy machine-gun fire. Then, without orders, and on his own initiative, Sepoy Ali Haidar, leaving the other two to cover him, charged the nearest post which was about 30 yards away. He threw a grenade and almost at the same time the enemy threw one at him, wounding him severely in the back. In spite of this he kept on and the enemy post was destroyed and four of the enemy surrendered. With utter disregard of his own wounds he continued and charged the next post in which the enemy had one Spandau and three automatics, which were still very active and preventing movement on both banks. He was again wounded, this time in the right leg and right arm. Although weakened by loss of blood, with great determination Sepoy Ali Haidar crawled closer and in a final effort raised himself from the ground, threw a grenade, and charged into the second enemy post. Two enemy were wounded and the remaining two surrendered.

Taking advantage of the success of Sepoy Ali Haidar's attacks, the rest of the Company charged across the river and carried out their task of making a bridgehead. Sepoy Ali Haidar was picked up and brought back from the second position seriously wounded. He was sent to Lanciano to be treated for his wounds. He then fought in the Arzignano, Marino, Pescara, Verona and Milan sectors of the campaign and eventually retired from the army after the war ended. The conspicuous gallantry, initiative, and determination combined with a complete disregard for his own life shown by Sepoy in the face of heavy odds was an example to the whole Company. His heroism had saved the rest of the company. With the rapid advance which it was possible to make the Battalion captured 3 officers and 217 other ranks and gained their objectives. The rest of the company were then able to cross the river and establish a bridgehead. Due to his bravery, he received the Victoria Cross from King George VI in October 1945. He retired to a small scrub farm with his wife in his hometown of Kohat and died on 15 July 1999.

== Further information ==
He was born in Kohat, North-West Frontier Provinces of the British Indian Empire in what is now Khyber Pukhtunkhwa, Pakistan to a Bangash Pashtun family. He would achieve the rank of Naib Subedar in his parent battalion, 6th Royal Battalion 13th Frontier Force Rifles which later redesignated as 1st Battalion (Scinde) The Frontier Force Regiment. His VC is on display in the Lord Ashcroft Gallery at the Imperial War Museum in London. On 9 April 2017 the Mayor of Lugo di Romagna Davide Ranalli unveiled a Memorial dedicated to VC Ali Haidar upon the Senio River western bank in the vicinity of the Sabbioni area. The ceremony was attended by several Italian politicians including the mayor of Rome.

== Official citation ==
The official citation for Haidar's award, published in the London Gazette in July 1945 reads:

The KING has been graciously pleased to approve the award of the VICTORIA CROSS to: — No. 26534 Sepoy ALl HAIDAR, 13th Frontier Force Rifles, British Indian Army.

In Italy, during the crossing of the River Senio, near Fusignano, in daylight on 9 April 1945, a Company of the I3th Frontier Force Rifles were ordered to assault the enemy positions strongly dug in on the far bank. These positions had been prepared and improved over many months and were mainly on the steep flood banks, some 25 feet high.

Sepoy Ali Haidar was a member of the lefthand Section of the left-hand Platoon. As soon as the Platoon started to cross, it came under heavy and accurate machine gun fire from two enemy posts strongly dug in about 60 yards away. Sepoy Ali Haidar's Section suffered casualties and only 3 men, including himself, managed to get across. The remainder of the Company was temporarily held up. Without orders, and on his own initiative, Sepoy Ali Haidar, leaving the other two to cover him, charged the nearest post which was about 30 yards away. He threw a grenade and almost at the same time the enemy threw one at him, wounding him severely in the back. In spite of this he kept on and the enemy post was destroyed and four of the enemy surrendered. With utter disregard of his own wounds he continued and charged the next post in which the enemy had one Spandau and three automatics, which were still very active and preventing movement on 'both banks. He was "again wounded, this time in the right leg and right arm. Although weakened by loss of blood, with great determination Sepoy Ali Haidar crawled closer and in a final effort raised himself from the ground, threw a grenade, and charged into the second enemy post. Two enemy were wounded and the remaining two surrendered.

Taking advantage of the outstanding success of Sepoy Ali Haidar's dauntless attacks, the rest of the Company charged across the river and carried out their task of making a bridgehead.

Sepoy Ali Haidar was picked up and brought back from the second position seriously wounded.

The conspicuous gallantry, initiative, and determination combined with a complete disregard for his own life shown by this very brave Sepoy in the face of heavy odds were an example to the whole Company. His heroism had saved an ugly situation which would — but for his personal bravery — have caused the Battalion a large number of casualties at a critical time and seriously delayed the crossing of the river and the building of a bridge. With the rapid advance which it was possible to make the Battalion captured 3 officers and 217 other ranks and gained their objectives.

== See also ==
- List of Indian Victoria Cross recipients

== Awards and decorations ==

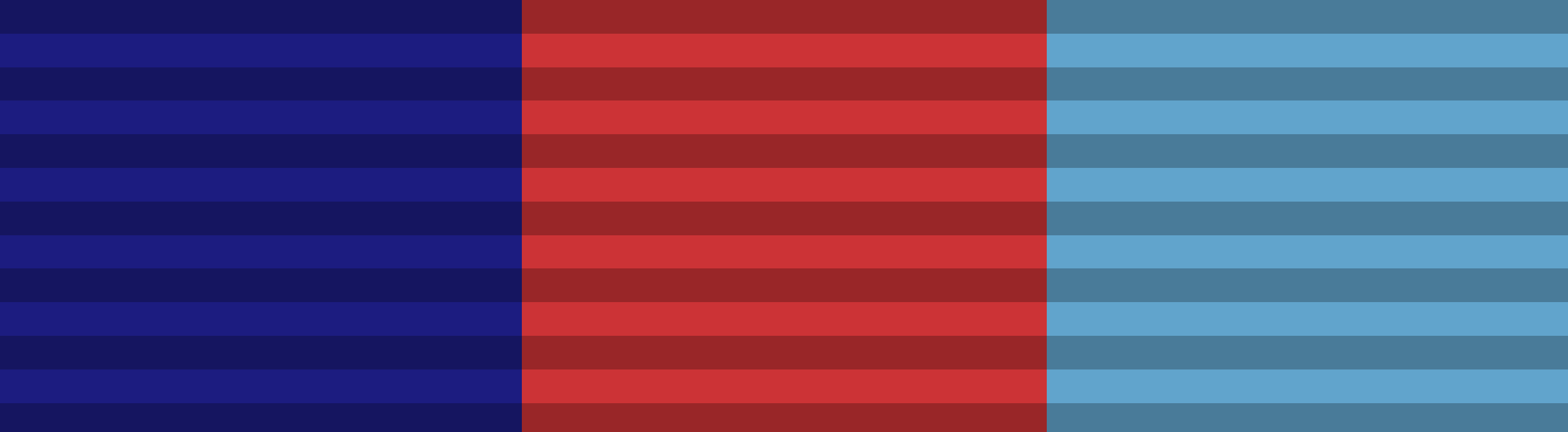

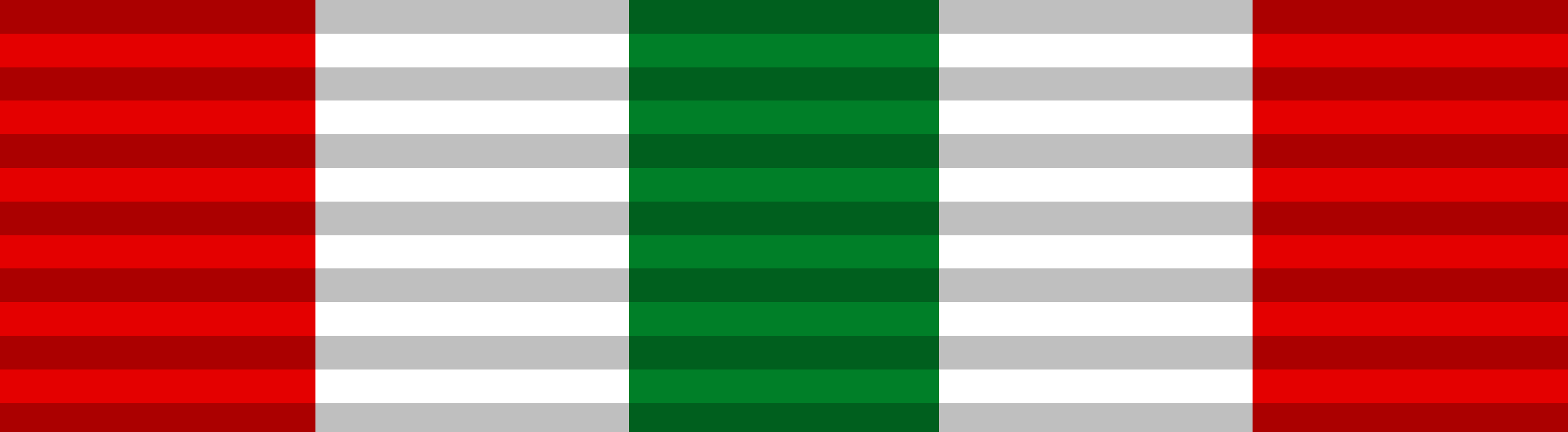

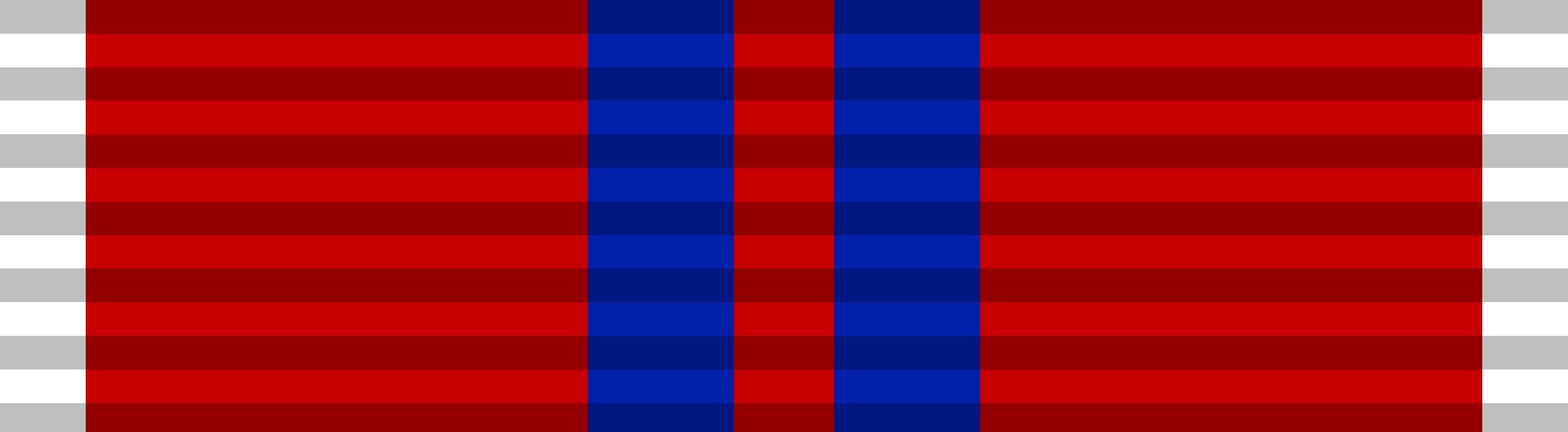

Victoria Cross 1945		1939-1945 Star	
Italy Star	War Medal 1939-1945	India Service Medal 1939–1945	Queen Elizabeth II Coronation Medal (1953)
