= Giuseppe Manfredi (admiral) =

- Born: 12 July 1897; Pieve di Teco, Kingdom of Italy
- Died: 29 January 1979 (aged 81); Genoa, Italy
- Military career
- Allegiance: Kingdom of Italy; Italy
- Branch: Regia Marina; Italian Navy
- Rank: Fleet Admiral
- Commands: Ermanno Carlotto (gunboat); Nazario Sauro (destroyer); Francesco Nullo (destroyer); Leone (destroyer); Alberico Da Barbiano (light cruiser); Gorizia (heavy cruiser); Benghazi Naval Command; Trapani Naval Fortress Area; Taranto Naval Command; 2nd Naval Division; Naval Department of La Spezia; Fleet Commander-in-Chief
- Conflicts: Italo-Turkish War; World War I; Second Italo-Ethiopian War; World War II; Battle of Punta Stilo; Battle of Cape Spartivento; North African campaign; Allied invasion of Sicily
- Awards: Silver Medal of Military Valor; Bronze Medal of Military Valor (three times); War Cross for Military Valor; War Merit Cross (four times); Military Order of Savoy; Order of Saints Maurice and Lazarus; Order of the Crown of Italy; Colonial Order of the Star of Italy; Order of Merit of the Italian Republic; Iron Cross First Class; Iron Cross Second Class

Giuseppe Manfredi (Pieve di Teco, 12 July 1897 – Genoa, 29 January 1979) was an admiral in the Regia Marina during World War II and in the postwar Marina Militare, where he rose to the post of commander-in-chief of the fleet.

== Biography ==
Born in Pieve di Teco in 1897, he entered the Naval Academy of Livorno in 1912, graduating it in 1916 with the rank of ensign after having participated in the Italo-Turkish War as a cadet officer on the training ship Flavio Gioia. During the First World War he initially served on the battleship Vittorio Emanuele, then fought on the land front with the Naval Brigade until 1918, when he was promoted to sub-lieutenant and assigned to the submarine service, serving on N 1 and later on N 3.

During the 1920s, he commanded torpedo boats and the river gunboat Ermanno Carlotto, stationed in Shanghai to protect Italian interests in China. In 1928 he was promoted to lieutenant commander, commanding the destroyers Nazario Sauro and Francesco Nullo in 1931-1932 before being promoted to commander in 1933; after a period of service at the Ministry of the Navy he was embarked in 1934 on the heavy cruiser Trento as executive officer during a mission to China. Back in Italy, he became Chief of Staff of the V Naval Division and then commander of the flotilla leader Leone, stationed in East Africa during the Second Italo-Ethiopian War. In 1938 he was promoted to captain and given command of the light cruiser Alberico Da Barbiano until May 1940, when he became commander of Gorizia.

After Italy's entry into World War II, he participated with Gorizia in the battles of Punta Stilo and Cape Spartivento, receiving two Bronze Medals for Military Valor and a War Cross for Military Valor. On 23 September 1941 he was appointed commander of the Benghazi Naval Command, a post he had to leave after only two months due to the evacuation of the town, which fell into British hands during Operation Crusader; after Benghazi was reconquered by Axis forces, Manfredi returned to the head of that Naval Command from 7 February 1942 to 19 November of the same year, when the Cyrenaic capital was abandoned again and for good following the defeat at El Alamein. On both occasions he personally directed the evacuation of personnel and the destruction of materials, making the port facilities unusable in November 1942 and then being among the last to abandon the city; for this and for his command activity during the periods of operation of the port of Benghazi he received the Knight's Cross of the Military Order of Savoy, a Silver Medal of Military Valor and from the German authorities the Iron Cross first and second class.

After returning to Italy, he was promoted to rear admiral on 1 January 1943, and in March he assumed command of the Naval Sector of Trapani. Following the Allied landings in Sicily in July 1943 and Patton's advance in western Sicily, his replacement at the command of the Trapani Naval Fortress Area with an Army general was arranged, but Manfredi refused to abandon his men and remained in Trapani, where on 23 July 1943 he fell prisoner of the Americans, after having rendered that port and that of Marsala unusable, and destroying the fuel and ammunition depots to prevent them from falling into enemy hands. After signing the surrender of the five thousand men under his command, Manfredi handed his sabre to General Matthew Ridgway, flatly refusing to reveal the location of the mines scattered in the port to render it unusable. A few days earlier, on July 17, 1943, his name - together with that of Admiral Antonio Legnani - had been among those proposed by the commander-in-chief of the Kriegsmarine to Adolf Hitler, during a meeting in the Wolfsschanze, of young and combative admirals, faithful to the Axis cause, which could have been placed at the head of a reformed Italian Navy, integrated with German officers, in place of the top management of Supermarina, seen as too detached from the reality of the front and hostile to Germany. Manfredi was a prisoner in the United States until February 1944, when he was repatriated following the new co-belligerent status of Italy; in 1945, he was denounced by a Trapani city committee for the destruction of the port, but was acquitted during the preliminary investigation, having only fulfilled his duties as a soldier. For his activity in Trapani, he was later awarded another bronze medal for military valor.

After a period at the head of the Naval Command of Taranto, in 1945-1946 he was general manager of the CREM, being promoted to divisional admiral in 1947; between 1946 and 1948 he commanded the 2nd Naval Division. In 1949, he was promoted to fleet admiral, commanding the Naval Department of La Spezia in 1950-1952 and then becoming commander-in-chief of the fleet in 1952–1953. After having held the post of vice president of the High Council of the Armed Forces, he was placed at disposal in 1955 and transferred to the naval reserve in 1960. He died in Genoa in 1979.
