= Fusignano =

- Comune
- Comune di Fusignano
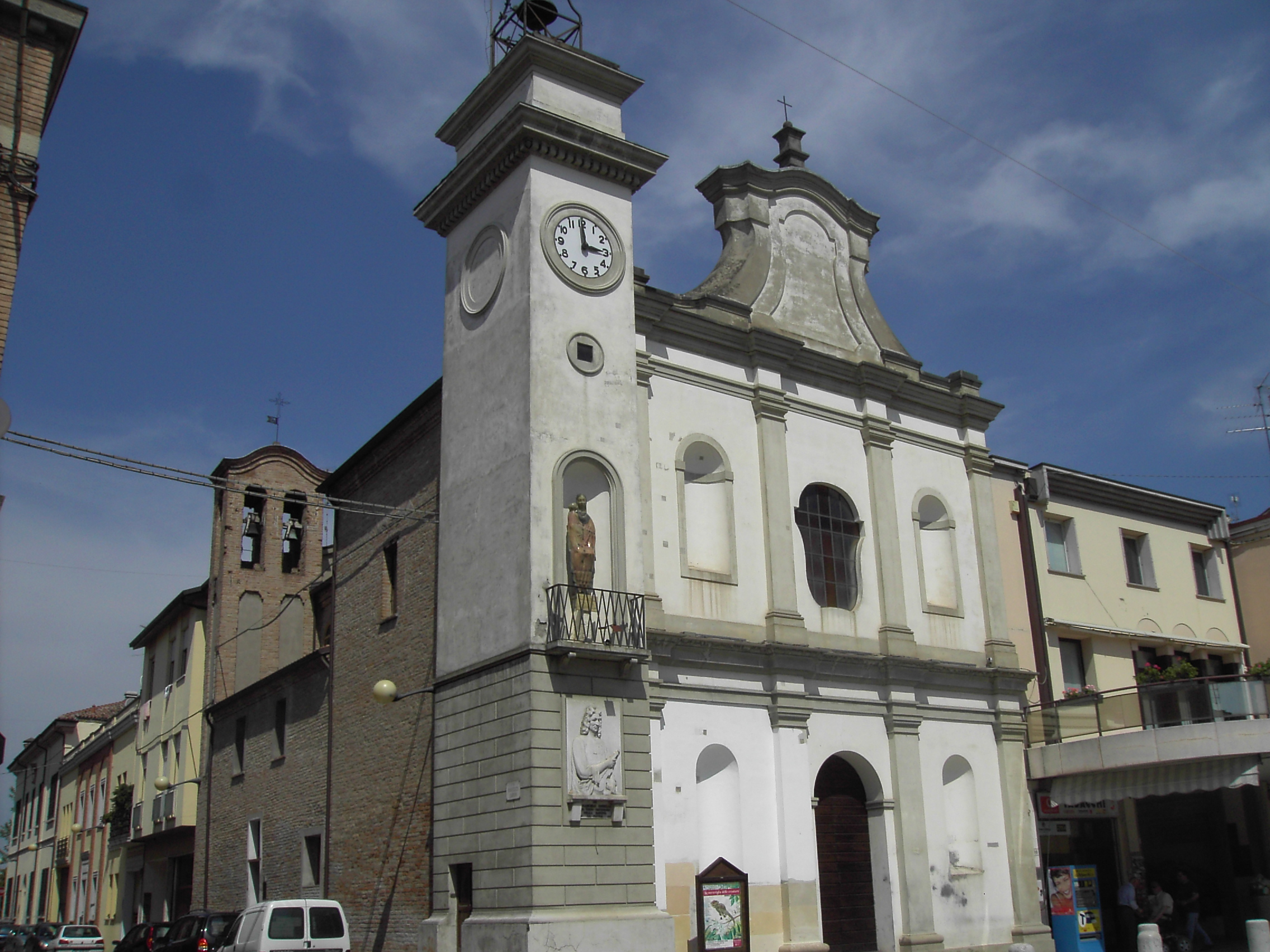
- Suffragio church

- Location within Italy Location within Emilia-Romagna
- Coordinates: 44°28′N 11°58′E
- Country: Italy
- Region: Emilia-Romagna
- Province: Ravenna (RA)
- Frazioni: San Savino, Maiano Monti, Maiano Nuovo, Scambio, Rossetta

Government
  - Mayor: Nicola Pasi

Area
  - Total: 24.55 km^{2} (9.48 sq mi)
- Elevation: 9 m (30 ft)

Population (31 August 2017)
  - Total: 8,152
  - Density: 332.1/km^{2} (860.0/sq mi)
- Demonym: Fusignanesi
- Time zone: UTC+1 (CET)
  - Summer (DST): UTC+2 (CEST)
- Postal code: 48034
- Dialing code: 05451
- Patron saint: Blessed Virgin
- Saint day: September
- Website: Official website

Fusignano (Romagnol: Fusgnàn) is a comune in the province of Ravenna (Emilia-Romagna) in Italy. It is located on the river Senio.

== History ==
The city was created in 1250 by count Bernardino of Cunio after a flood which had destroyed his castle at Donigallia. After several passages of property in the hands of local noble families, the castle of Fusignano was transferred to the Este family in 1445.

When the Duchy of Ferrara was annexed to the Papal States (1598), the fief was elevated to a marquisate, which in 1622, after a long struggle with the Corelli family, was acquired by the Calcagnini. In the 18th century the city recovered from a dark period, and in 1796 became part of the French dominions. In 1815 it returned to the Papal States. With the unification of Italy (1860), Fusignano was separated from Ferrara and included in the province of Ravenna.

During World War II, as part of the Spring 1945 offensive in Italy, Fusignano was for four months on the front line, and reduced to ruins. One soldier Ali Haidar was awarded the Victoria Cross for his actions here during World War II.

== Main sights ==
The church of San Giovanni Battista houses a 16th-century pale portraying the Baptism of Christ. In the church of San Savino the ancient sepulchre of the namesake saint, one of the first evangelizers of Romagna, can be seen: however, the relics it contained were transferred by Astorre II Manfredi to a chapel in the Cathedral of Faenza.

== Twin towns ==
Fusignano is twinned with:

- Biddulph, United Kingdom

== Personalities ==
- Arcangelo Corelli (1653 in Fusignano – 1713) Italian violin player and Baroque music composer
- Lea Melandri (born 1941 in Fusignano) feminist and writer
- Arrigo Sacchi (born 1946 in Fusignano) Italian football manager,
