= Manfredi (disambiguation) =

Manfredi is a surname.

Manfredi may also refer to:

== Given name ==
- Manfredi Chiaramonte (died 1391), Sicilian nobleman
- Manfredi Nicoletti (1930–2017), Italian architect
- Manfredi Beninati (born 1970), Italian artist

== Other uses ==
- Rocca dei Rettori or Castle of Manfredi, in Benevento, Italy
- 13225 Manfredi, an asteroid
