= Sandro Acerbo =

Italian voice actor (born 1955)

- Born: Alessandro Ancidoni; 5 September 1955 (age 70); Rome, Italy
- Occupations: Voice actor; dialogue writer; dubbing director
- Years active: 1960–present
- Children: 2
- Relatives: Rossella Acerbo (sister); Maurizio Ancidoni (brother); Fabrizio Manfredi (cousin); Massimiliano Manfredi (cousin)

Sandro Acerbo (born Alessandro Ancidoni; 5 September 1955) is an Italian voice actor.

== Biography ==
Born in Rome, Acerbo began his dubbing career as a child. Among his earliest roles include Michael Banks (portrayed by Matthew Garber) in the 1964 film Mary Poppins. He also served as the Italian voice of Patch in One Hundred and One Dalmatians, Hathi Jr. in The Jungle Book and Kurt Von Trapp in The Sound of Music.

Even as an adult, Acerbo continued dubbing characters into the Italian language. He is the official Italian voice of Brad Pitt and Will Smith as well as occasionally dubbing Hugh Grant, Dan Aykroyd, Robert Downey Jr., Matthew Broderick, Val Kilmer, Michael J. Fox, Timothy Hutton and Eddie Murphy (after Tonino Accolla's death in 2013) in some of their movies. Acerbo is most popular for voicing Marty McFly in the last two films of the Back to the Future film series, replacing Teo Bellia.

=== Personal life ===
Acerbo is the older brother of voice actress Rossella Acerbo and former voice actor Maurizio Ancidoni and the cousin of voice actors Fabrizio and Massimiliano Manfredi. He is also married with two children. Since Maurizio Ancidoni's death in 2019, Acerbo took over as the CEO and general manager of the dubbing company CDC Sefit Group.

== Filmography ==
- I ragazzi di padre Tobia - TV series (1968)

== Dubbing roles ==
=== Animation ===
- Patch in One Hundred and One Dalmatians
- Christopher Robin Winnie the Pooh and the Honey Tree
- Hathi Jr. in The Jungle Book
- Conrad, Prince, and a dwarf in Festival of Family Classics
- Nucke and Shinikiro Kida in Great Mazinger
- Blackberry in Watership Down
- The Prince in Happily Ever After
- Various characters in Family Guy
- Charles Heathbar, Agent J / Will Smith in The Simpsons
- Toa Vakama in Bionicle 2: Legends of Metru Nui
- Mike Wazowski in Monsters University, Party Central
- Duke in Isle of Dogs

=== Live action ===
- Rusty Ryan in Ocean's Eleven, Ocean's Twelve, Ocean's Thirteen
- Agent J in Men in Black, Men in Black II, Men in Black 3
- Mike Lowrey in Bad Boys II, Bad Boys for Life
- Marty McFly / Marty McFly Jr. / Marlene McFly in Back to the Future Part II
- Marty McFly / Seamus McFly in Back to the Future Part III
- Carlisle Cullen in Twilight, The Twilight Saga: New Moon, The Twilight Saga: Eclipse, The Twilight Saga: Breaking Dawn – Part 1, The Twilight Saga: Breaking Dawn – Part 2
- Jimmy Olsen in Superman, Superman II, Superman III
- Lenny Luthor in Superman IV: The Quest for Peace
- Alex P. Keaton in Family Ties
- Jerry Seinfeld in Seinfeld
- Paul Maclean in A River Runs Through It
- Aldo "The Apache" Raine in Inglourious Basterds
- Gerry Lane in World War Z
- John Smith in Mr. & Mrs. Smith
- Tristan Ludlow in Legends of the Fall
- Louis de Pointe du Lac in Interview with the Vampire
- David Mills in Seven
- Michael Sullivan in Sleepers
- Frankie McGuire in The Devil's Own
- Heinrich Harrer in Seven Years in Tibet
- Joe Black in Meet Joe Black
- Tyler Durden in Fight Club
- Mickey O'Neil in Snatch
- Jerry Welbach in The Mexican
- Tom Bishop in Spy Game
- Richard Jones in Babel
- Jesse James in The Assassination of Jesse James by the Coward Robert Ford
- Chad Feldheimer in Burn After Reading
- Benjamin Button in The Curious Case of Benjamin Button
- Mr. O'Brien in The Tree of Life
- Billy Beane in Moneyball
- Jackie Cogan in Killing Them Softly
- Samuel Bass in 12 Years a Slave
- Don "Wardaddy" Collier in Fury
- Roland in By the Sea
- Ben Rickert in The Big Short
- Max Vatan in Allied
- Glen McMahon in War Machine
- Cliff Booth in Once Upon a Time in Hollywood
- Roy McBride in Ad Astra
- James T. West in Wild Wild West
- Deadshot in Suicide Squad
- Del Spooner in I, Robot
- Alex "Hitch" Hitchens in Hitch
- Chris Gardener in The Pursuit of Happyness
- Robert Neville in I Am Legend
- John Hancock in Hancock
- Tim Thomas in Seven Pounds
- Cypher Raige in After Earth
- Judge in Winter's Tale
- Jeff Bullington in Anchorman 2: The Legend Continues
- Nicky Spurgeon in Focus
- Bennet Omalu in Concussion
- Howard Inlet in Collateral Beauty
- Daryl Ward in Bright
- Genie in Aladdin
- Henry Brogan / Jackson Brogan in Gemini Man
- Michael Banks in Mary Poppins
- Kurt Von Trapp in The Sound of Music
- Leo Bloom in The Producers
- Steven Kovacs in The Cable Guy
- Alan Simon in Torch Song Trilogy
- Steven Schats in The Last Shot
- Nick Tatopoulos in Godzilla
- Walter Kresby in The Stepford Wives
- Slide in Tower Heist
- Jack McCall in A Thousand Words
- Ian Malcolm in The Lost World: Jurassic Park
- Willie Conway in Beautiful Girls
- William Kent in The General's Daughter
- Harry Sultenfuss in My Girl, My Girl 2
- Austin Millbarge in Spies Like Us
- Steven Mills in My Stepmother Is an Alien
- Brand Walsh in The Goonies
- Jamie Conway in Bright Lights, Big City
- Alex Finch in Chances Are
- Thomas J. Whitmore in Independence Day: Resurgence
- Ed Masterson in Wyatt Earp
- Peter Strahm in Saw IV, Saw V
- Gobler in Indiana Jones and the Raiders of the Lost Ark
- Malcolm in Dawn of the Planet of the Apes
- Delmar O’Donnell in O Brother, Where Art Thou?
