= Teo Bellia =

Italian actor (born 1960)

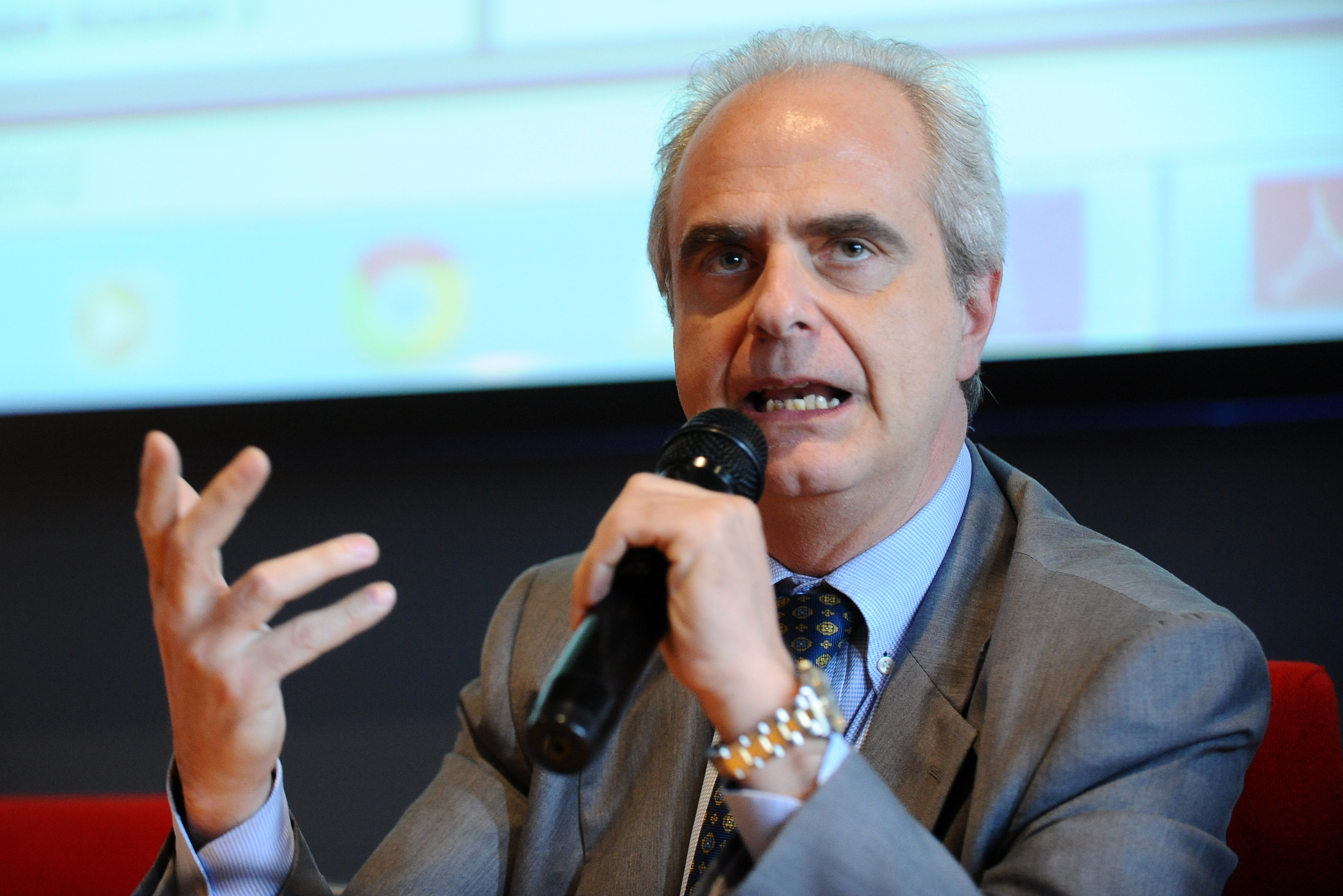
- Bellia in 2012
- Born: Teo Romano Bellia; 17 January 1960 (age 66); Rome, Italy
- Occupations: Actor; voice actor; dubbing director; radio presenter; journalist
- Years active: 1973–present

Teo Romano Bellia (born 17 January 1960) is an Italian actor, voice actor and journalist.

== Biography ==
Bellia began his career at 13 years of age as a disc jockey. He performed for several radio stations across Italy, most notably in Colleferro. As a journalist, Bellia worked for La7 from 1985 to 1986 (then called Telemontecarlo) and he even worked for Telemontecarlo's corresponding news shows from the 1980s to the early 2000s.

As a voice actor, Bellia serves as the official Italian voice of Tim Allen. He also voiced Moe Szyslak in the Italian dub of The Simpsons since the ninth season as well as dubbing Tom Tucker in Family Guy and He-Man in He-Man and the Masters of the Universe. He also provided the Italian voice of Marty McFly (portrayed by Michael J. Fox) in Back to the Future until he was replaced by Sandro Acerbo in the sequels.

== Filmography ==
=== Cinema ===
- One Hundred Days in Palermo (1984)
- Il generale Dalla Chiesa - TV miniseries (2007)
- Pinocchio (2012) - voice

== Dubbing roles ==
=== Animation ===
- He-Man in He-Man and the Masters of the Universe
- Tito in Oliver & Company
- Daffy Duck in Daffy Duck's Quackbusters
- Michelangelo, Daffy Duck and smoking guy in Cartoon All-Stars to the Rescue
- Moe Szyslak (episodes 6.3, 6.18, 6.22, 8.2, season 9 and on), Eddie (seasons 6-7), Fat Tony (season 10), Disco Stu (2nd voice), Gil Gunderson (seasons 10-17) in The Simpsons
- Dale in Disney productions (since 1990)
- Tom Tucker in Family Guy
- Morph in Treasure Planet
- Nigel in The Wild

=== Live action ===
- Eliot Arnold in Big Trouble
- Scott Calvin / Toy Santa in The Santa Clause 2
- Scott Calvin in The Santa Clause 3: The Escape Clause
- Dave Douglas in The Shaggy Dog
- Doug Madsen in Wild Hogs
- Officer George Hannagan in 11:14
- Tommy Zelda in Crazy on the Outside
- Marty McFly in Back to the Future
- Tom Paris in Star Trek: Voyager (seasons 5–7)
- Zed in Pulp Fiction
- Leo Getz in Lethal Weapon 2, Lethal Weapon 3, Lethal Weapon 4
- "Gator" Purify in Jungle Fever
- Pat Healy in There's Something About Mary
