= Italian destroyer Nazario Sauro =

Destroyer of the Regia Marina

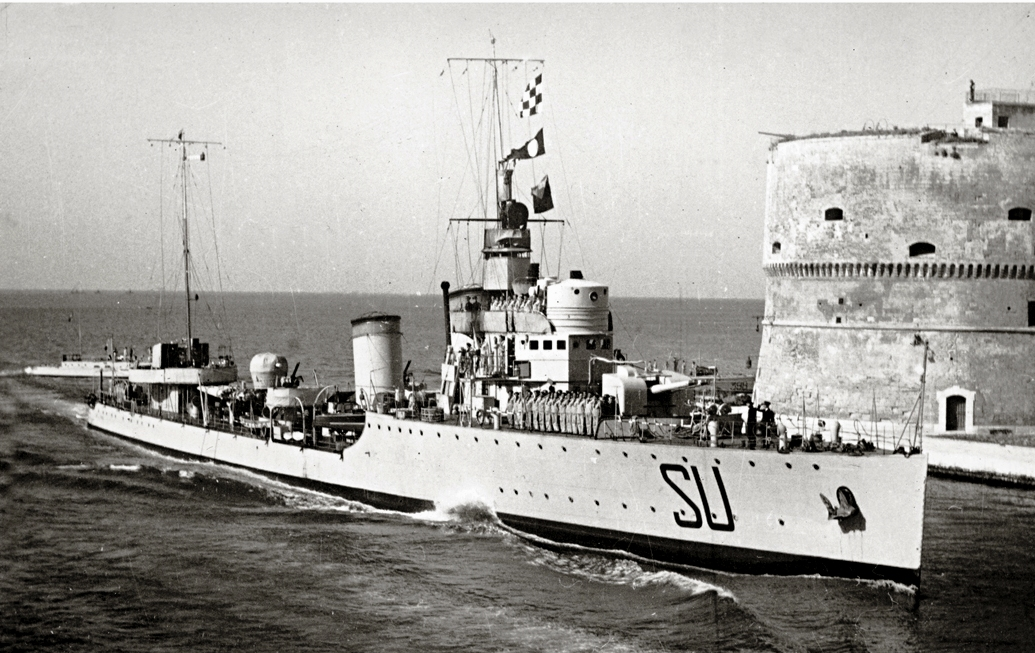
- Nazario Sauro

History

Kingdom of Italy
- Name: Nazario Sauro
- Namesake: Nazario Sauro
- Builder: Odero-Terni-Orlando, Sestri Ponente
- Laid down: 9 February 1924
- Launched: 12 May 1926
- Completed: 23 September 1926
- Fate: Sunk by aircraft, 3 April 1941

General characteristics (as built)
- Class & type: Sauro-class destroyer
- Displacement: 1,058 long tons (1,075 t) (standard); 1,600 long tons (1,600 t) (full load)
- Length: 90.16 m (295 ft 10 in)
- Beam: 9.2 m (30 ft 2 in)
- Draught: 2.9 m (9 ft 6 in)
- Installed power: 3 Yarrow boilers; 36,000 shp (27,000 kW)
- Propulsion: 2 shafts; 2 geared steam turbines
- Speed: 31 knots (57 km/h; 36 mph)
- Range: 2,600 nmi (4,800 km; 3,000 mi) at 14 knots (26 km/h; 16 mph)
- Complement: 155 (wartime)
- Armament: 2 × twin 120 mm (4.7 in) guns; 2 × single 40 mm (1.6 in) AA guns; 2 × single 13.2 mm (0.52 in) machine guns; 2 × triple 533 mm (21 in) torpedo tubes; 52 mines

Nazario Sauro was the lead ship of her class of four destroyers built for the Regia Marina (Royal Italian Navy) in the 1920s. Completed in 1926, she served in World War II.

== Design and description ==
The Sauro-class destroyers were enlarged and improved versions of the preceding Sella class. They had an overall length of 90.16 meters (296 ft), a beam of 9.2 meters (30 ft 2 in) and a mean draft of 2.9 meters (9 ft 6 in). They displaced 1,058 metric tons (1,041 long tons) at standard load, and 1,600 metric tons (1,570 long tons) at deep load. Their complement was 8–10 officers and 146 enlisted men.

The Sauros were powered by two Parsons geared steam turbines, each driving one propeller shaft using steam supplied by three Yarrow boilers. The turbines were rated at 36,000 shaft horsepower (27,000 kW) for a speed of 31 knots (57 km/h; 36 mph) in service, although Nazario Sauro reached a speed of 36.5 knots (67.6 km/h; 42.0 mph) from 37,000 shp (28,000 kW) during her sea trials while lightly loaded. The ships carried enough fuel oil to give them a range of 2,600 nautical miles (4,800 km; 3,000 mi) at a speed of 14 knots (26 km/h; 16 mph).

Their main battery consisted of four 120-millimeter (4.7 in) guns in two twin-gun turrets, one each fore and aft of the superstructure. Anti-aircraft (AA) defense for the Sauro-class ships was provided by a pair of 40-millimeter (1.6 in) AA guns in single mounts amidships and a pair of 13.2-millimeter (0.52 in) machine guns. They were equipped with six 533-millimeter (21 in) torpedo tubes in two triple mounts amidships. The Sauros could also carry 52 mines.

== Construction and career ==
Nazario Sauro was laid down by Odero-Terni-Orlando at their Genoa-Sestri Ponente shipyard on 9 February 1924, launched on 12 May 1926 and commissioned on 23 September 1926.

After entering service in 1926, Nazario Sauro served with the Regia Marina during the interwar period. By the mid-1930s she had been assigned to the Italian Red Sea Flotilla based at Massawa, Eritrea, as part of the 3rd Destroyer Squadron.

Following Italy’s entry into World War II in June 1940, she took part in operations in the Red Sea and during the East African Campaign against British naval forces and convoys. In April 1941, with the collapse of Italian East Africa imminent, Nazario Sauro was among the destroyers ordered to carry out a final attack against Port Sudan. The force was detected by British reconnaissance aircraft and repeatedly attacked by Fleet Air Arm Fairey Swordfish bombers on 3 April 1941. Nazario Sauro was hit by several 224kg bombs, capsized, and sank in the Red Sea at approximately 9:00 AM with the loss of 78 lives.

== Bibliography ==
- Brescia, Maurizio (2012). Mussolini's Navy: A Reference Guide to the Regina Marina 1930–45. Annapolis, Maryland: Naval Institute Press. ISBN 978-1-59114-544-8.
- Fraccaroli, Aldo (1968). Italian Warships of World War II. Shepperton, UK: Ian Allan. ISBN 0-7110-0002-6.
- McMurtrie, Francis E., ed. (1937). Jane's Fighting Ships 1937. London: Sampson Low. OCLC 927896922.
- O'Hara, Vincent P. (2009). Struggle for the Middle Sea: The Great Navies at War in the Mediterranean Theater, 1940–1945. Annapolis, Maryland: Naval Institute Press. ISBN 978-1-59114-648-3.
- Roberts, John (1980). "Italy". In Chesneau, Roger (ed.). Conway's All the World's Fighting Ships 1922–1946. New York: Mayflower Books. pp. 280–317. ISBN 0-8317-0303-2.
- Rohwer, Jürgen (2005). Chronology of the War at Sea 1939–1945: The Naval History of World War Two (Third Revised ed.). Annapolis, Maryland: Naval Institute Press. ISBN 1-59114-119-2.
- Whitley, M. J. (1988). Destroyers of World War 2: An International Encyclopedia. Annapolis, Maryland: Naval Institute Press. ISBN 1-85409-521-8.
