= Manfredonia (disambiguation) =

Manfredonia is a town in Italy and an Italian language name. It may also refer to:

== Places ==
- Gulf of Manfredonia
- Manfredonia Cathedral
- Manfredonia Lighthouse

== People ==
- Francesco Capuano Di Manfredonia, 15th century Italian astronomer
- Giulio Manfredonia (b. 1967), Italian film director and screenwriter
- Lionello Manfredonia (b. 1956), Italian footballer
- Valentino Manfredonia (b. 1989), Italian boxer

== Organizations ==
- Manfredonia Calcio, an association football club in Italy
