= Manfred on the Jungfrau (Madox Brown) =

Painting by Ford Madox Brown

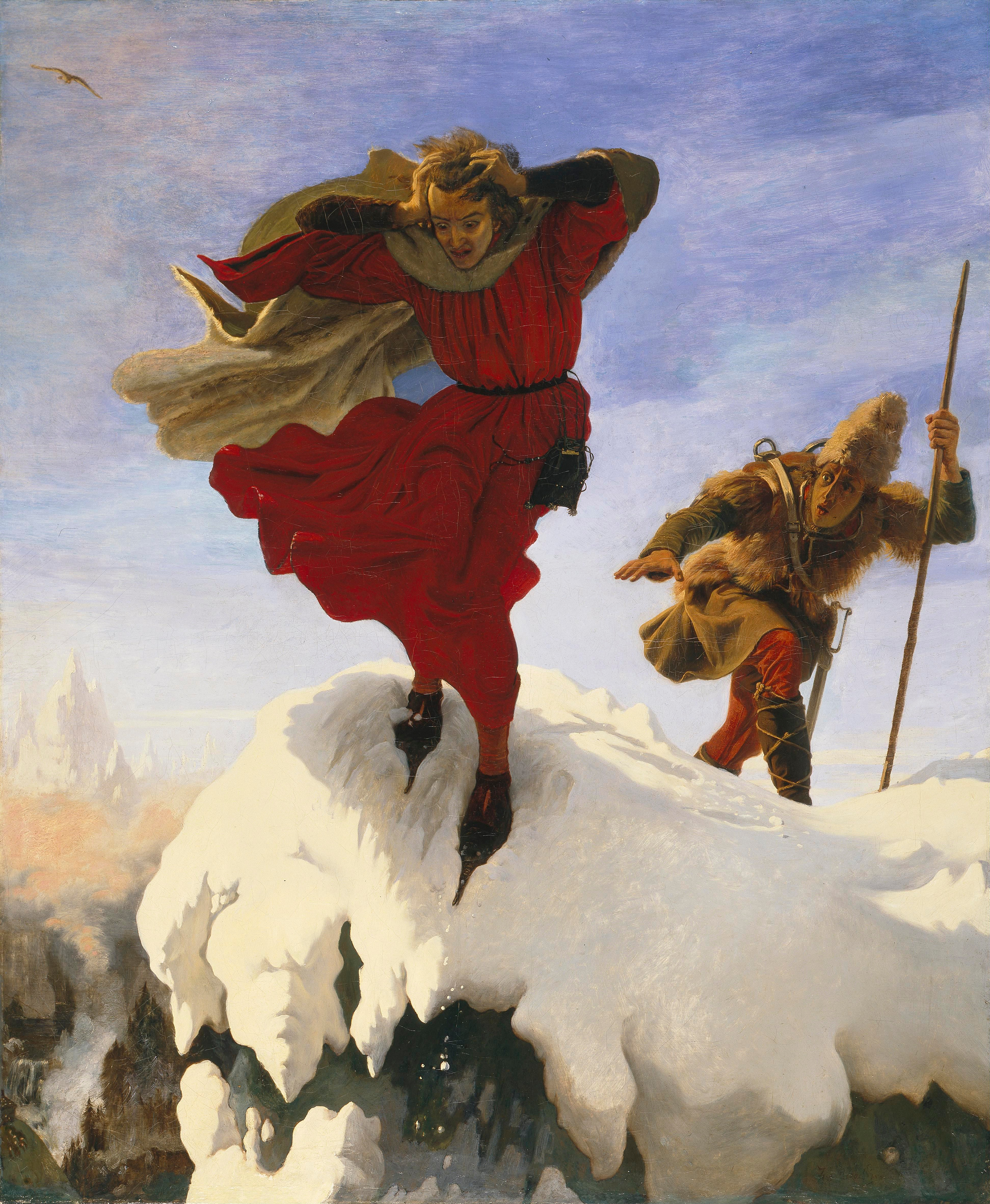
- Artist: Ford Madox Brown
- Year: 1842
- Medium: Oil on canvas
- Dimensions: 140.2 cm × 115 cm (55.2 in × 45 in)
- Location: Manchester Art Gallery; Manchester

Manfred on the Jungfrau is an 1842 oil-on-canvas painting by the British artist Ford Madox Brown. It is inspired by Act I Scene II of Lord Byron's dramatic poem Manfred, probably most particularly the following:

... And you, ye crags upon whose extreme edge

I stand, and on the torrent's brink beneath
Behold the tall pines dwindled as to shrubs
In dizziness of distance, when a leap,
A stir, a motion, even a breath, would bring
My breast upon its rocky bosom's bed
To rest for ever – wherefore do I pause?
... Thou winged and cloud-cleaving minister,
Whose happy flight is highest into heaven,
Well may'st thou swoop so near me ...
... How beautiful is all this visible world!
How glorious in its action and itself!

The painting depicts the central character of the poem, Manfred, who is a noble and wealthy aristocrat, about to toss himself from the heights of the Jungfrau mountain. Manfred is, however, saved from death by a chamois hunter who happens upon him, and who is seen approaching in the background of the painting, clad in fur. The detail seen on Manfred's face shows his deep psychological agony, and the reason for his desire for suicide.

In 1837, John Martin painted an artwork of the same name. Martin's version was a watercolour, and focused more on the Jungfrau mountain than on the detail of Manfred and the hunter.

== See also ==
- List of paintings by Ford Madox Brown
