= Francesco I Manfredi =

Lord of Faenza from 1313 to 1343

Francesco I Manfredi (died 29 May 1343) was the lord of Faenza from 1313 until his death. He was the son of Alberghetto (or Alberghettino) Manfredi, one of the main Guelph leaders of Romagna, from whom he inherited the lordships of Brisighella, Quarneto, and Baccagnano, to which Francesco added other lands starting from 1309.

He was capitano del popolo of Faenza from 4 January 1313 and of Imola from 9 November 1314. In 1319, he became the absolute lord of both cities, being ousted in 1327. He was able to regain Faenza briefly in 1340–1341, maintaining subsequently the title of patrician of the city.

He married Rengarda Malatesta, daughter of Malatesta I Malatesta of Rimini.

Francesco Manfredi died at Faenza in 1343. He left nine children, including the future seigniors of Faenza Alberghetto, Malatesta, and Riccardo.

Preceded by To the Papal States	Lord of Faenza; 1313–1327	Succeeded by Alberghetto I Manfredi
Preceded by Riccardo Manfredi	Lord of Faenza; 1340–1341	Succeeded by Giovanni Manfredi
