= Manfred (Schumann) =

Music by Robert Schumann based on Lord Byron's poetry

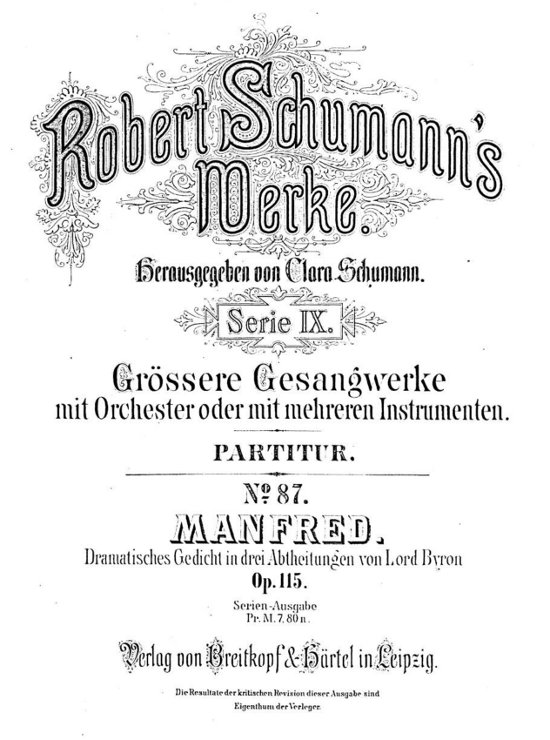
Collected Works Edition title page for Robert Schumann's Manfred, Op.115

Manfred: Dramatic Poem with Music in Three Parts (Opus 115) (German: Manfred. Dramatisches Gedicht in drei Abtheilungen) is a work of incidental music by Robert Schumann. The work is based on the 1817 poem Manfred by Lord Byron and consists of an overture, and 15 pieces of music: an entracte, melodramas, and several solos and choruses.

Written primarily in 1848, the overture was first performed at the Gewandhaus concert at Leipzig on 14 March 1852. The full work was then performed at the German National Theatre on 13 June 1852, with the orchestra conducted by Franz Liszt.

The most highly regarded piece in the work is the Overture. Composer Hugo Wolf wrote that the work "has brought the essence, the focal point of the drama to plastic expression with the simplest strokes." German-American psychiatrist and music historian Peter Ostwald wrote that the Overture was written during a time when Schumann was facing "exquisite suffering" from "inner voices," or auditory hallucinations.

The overture's orchestration consists of 2 flutes, 2 oboes, 2 B♭ clarinets, 4 French horns, 3 trumpets, 3 trombones, timpani, and the string ensemble. It is in E♭ minor (but notated with only 3 flats on the score) and common time, and it follows the sonata form.
