= Manfred (surname) =

Manfred is a surname.

Notable people with the name include:

- Ebanda Manfred (1935–2003), Cameroonian makossa singer
- Edmund Manfred (1856–1941), or E.C. Manfred, Australian architect
- Frederick Manfred (1912–1994), American writer of Westerns
- Freya Manfred (born 1944), American poet
- Marsden Manfred (1888–1951), Australian politician
- Rob Manfred (born 1958), American lawyer and baseball executive

== See also ==
- Manfredi
