= Calcagnini =

Calcagnini is an Italian surname. Notable people with the surname include:

- Celio Calcagnini (1479–1541), Italian humanist and scientist
- Guido Calcagnini (1725–1807), Italian cardinal and archbishop in the Roman Catholic Church
