= Taddeo Manfredi =

Lord of Imola from 1448 to 1473

Taddeo Manfredi (1431 – c. 1486) was Lord of Imola from 1448 until 1473. As a condottiere (mercenary leader), he was commander in the Florentine (1443–1448 and 1452) and Neapolitan (1448–1452) armies.

After inheriting the seigniory of Imola after the death of his father, Guidantonio Manfredi, he struggled long with his uncle Astorre II Manfredi, who held Faenza. The two reconciled in 1463, but the war resumed four years later. In 1467, after having been besieged in Imola by Alessandro and Costanzo Sforza, he fought in the Battle of Molinella.

In 1471, his son Guidoriccio rebelled against him, and Manfredi was imprisoned under the authority of the Milanese general Roberto da Sanseverino. In 1472, he was freed, but the city rebelled against him. The following year, he sold the city for 40,000 ducats to Cardinal Pietro Riario, who ceded it to Girolamo Riario. In 1482, he fought against the latter and was declared rebel by the Pope.

Preceded by Astorre II Manfredi	Lord of Imola; 1448–1473	Succeeded by Girolamo Riario
