= Manfredini =

Manfredini is an Italian surname. Notable people with the surname include:

- Achille Manfredini (1869–1920), Italian architect and engineer
- Aparicio Méndez Manfredini (1904–1988), Uruguayan politician
- Christian Manfredini (born 1975), Côte d'Ivoire-Italian footballer
- Elisabetta Manfredini-Guarmani (1780–after 1828), Italian opera singer
- Fernando Salinas Manfredini (born 1956), Chilean activist
- Francesco Manfredini (1684–1762), Italian Baroque composer, violinist, and church musician
- Harry Manfredini (born 1943), American musician
- Niccolò Manfredini (born 1988), Italian footballer
- Pedro Manfredini (1935–2019), Argentine footballer
- Renato Russo (1960–1996), Brazilian musician, birth name Renato Manfredini, Jr.
- Thomas Manfredini (born 1980), Italian footballer
- Vincenzo Manfredini (1737–1799), Italian composer, harpsichordist and music theorist
- Manfredini family of painters (Cremona) from the 18th and 19th centuries, included father Giovanni (1730–90), and his three sons, Paolo (1754–1805), Giuseppe, and Serafino

== See also ==
- Memorial Argo Manfredini, an Italian tennis tournament
