= Manfred on the Jungfrau (Martin) =

Painting by John Martin

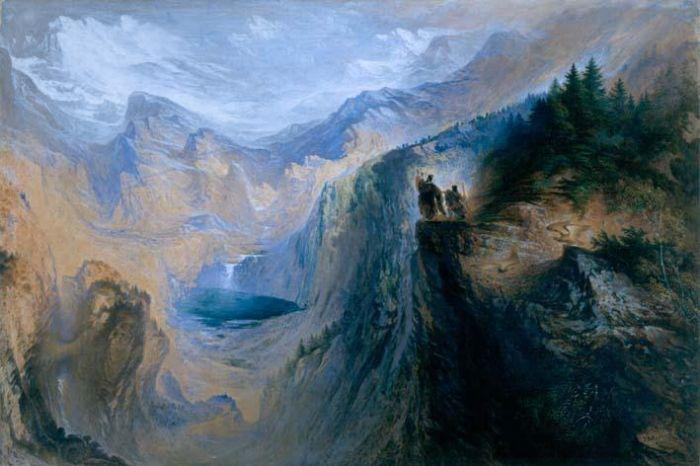
- Artist: John Martin
- Year: 1837
- Type: Watercolour
- Dimensions: 97.5 cm × 146 cm (38.4 in × 57.5 in)
- Location: Birmingham Museum and Art Gallery, Birmingham

Manfred on the Jungfrau is an 1837 watercolour painting by the English artist John Martin, now in Birmingham Museum and Art Gallery. The subject of the painting comes from Lord Byron's poem Manfred, specifically Act I scene II. It was painted by a number of 19th-century artists.

== Analysis ==
This work depicts Manfred preparing to throw himself from the Jungfrau mountain in the Alps. In Byron's poem he is pulled back from the edge just before leaping by a horrified chamois hunter, who then leads him back to safety. The relationship between Act I scene II of Byron's poem is evident; the episode taken from this scene is this:

...And you, ye crags upon whose extreme edge

I stand, and on the torrent's brink beneath
Behold the tall pines dwindled as to shrubs
In dizziness of distance, when a leap,
A stir, a motion, even a breath, would bring
My breast upon its rocky bosom's bed
To rest for ever - wherefore do I pause?
...Thou winged and cloud-cleaving minister,
Whose happy flight is highest into heaven,
Well may'st thou swoop so near me...
...How beautiful is all this visible world!

How glorious in its action and itself!

In the time that the artwork was created, 'man and nature' was a theme that was popular among romantic artists and writers, and influences of this are evident within this watercolour work. Images of figures standing on cliff tops, about to throw themselves off to their death were quite common among the artworks and writings which shared this theme.

Three years after Martin completed his version, Ford Madox Brown produced another painting entitled Manfred on the Jungfrau. This later oil-on-canvas version depicts Manfred up close, with his facial features and a look of horror clearly visible, as well as the same chamois hunter.
