= Monfreid =

Monfreid may refer to:

- George-Daniel de Monfreid (1856–1929), French painter and art collector
- Henry de Monfreid (1879–1974), French adventurer and author

== See also ==
- Manfred
