= Fabrizio Manfredi =

Italian voice actor (born 1967)

- Born: 20 December 1967 (age 58); Rome, Italy
- Occupations: Voice actor, adapter, dubbing director
- Spouse: Francesca Fiorentini (m. ?-2017)
- Children: 2
- Relatives: Massimiliano Manfredi (cousin); Sandro Acerbo (cousin); Rossella Acerbo (cousin); Maurizio Ancidoni (cousin)

Fabrizio Manfredi (born 20 December 1967) is an Italian voice actor.

== Biography ==
Manfredi often contributes to voicing characters in cartoons, movies, and other content. He is well known for providing the voice of the character Philip J. Fry in the Italian-language version of the animated sitcom Futurama. He also dubbed multiple characters in the Italian-language version of the anime series Little Pollon and Urusei Yatsura, Carl Chryniszzswics in the Italian-language version of the Cartoon Network animated series Johnny Bravo, as well as Megavolt in the Italian dub of Darkwing Duck and Tyler in the Italian-language version of the Canadian animated franchise Total Drama.

He was married to voice actress Francesca Fiorentini until 2017. He works at C.D. Cine Dubbing, Sefit - CDC, and other dubbing studios in Italy

== Voice work ==
- Blackbird in The Secret of the Old Woods
- Kinder Fetta al Latte and Kinder Paradiso in Kinder Fresh Adventures - video game (2001)

=== Dubbing roles ===
==== Animation ====
- Priam, Achilles, Pan, Triton, Tantalus, Perseus, Heracles, Orestes in Little Pollon
- Various characters in Urusei Yatsura
- Philip J. Fry in Futurama, Futurama: Bender's Big Score, Futurama: The Beast with a Billion Backs, Futurama: Bender's Game, Futurama: Into the Wild Green Yonder, The Simpsons
- Pip Pirrup (1st voice), Kyle Broflovski (2nd voice) and Leonardo DiCaprio in South Park (1st dub), Kyle in South Park: Bigger, Longer & Uncut
- Theo Huxtable / Malcolm-Jamal Warner, Kirk Cameron, Scooter and David Spade in Family Guy
- Tyler in Total Drama Island, Total Drama World Tour
- Mole in The Animals of Farthing Wood
- Kaname Ohgi in Code Geass: Lelouch of the Rebellion, Code Geass: Lelouch of the Rebellion R2
- Radley "Rad" Heeler in Bluey
- Keisuke Takahashi in Initial D
- Hikaru Matsuyama in Captain Tsubasa
- Zazie the Beast in Trigun
- Arthur in Georgie!
- Inuzuka Shino Moritaka in The Hakkenden
- Bagheera in The Jungle Book (TV series)
- Megavolt in Darkwing Duck
- Hank Pym/Ant-Man/Giant-Man in The Avengers: Earth's Mightiest Heroes
- Mario in Denver, the Last Dinosaur
- Shiro Kabuto in Mazinger Z
- Rock in Metropolis
- Carl Chryniszzswics in Johnny Bravo
- Brother Tuck in Young Robin Hood
- Private/Corporal/Sergeant/Lieutenant Juan "Johnny" Rico in Roughnecks: Starship Troopers Chronicles
- Derek in The Swan Princess (speaking voice), The Swan Princess II: Escape from Castle Mountain, The Swan Princess: The Mystery of the Enchanted Kingdom
- Van Fanal in The Vision of Escaflowne
- Lai in Sorcerous Stabber Orphen
- Rattrap in Beast Machines

==== Live action ====
- Joe Bennett in Lipstick Jungle
- Julian "Dice" Blac in Glitter
- Theodore Aloysius "Theo" Huxtable in The Cosby Show
- Frank Churchill in Emma
- Billy Brennan in Jurassic Park III
- Sean Boswell in The Fast and the Furious: Tokyo Drift
- Edward Scissorhands in Edward Scissorhands
- Edward "Ned" T. Malone in Sir Arthur Conan Doyle's The Lost World
- Percy Wetmore in The Green Mile
- Glenn Morrison in Trauma (U.S. TV series)
- Jim Moriarty in Sherlock (TV series)
- Henry Denton in Gosford Park
- Michael Aaron "Mike" Seaver in Growing Pains
- Dr. Douglas "Doogie" Howser in Doogie Howser, M.D.
- Ricky Butler in The 'Burbs
- Detective I Paul Diskant in Street Kings
- Barry in Fly Away Home
- Zachary "Zack" Siler in She's All That
- Tom Jeter in Studio 60 on the Sunset Strip
- Rusty in The Adventures of Rin Tin Tin (Second dub)
- Nikolai in Jennifer's Body
- Horstmayer in Joyeux Noël
- Bob Sugar in Jerry Maguire
- Kruger in Jarhead

==== Video games ====
- Philip J. Fry in Futurama

== Work as a dubbing director ==
- Conan the Barbarian (2011 film)
- Outside the Law (2010 film)
- Shredderman Rules
- Who Is Cletis Tout?
- The Devil's Rejects
- Judging Amy
- Line of Fire (2003 TV series)
- Heist (TV series)
