= Manfred (drama) =

Dramatic poem by Lord Byron, 1816–1817

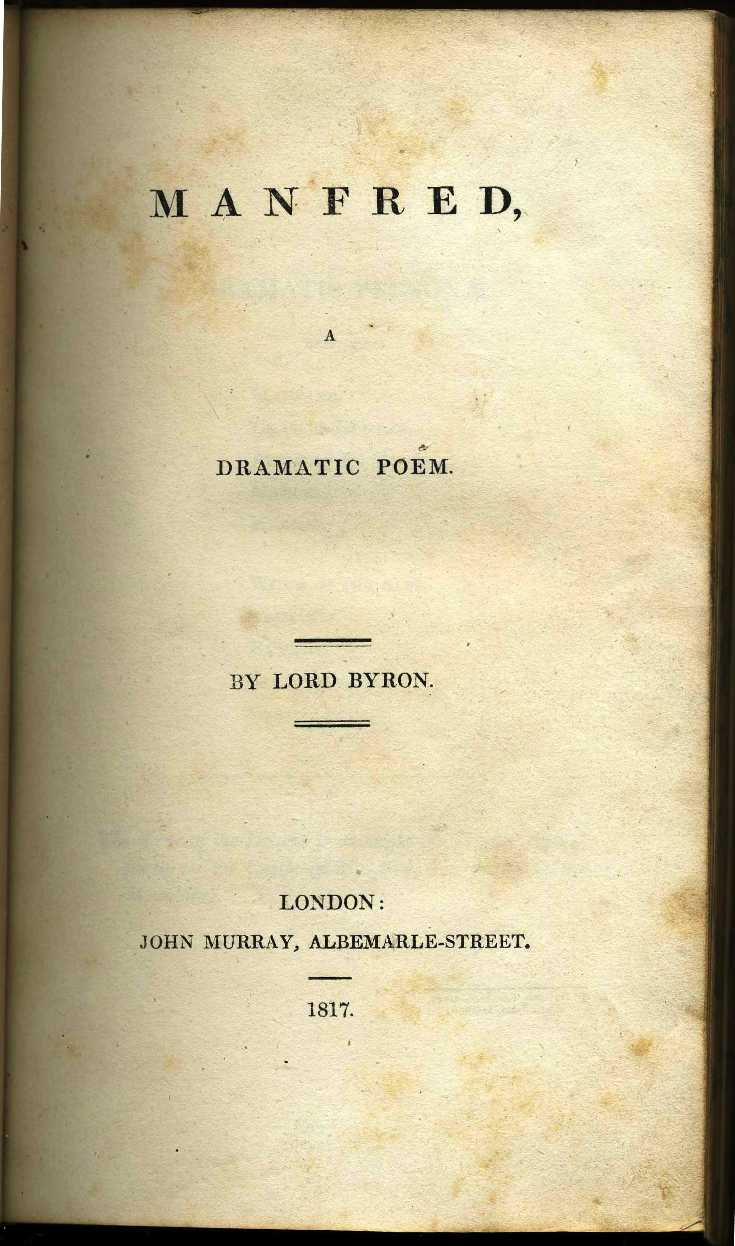
1817 first edition, John Murray, London.

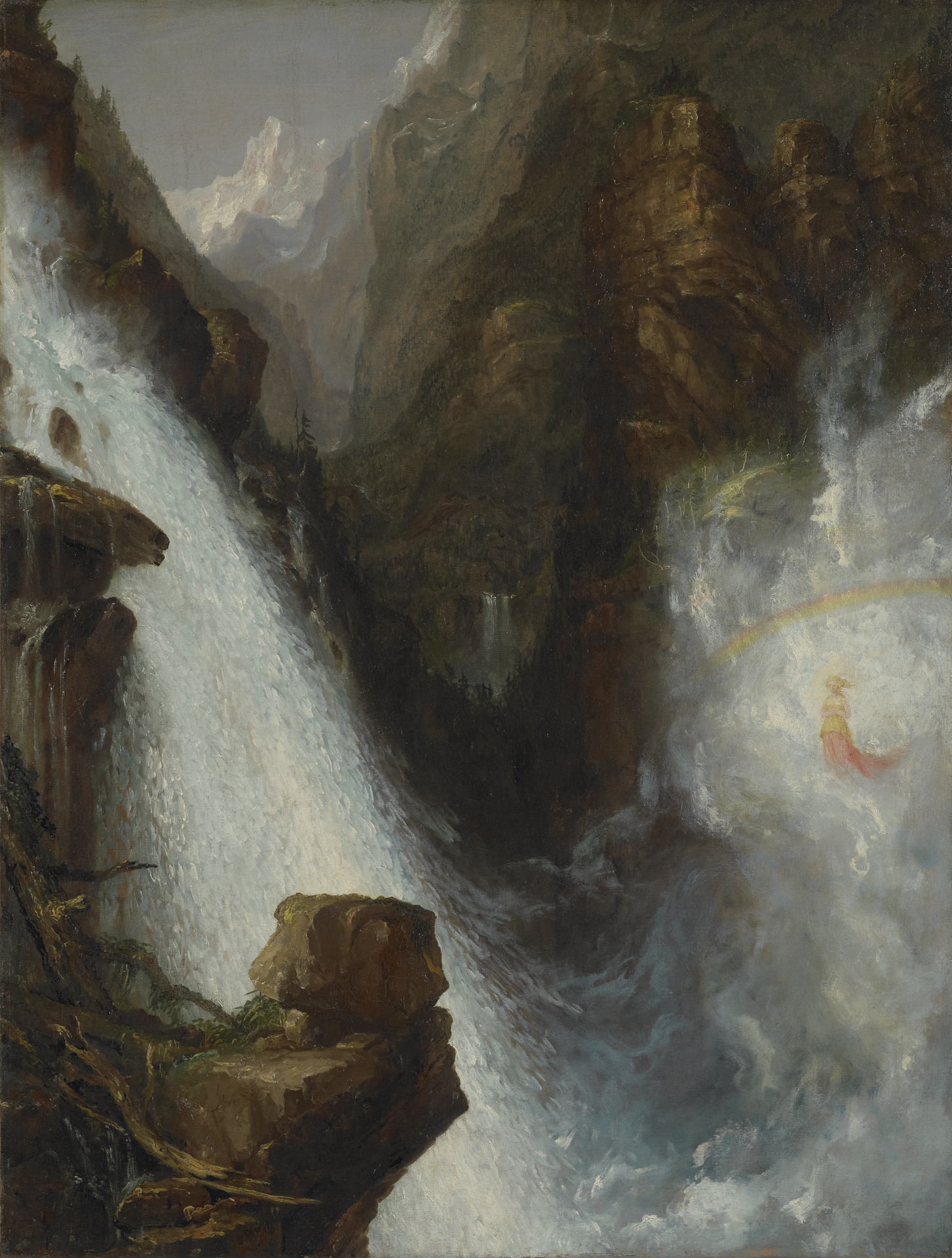
Scene from Byron's "Manfred", by Thomas Cole, 1833

Manfred: A dramatic poem is a closet drama written in 1816–1817 by Lord Byron. It contains supernatural elements, in keeping with the popularity of the ghost story in England at the time. It is a typical example of Gothic fiction.

Byron commenced this work in late 1816, a few months after the famous ghost-story sessions with Percy Bysshe Shelley and Mary Shelley that provided the initial impetus for Frankenstein; or, The Modern Prometheus. The supernatural references are made clear throughout the poem.

Manfred was adapted musically by Robert Schumann in 1848–1849, in a composition entitled Manfred: Dramatic Poem with Music in Three Parts, and in 1885 by Pyotr Ilyich Tchaikovsky in his Manfred Symphony. Friedrich Nietzsche was inspired by the poem's depiction of a super-human being to compose a piano score in 1872 based on it, "Manfred Meditation".

== Background ==
Byron wrote this "metaphysical drama", as he called it, after his marriage to Annabella Millbanke failed because of a scandal due to charges of sexual improprieties and an incestuous affair between Byron and his half-sister, Augusta Leigh. Attacked by the press and ostracised by London society, Byron fled England for Switzerland in 1816 and never returned. At the time, he was living at the Villa Diodati in Switzerland.

Because Manfred was written immediately after this, and because it concerns a main character tortured by his own sense of guilt for an unmentionable offence, some critics consider it to be autobiographical, or even confessional. The unnamed, but forbidden, nature of Manfred's relationship to Astarte is believed to represent Byron's relationship with his half-sister Augusta.

Most of Manfred was written on a tour through the Bernese Alps in September 1816. The third act was rewritten in February 1817, since Byron was not happy with its first version.

== Plot ==
Manfred is a Faustian noble living in the Bernese Alps. Internally tortured by some mysterious guilt, which has to do with the death of his most beloved, Astarte, he uses his mastery of language and spell-casting to summon seven spirits, from whom he seeks forgetfulness. The spirits, who rule the various components of the corporeal world, are unable to control past events and thus cannot grant Manfred's plea. For some time, fate prevents him from escaping his guilt through suicide.

At the end, Manfred dies, defying religious temptations of redemption from sin. Throughout the poem he succeeds in challenging all of the authoritative powers he faces, and chooses death over submitting to the powerful spirits. Manfred directs his final words to the Abbot, remarking, "Old man! 'tis not so difficult to die". "The unconquerable individual to the end, Manfred gives his soul to neither heaven nor hell, only to death."

== Critique ==
Published in June 1817, Manfred has as its epigraph the famous saying from Shakespeare's Hamlet: "There are more things in heaven and earth, Horatio, than are dreamt of in your philosophy." It seems to be strongly influenced by Goethe's Faust, which Byron probably read in translation (although he claimed never to have read it).

In September 1817, John Neal accused Byron of "egotism, contradiction, and affection" in authoring Manfred, claiming that "Byron was made for crime, not vice." Aside from pointing out the poem's absurdities, Neal nevertheless offered high praise and claimed of one verse that "our language does not furnish a more delicate, beautiful, mellow, and quiet picture."

Manfred has as its theme defiant humanism, represented by the hero's refusal to bow to supernatural authority. Peter L. Thorslev Jr. notes that Manfred conceals behind a Gothic exterior the tender heart of the Hero of Sensibility; but as a rebel, like Satan, Cain, and Prometheus, he embodies Romantic self-assertion.

== Characters ==
- Manfred
- Astarte
- Chamois Hunter
- Abbot of St. Maurice
- Manuel
- Herman
- Witch of the Alps
- Arimanes
- Nemesis
- The Destinies
- The Seven Spirits

== In performance ==
Manfred was not originally intended for stage performance; it was written to be a dramatic poem or, as Byron called it, a "metaphysical" drama. It has received much more attention on stage for its musical treatments by Tchaikovsky and Schumann than it has on its own dramatic terms. Nevertheless, Manfred was later famously played by Samuel Phelps.

There are no recorded full stagings in Britain in the twentieth century, but readings are more popular, partly because of the difficulty of staging a play set in the Alps, partly because of the work's nature as a closet drama that was never actually intended for the stage in the first place. The exceptional size of the role of Manfred also makes the play difficult to cast. There was a production on BBC Radio 3 in 1988, however, which starred Ronald Pickup as Manfred. A new production, adapted and directed by Pauline Harris with original music composed and performed by Olly Fox and starring Joseph Millson as Manfred, was broadcast on BBC Radio 3 on 8 January 2017 to celebrate the 200th anniversary of Manfred's completion.

A ballet based on the poem was originally presented by the Ballet de l'Opéra de Paris in 1979 choreographed by Rudolf Nureyev featuring music by Tchaikovsky. The Manfred ballet was revised by Nureyev for the Ballett des Opernhauses in Zürich in 1981. A recording of the Opéra's 1986 revival incorporated some of the changes made then.

== Scenes ==
- Act I
  - Scene I: Manfred alone—Scene, a Gothic gallery—Time, Midnight.
  - Scene II: The Mountain of the Jungfrau.—Time, Morning.—Manfred alone upon the Cliffs.
- Act II
  - Scene I: A Cottage amongst the Bernese Alps. Manfred and the Chamois Hunter.
  - Scene II: A lower Valley in the Alps.—A Cataract.
  - Scene III: The Summit of the Jungfrau Mountain.
  - Scene IV: The Hall of Arimanes—Arimanes on his Throne, a Globe of Fire, surrounded by the Spirits.
- Act III
  - Scene I: A Hall in the Castle of Manfred.
  - Scene II: Another Chamber. Manfred and Herman.
  - Scene III: The Mountains.—The Castle of Manfred at some distance.—A Terrace before a Tower.—Time, Twilight. Herman, Manuel, and other Dependants of Manfred.
  - Scene IV: Interior of the Tower.

== Manfred in literature ==
The character Manfred was mentioned by Alexandre Dumas, père in his novel The Count of Monte Cristo, where the Count declares: "No, no, I wish to do away with that mysterious reputation that you have given me, my dear viscount; it is tiresome to be always acting Manfred. I wish my life to be free and open."

Fyodor Dostoyevsky mentions the poem in Notes from Underground when the narrator states, "I received countless millions and immediately gave them away for the benefit of humanity, at the same moment confessing before the crowd all my infamies, which, of course, were not mere infamies, but also contained within them a wealth of 'the lofty and the beautiful' of something Manfred-like" (Bantam Books, 2005, page 57).

Herman Melville references the poem twice in Mardi (1849): in Chapter 4 describing being up in the foremast-head: "Now this standing upon a bit of stick 100 feet aloft for hours at a time, swiftly sailing over the sea, is very much like crossing the Channel in a balloon. Manfred-like, you talk to the clouds: you have a fellow feeling for the sun."; and in Chapter 11 wondering at a character's gravity: "It was inconceivable, that his reveries were Manfred-like and exalted, reminiscent of unutterable deeds, too mysterious even to be indicated by the remotest of hints." The whale-boat used to escape in the beginning is named "Chamois," referring explicitly to the goat-antelope creature, and likely also alluding to the hunter in Manfred.

In Act II of Ivanov by Anton Chekhov, Ivanov compares himself to Manfred, saying: "I could die of shame at the thought that I, a healthy, strong man, have turned into some sort of Hamlet, or Manfred, or superfluous man—God only knows what!" (Chekhov, Anton. The Major Plays. 1964. Translated by Ann Dunnigan, Signet Classics, 2006, page 40).

On page 61 of The Crying of Lot 49 by Thomas Pynchon, Di Presso seems to refer (perhaps by accident) to Metzger as Manfred.

Manfred's oft-quoted speech from Act II Scene 1 which begins "Think'st thou existence doth depend on time?" is quoted on page 351 of The Masters of Solitude by Marvin Kaye and Parke Godwin.

"In Memory of My Feelings", the poem by Frank O'Hara, includes the line "Manfred climbs to my nape,/ speaks, but I do not hear him,/ I'm too blue."

In Jonathan Strange & Mr Norrell by Susanna Clarke, Byron is said to have written Manfred after meeting the magician Jonathan Strange and finding him most disagreeable. It is suggested that he wrote it because he was so disappointed with Strange that he created a magician more to his liking.

The final scene of Daisy Miller by Henry James is set in the Colosseum of Rome. James mentions that, before entering the Colosseum, his protagonist Winterbourne loudly quotes Manfred's monologue on the Colosseum (Act III, Scene IV).

== Other references to Manfred ==
In the Gilbert and Sullivan comic opera Patience, Manfred is referenced in Colonel Calverley's patter song "If you want a receipt for that popular mystery" (A Heavy Dragoon), listing one ingredient as "a little of Manfred but not very much of him".

German gothic metal band The Vision Bleak extensively quote from Manfred in their song "A Curse of the Grandest Kind", on their 2010 album Set Sail to Mystery.

Big Finish's Dark Shadows references the tale in an audio production, Dress Me in Dark Dreams. Edith Collins seeks to re-read the poem after some lines are stuck in her head.

Christopher Tin and Shoji Kameda (as "Stereo Alchemy") used the text of Manfred as the basis for the lyrics to Monster of the Sky on their album God of Love.

Manfred Township, Minnesota is named after Manfred.

== See also ==
- Robert Schumann's setting of Manfred
- Tchaikovsky's Manfred Symphony
- Manfred on the Jungfrau by Ford Madox Brown
- Manfred on the Jungfrau, by John Martin
- Thomas Cole's 1833 painting Scene from Byron's "Manfred" (1833)
