= Giovanni Manfredi =

Lord of Faenza from 1341 to 1356

Giovanni Manfredi (1324–1373) was lord of Faenza from 1341 until 13 September 1356, as well as of numerous other minor fiefs in Romagna.

He was born in Imola, the illegitimate son of Riccardo Manfredi, and fought for Mastino II della Scala against John of Bohemia. In 1351 he was hired by Bernabò Visconti in his war against Bologna and the Papal forces, and was excommunicated the following year.

In 1356, after a long resistance together with his ally Francesco II Ordelaffi of Forlì, a crusade was declared against them. He was soon forced to surrender Faenza to the Papal commander, Cardinal Gil de Albornoz. In 1361 he rebelled again, but his plans to conquer Faenza and Imola were discovered.

He died at Pistoia in 1373.

Preceded by Riccardo Manfredi	Lord of Faenza; 1340–1356	Succeeded by To the Papal States
