= Galeotto Manfredi =

Italian politician (1440–1488)

Galeotto Manfredi (1440 – 31 May 1488) was an Italian condottiero and lord of Faenza.

Born in Faenza, Romagna, he was the son of Astorre II Manfredi. In 1477, after a failed attempt at military conquest, he succeeded as lord of Faenza to his brother Carlo, taking advantage of a rebellion against him. In his youth years, he had fought under the famous condottiero Bartolomeo Colleoni for the Republic of Venice. In 1483, he was made commander of the Florentine Army, and fought in the Wars in Lombardy.

In 1481, he married Francesca Bentivoglio, daughter of Giovanni II Bentivoglio, lord of Bologna. Galeotto was killed by her in an attack of jealousy in May 1488. He was succeeded by his son Astorre.

Italian nobility
Preceded by Carlo II	Lord of Faenza; 1477–1488	Succeeded by Astorre III
