= Girolamo Manfredi =

Italian philosopher, physician and astronomer

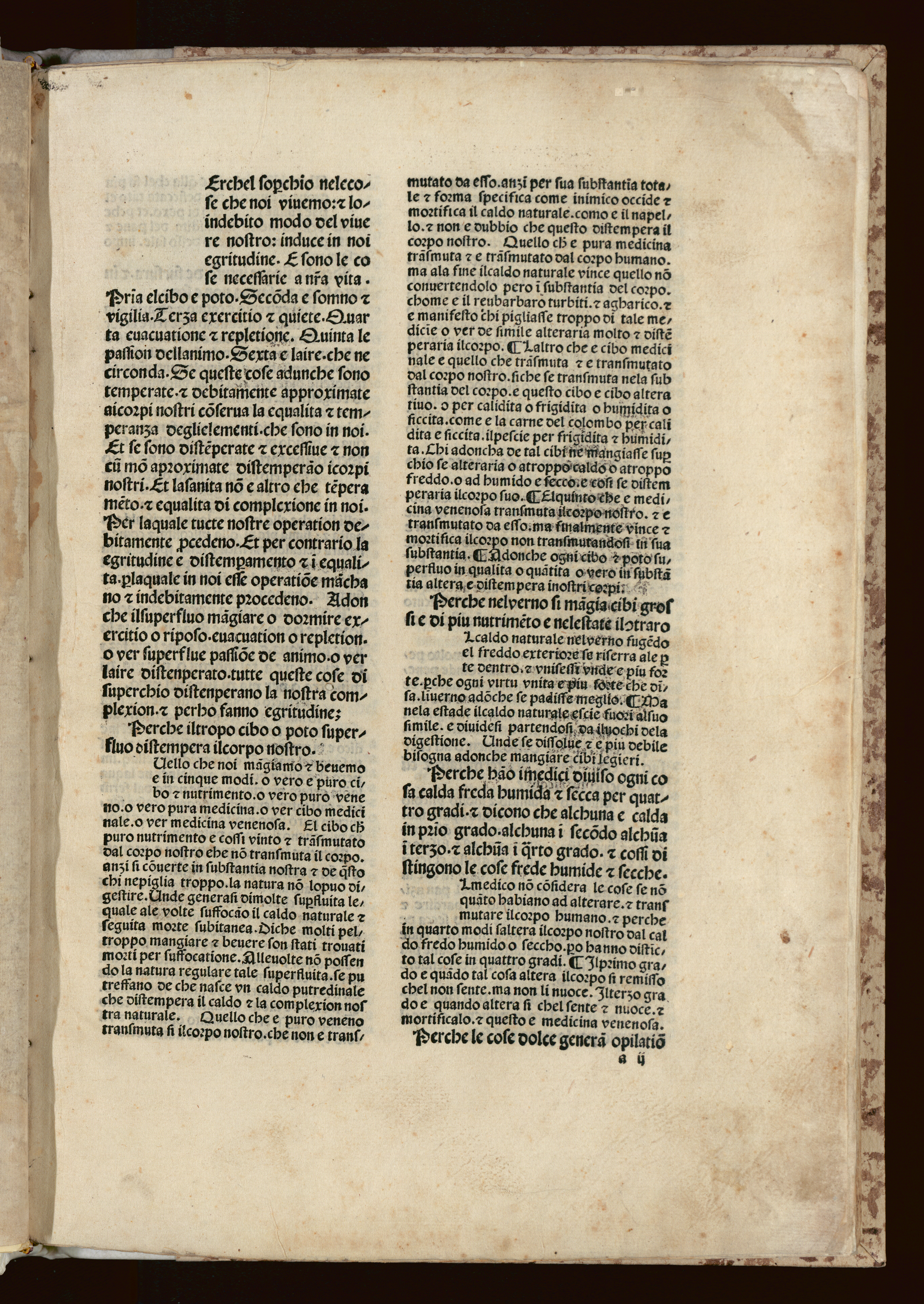
Liber de homine, 1497

Girolamo Manfredi or Hieronimus de Manfredis (1430–1493) was an Italian philosopher, physician and astronomer.

He lived and worked in Bologna, becoming a notable citizen.

== Life ==
Born in Bologna in a family of lawyers, he led his studies in his hometown, in Ferrara, where he graduated in 1455, and in Parma, where he completed his Ph.D. He taught Logic and other disciplines in Bologna for the rest of his life.

He entered the minor orders, and he had the tonsure in 1459.

He disputed with Giovanni Pico della Mirandola and worked together with Cola Montano and Galeotto Marzio. Manfredi died in Bologna during the summer of 1493.

He wrote his works both in Latin and vernacular. His most acclaimed book is Liber de homine (Il Perché).

== Works ==
- Manfredi, Girolamo (1478). Tractato de la pestilentia (in Italian). Bologna: Johann Schriber.
- Manfredi, Girolamo (1489). Prognosticon anni 1490 (in Italian). Bologna: Bazaliero Bazalieri.
- Manfredi, Girolamo (1497). Liber de homine (in Italian). Impressum Bononiae: Ugo Ruggeri.
