= Astorre III Manfredi =

Lord of Faenza from 1488 to 1501

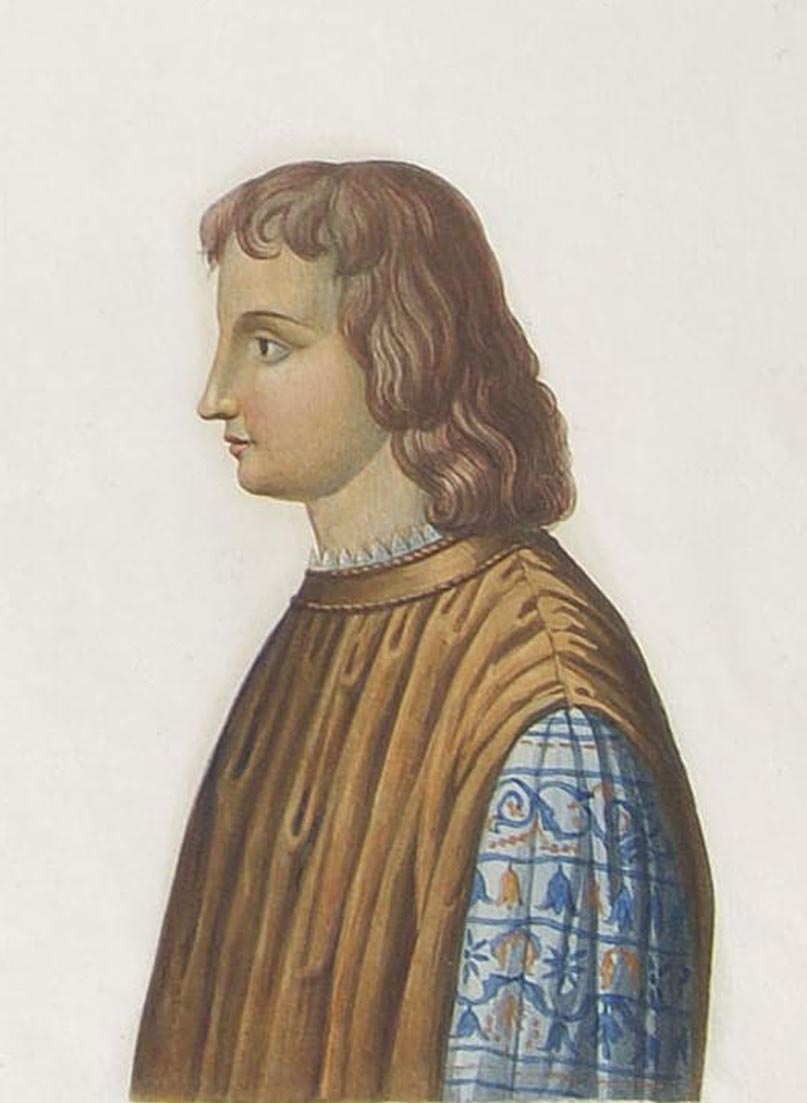
- Portrait of Manfredi
- Predecessor: Galeotto Manfredi
- Successor: Cesare Borgia
- Born: 20 June 1485; Faenza, Italy
- Died: 9 June 1502 (aged 16); Rome
- Noble family: Manfredi family
- Spouse: Bianca Riario
- Father: Galeotto Manfredi
- Mother: Francesca Bentivoglio

Astorre III Manfredi (June 20, 1485 – June 9, 1502) was lord of Faenza, in northern Italy, from 1488 to 1501.

He was born in Faenza, the son of Galeotto Manfredi and Francesca Bentivoglio, daughter of the lord of Bologna Giovanni II Bentivoglio and Ginevra Sforza. He succeeded his father in the lordship of Faenza in 1488 at the age of three. After his twelfth birthday he was betrothed to Bianca Riario, daughter of Caterina Sforza, a political manoeuvre that strengthened the already solid relationship between the Manfredi and Sforza families.

Astorre grew up in his family palace with his step-brothers Giovanni Evangelista and Francesco, born from Galeotto Manfredi relationship with Cassandra Pavoni, and was known for his attractiveness and courtesy.

His youth and upbringing was relatively quiet until the start of the Italian Wars: in 1500 Cesare Borgia besieged Faenza which at first resisted, but then in April 1501 capitulated and the young lord Astorre was deposed by Cesare Borgia himself and sent to Rome.

With Giovanni Evangelista he was confined in the Castel Sant'Angelo for almost an year and with a treatment appropriate to their rank, but the year after they were both assassinated: the two siblings bodies were found in the Tiber in June 1502, just shorlty before Astorre's seventeenth birthday,. His title as lord of Faenza passed to his step-brother Francesco, who reigned for almost an year with the name of Astorre IV Manfredi.

Italian nobility
| Preceded by Galeotto Manfredi | Lord of Faenza; 1488–1501 | Succeeded by Cesare Borgia |
