= Astorre II Manfredi =

Lord of Faenza and Imola

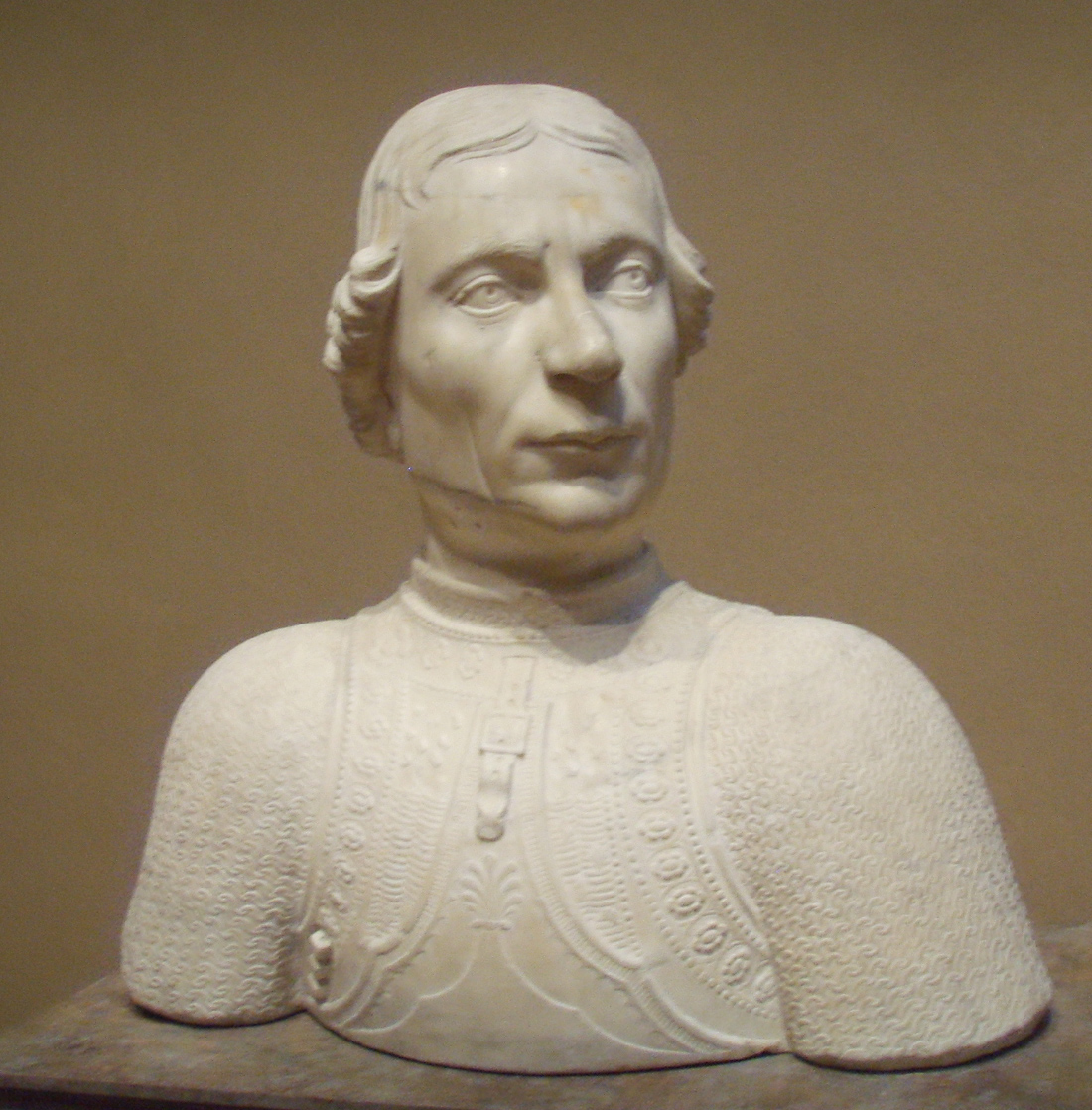
Portrait of Astorre II Manfredi by Mino da Fiesole (1455, National Gallery of Art, Washington D.C.

Astorre II Manfredi (8 December 1412 – 12 March 1468) was lord of Imola from 1439 and of Faenza from 1443.

He was born in Faenza, the son of Gian Galeazzo I Manfredi. Apart from Faenza and Imola, he was Papal vicar at Fusignano and other lands in Romagna together with his brother Gian Galeazzo II. He also fought as a captain for several local rulers.

In 1431, he married Giovanna da Barbiano, daughter of the famous condottiero Alberico da Barbiano. After his death, the executor of his will was the Republic of Venice. His sons Carlo and Galeotto were both lords of Faenza after Astorre's death.

Italian nobility
Preceded by to the Duchy of Milan	Lord of Imola; 1439–1448	Succeeded by Taddeo Manfredi
Preceded by Guidantonio Manfredi	Lord of Faenza; 1443–1468; With: Giangaleazzo II Manfredi 1443-1465	Succeeded by Carlo II Manfredi
