= Carlo II Manfredi =

Lord of Faenza

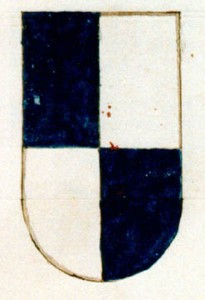

Carlo II Manfredi (1439–1484) was a lord of Faenza, in northern Italy.

Born in Faenza, Romagna, he was the son of Astorre II Manfredi. He succeeded the latter in 1468 as Papal vicar in the city and its neighbourhood. In 1471, Carlo married Costanza da Varano, the daughter of Rodolfo da Varano, Lord of Camerino.

He left the lordship of Faenza in 1477 and died in Rimini in 1484.

Italian nobility
Preceded by Astorre II	Lord of Faenza; 1468–1477	Succeeded by Galeotto Manfredi
