= Guidantonio Manfredi =

Lord of Faenza

Guidantonio Manfredi (also known as Guidaccio) (1407 – 20 June 1448) was lord of Faenza and Imola in the early 15th century. He was also a condottiero.

He was born in Faenza, the son of Gian Galeazzo I Manfredi, and inherited his lands in Romagna, ruling first in association with his brother, Carlo, and later alone. From 1439, he was also lord of Imola and Modigliana. He was married to Bianchina Trinci, daughter of Niccolò, lord of Foligno, until her assassination in 1441. The following year, he remarried to Agnese, daughter of Guidantonio I da Montefeltro, lord of Urbino.

As a condottiero, he was captain of the Republic of Florence in 1430 and of Francesco I Sforza in 1433.

He died at Bagni di Petriolo. He was succeeded by his brother Astorre.

Italian nobility
Preceded by Gian Galeazzo I Manfredi	Lord of Faenza; 1417–1424	Succeeded by Filippo Maria Visconti
Preceded by Filippo Maria Visconti	Lord of Faenza; 1426–1443	Succeeded by Astorre II Manfredi
