= Siege of Buda (1602) =

- Part of the Long Turkish War
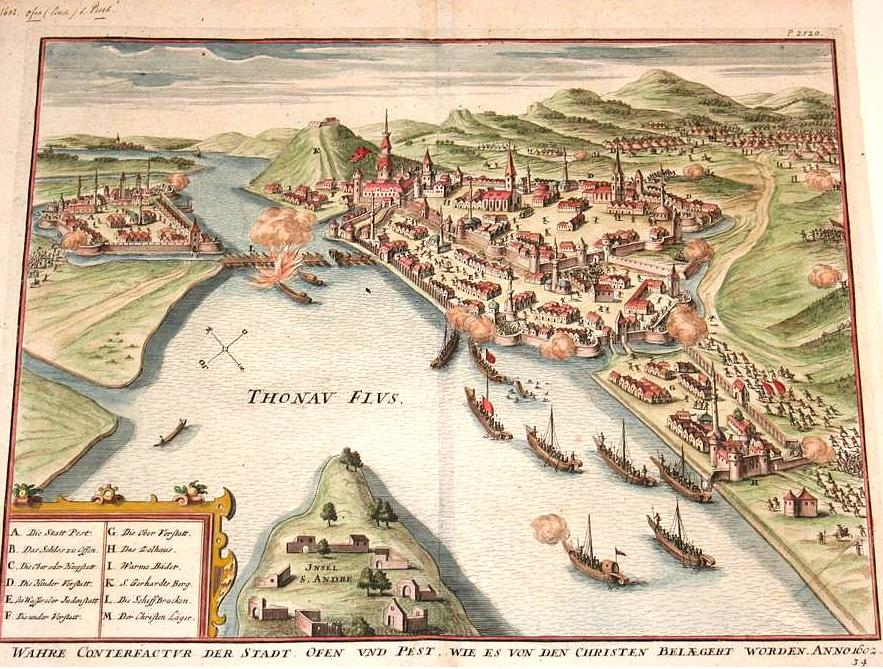
- Siege of Buda 1602
Date	2 October – 14 November 1602
Location	Buda, Hungary
Result	Ottoman victory

Belligerents
(Holy Roman Empire) Habsburg Empire; Kingdom of Hungary	Ottoman Empire

Commanders and leaders
(Holy Roman Empire) Archduke Matthias (Holy Roman Empire) Christof von Russwurm (Holy Roman Empire) Hannibal Kratz; Ferenc Nádasdy; Eörsy Péter	Yemişçi Hasan Pasha

Strength
20,000–24,000 men	Buda garrison 5,000–10,000 men Pest garrison 1,000–1,500 men Reinforcements; 20,000–30,000 men

Casualties and losses
Heavy	Heavy

The siege of Buda took place in 1602 during the Long Turkish War and was the second of three attempts to capture the town by the Habsburgs; however, it ended in failure, despite the Habsburg capture of Pest.

== Background ==
The Ottomans achieved success in 1600, when, following a battle, the defenders of Kanizsa were forced to give up the castle primarily due to a shortage of men and supplies. The imperial force had to be split the following year as a result. But while the Habsburgs made fruitless attempts to retake Kanizsa, the Duke Mercoeur, having led the Turks to believe that he was getting ready to attack Buda, suddenly materialized under Székesfehérvár and drove the defenders into capitulation after ten days. The Christians now held the primary advantages of Buda's direct defense ring. Székesfehérvár was retaken by Grand Vizier Hassán Yemişçi's 70,000-man army on August 29, 1602.

There was much fear following Székesfehérvár's fall, particularly in Vienna and Prague, where people thought Hassan Pasha would now turn against the Pope and launch an invasion of Austria from there. But the Grand Vizier moved part of his army to raid the palace, ordered 4,000 men to the occupied castle, and camped the remainder between Székesfehérvár and Buda.

Archduke Matthias convened a council of war in the Győr camp on September 4, ostensibly in response to the field marshal, Christof von Russwurm. There, the decision to lay siege to Buda was made. On September 9, after examining the gathered army, he left again for Vienna. On September 20, Russwurm and his army of between 20,000 and 24,000 men left Győr and crossed the Danube's left bank, moving at an almost unfathomably slow pace, first to Esztergom and then on to Buda, in accordance with the war council's decision.

== Siege ==
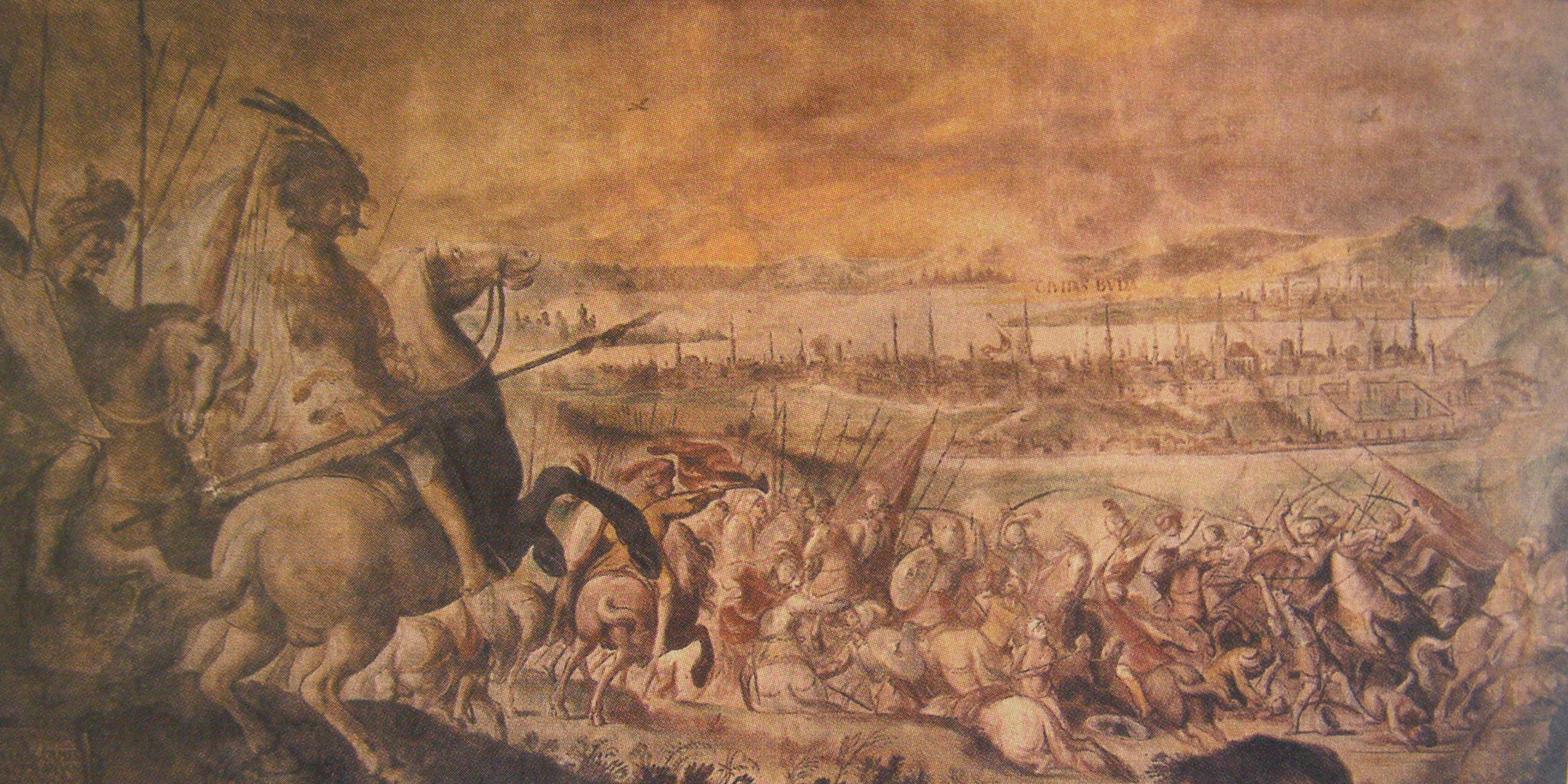
Siege of Buda (1602), painting in the castle of Sárvár

The siege of Buda began on October 2. There were about 5,000–10,000 Turks in Buda, while Pest was defended by 1,000–1,500 men. Field Marshal Russwurm first made the decision to attack the bridge that connected Pest and Buda. They had to seize the Pest bridgehead and use a fire engine to crush the bridge. Upon noticing this, the Ottomans hurried in groups down the Danube to save the bridge that was in danger. Their efforts, though, were in vain, and the bridge was destroyed.

The field marshal then made the decision to take Pest, whose execution he scheduled for the evening of October 5–6. With great success, the Habsburgs launched attacks on the walls from both land and sea. By midday on October 7, the remaining defenders were forced to retreat behind two round bastions. They were transported to Buda by boat by Nádasdy Ferenc's soldiers. Russwurm appointed Eörsy Péter, a well-known warrior, as the Captain of Pest. The boat bridge was then rebuilt.

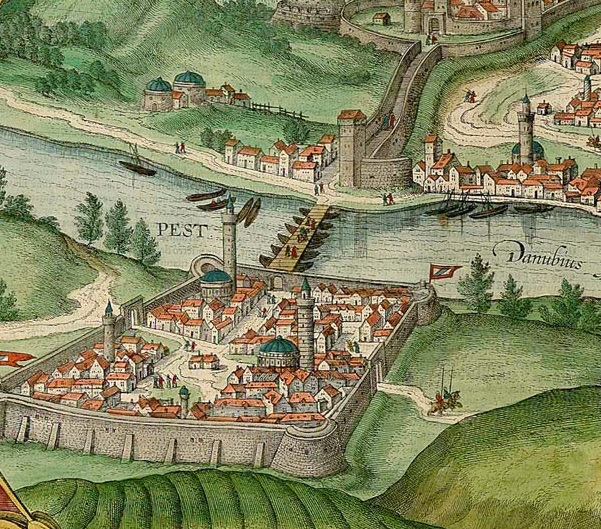
Pest during Ottoman rule, 1616.

Meanwhile, they continued to bombard Buda and attempted to dig mines as well. The Turks made a few unsuccessful sally attempts. On October 13, Grand Vizier Hassan's army of 20–30,000 arrived, and the Nádasdy cavalry was dispatched to meet them. The arrival of Hasszán's main army significantly impeded the siege of Buda. Hassan was besieging Pest, while Russwurm was besieging Buda. On October 21, Hassan Pasha launched a major attack on Pest but was unable to achieve any results.

The Christians continued their siege of Buda, and on October 22, they launched a significant attack. The multiple waves of the assault have been fiercely repelled by the Ottomans, costing the Habsburgs 1,000–1,500 casualties. On October 25, there was another attack. Hannibal Kratz led the Germans in this attack on the Turkish ramparts, but the Hungarians provided insufficient support, resulting in the attack being repelled and significant losses for the Habsburgs.

After a fruitless 20-day siege, Hassan Pasha withdrew to the area around Tolna, where he assembled the 6,000 reinforcements he had ordered from Bosnia, realizing he could not capture Pest with such a small force. He then made a second attempt to capture Pest, this time with an overwhelming force. Upon leaving the camp in Pest, Hassan's army came upon a 2,000-strong infantry and cavalry army of Hungarians. This army was routed, with only half of them making it to the Habsburg camp in Buda.

Additionally, during the siege, the defenders launched successful sorties that have only been repulsed by suffering significant losses on the Habsburg side. Despite their lack of gunpowder and extreme fatigue, the Ottoman defenders in Buda persisted. The disease was wearing them down, and there was starvation among the besiegers. Winter arrived early, and on November 14, the Imperial troops abandoned Buda but retained Pest.
