= Siege of Buda (1603) =

- Part of the Long Turkish War
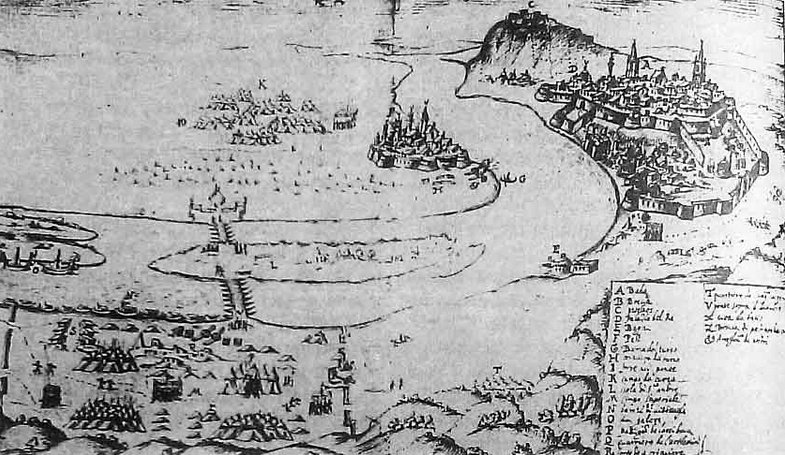
- Siege of Buda 1603
Date	28 September – 6 November 1603
Location	Buda, Hungary
Result	Ottoman victory

Belligerents
(Holy Roman Empire) Habsburg Empire; Kingdom of Hungary	Ottoman Empire

Commanders and leaders
(Holy Roman Empire) Christof von Russwurm (Holy Roman Empire) Siegfried von Kollonitsch; Ferenc Nádasdy	Lala Mehmed Pasha; Deli Hassan Pasha; Dervish Pasha †

Strength
32,000 men	24,000 men

Casualties and losses
Heavy	Heavy

The siege of Buda took place in 1603 during the Long Turkish War and was the third and last attempt to capture the town by the Habsburgs; however, despite initial success achieved by the Habsburgs, the Ottomans later thwarted the Habsburg attempt to capture the town.

== Background ==
After the siege of Buda in 1602, on November 2 of the previous year, Archduke Matthias promised to send another powerful besieging army under Buda in April 1603, ahead of the Turkish march. Still, this was only a promise. On the imperial side, internal issues and a severe cash shortage postponed the start of a new campaign. Despite inadequate food and artillery attacks from Buda, the imperial garrison of Pest, which had been taken in 1602, stood guard until the very end.

Due to internal unrest in Constantinople and Asia Minor, the Ottoman leadership did not plan another campaign in Hungary in 1603, instead focusing on waging war in Persia. Sultan Mehmed offered Emperor Rudolf a favorable peace deal by sending Count Giovanni Mario Isolano, the Székesfehérvár captain who had been taken prisoner in 1602. In exchange for the acknowledgement of Turkish ownership of Eger and Kanizsa, the sultan asked for the recognition of Pest, Esztergom, and Transylvania as belonging to the Hungarian monarch. Talks in the imperial camp at Komárom started in early July. Both sides prepared for war during the two months of fruitless negotiations.

== Prelude ==
Despite the disapproval of Archduke Matthias, Field Marshal Hermann von Russworm was reappointed with an army of 40,000 men. In order to arrange the march of the whole force to Buda Castle, Russwurm left Vienna for Esztergom on August 2, during the negotiations in Komárom. The Hungarian military in Végvár had not received pay in a long time, which made the recruiting even slower. It was impossible to set the precise objective of the imperial campaign because the War Council was unaware of the Turks' intentions.

The Christians in the northern corner of the Danube's Csepel Island had established formidable defenses by the time the Ottomans arrived at Hamzabég (Érd city). Pasha Lala Mehmed, a Serdar, commanded the Ottoman army. His camp lay close to Érd, and the Christians could not prevent his movement, sending a great deal of gunpowder, food, and troops to Buda Castle. The Port's mercenaries, along with the Sipahis and Janissaries, were limited in number due to the ongoing battles in Persia and Anatolia. Most likely, his army reached around 24,000 soldiers.

== Siege ==
=== Battle of Csepel Island ===
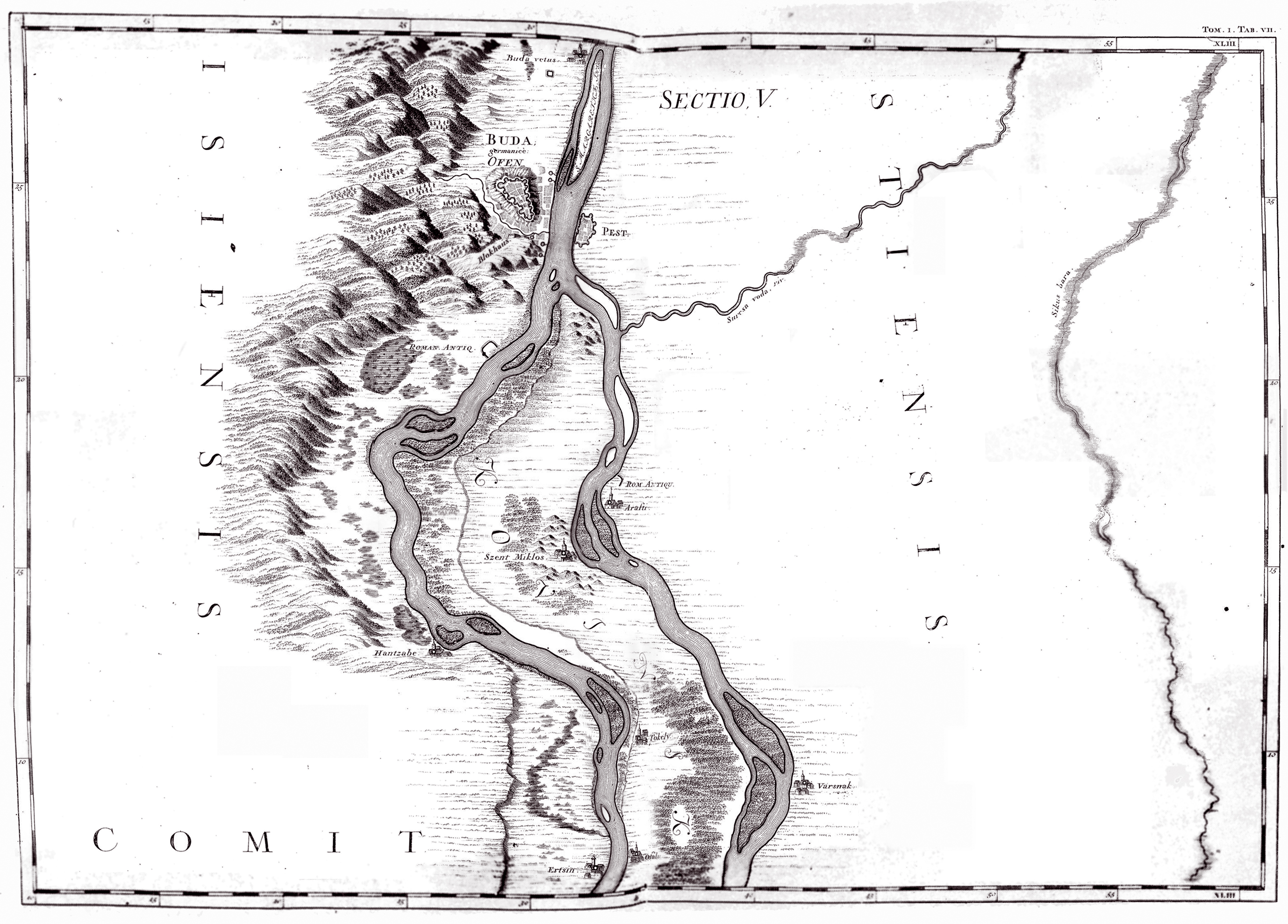
Drawing of the Buda and Pest and the northern part of Csepel Island, 1726

On the night of September 28, Lala Mohammed used barges and sloops to transport roughly 10,000 people to Csepel Island because the bridge over the Danube branch between Tököl and the island was still under construction. This group, led by Bosnian Pasha Dervis and Deli Hassan of Djelali, was made up of 3,000 janissaries, 7,000 horsemen, and a few guns. The remaining soldiers were meant to cross over to Csepel Island under their protection.

Field Marshal Russworm marched under cover of darkness with seven infantry regiments and his entire cavalry of 8,000 men to the island at two in the morning after learning of the enemy's crossing through his spies, and he had assigned the Italian regiment to protect the bridge and the side of the island from here. At eight in the morning on the 28th, in thick fog, he formed up his army in four lines of battle.

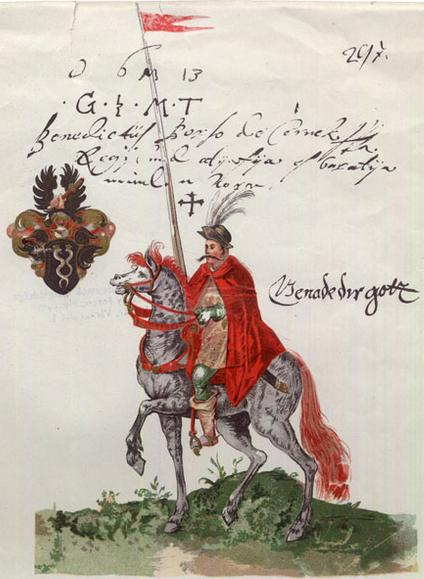
Hungarian Hussar, 1613

At eight in the morning, there was a clash between the two cavalries. The Sipahies of Pasha Deli Hassan were engaged in combat with the Hussars of Nádasdy Ferenc. Around midday, a group of 1,500 Ottomans with curved swords and slings came into contact with the Hussars of Nádasdy and the cavalrymen of Siegfried von Kollonitsch. The Turks, which had been steadily defending their position, were eventually overwhelmed by the Hussars thanks to the cavalry of Heinrich Matthias von Thurn and Kollonitsch, who soon arrived to support the Hungarians.

Then, in the middle of the day, Russwurm sent his musketeers to fire volleys of shots at the Turks. Around 2:30 p.m., the fighting peaked, and the Imperial soldiers were told not to take any prisoners. Driving the enemy into the river was the goal. The Ottoman cavalry was being ruthlessly decimated by the Kollonitch and Nádasdy cavalries.

The German soldiers arrived and ultimately decided the battle, despite the Ottomans' best efforts to defend themselves. Only 2,000 could escape by swimming and using boats to cross the river to avoid being surrounded. The Pasha Dervis, the Ottoman leader, along with the Pasha of Belgrade, also perished in the conflict. With 8,000 men lost, the Ottomans suffered greatly. Lala Mehmed and Deli Haszán, the two main commanders of the Turkish army, were blaming one another for the loss.

=== Battle of Háros Island ===
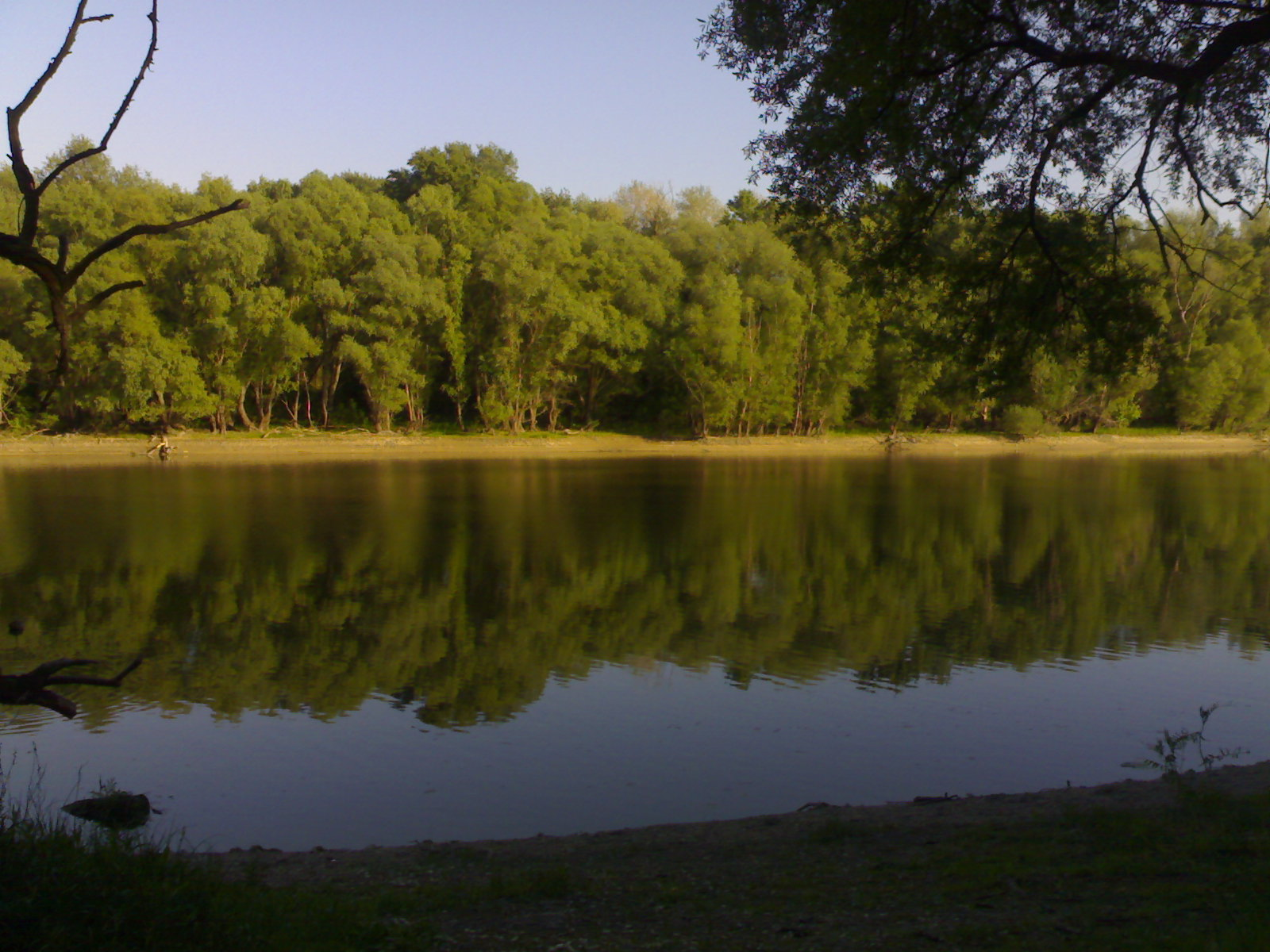
Haros Bay

Given the advanced fall weather, Russworm was now instructed by Emperor Rudolf to confine his efforts to the defense of Csepel Island and torment the Turks with minor skirmishes. However, Russworm made the decision to take over Háros Island and had a small fort built on the Buda side. They obeyed his orders, and on October 11 and 13, they crossed to the Buda coast. Fortunately, that night they managed to dig the rampart and establish a weak fortress, where Kollonics had about 600 hajduks under guard and ten flag spears driven into the ground near the rampart's edge.

On October 13, at noon, the Turks used their cavalry to charge the rampart and kill thirty of the Hungarians who were caught off guard inside. They also injured roughly a hundred others and took six sloops that were moored close to the fortress. Kollonics was only narrowly rescued. Russworm deployed musketeers and even set up forty cannons to protect the people inside the ramparts, but he was unable to call in the firemen because they were drunk in the camp. The artillery commander received a rebuke from the marshal for this, and he even loaded and fired some cannons himself. However, it was not very helpful, as the rampart was taken by the Turks in a two-hour battle. Many were killed during this attack.

=== Battle of Tököli island ===
Russwurm ordered a counterattack. On the night of October 20, a fleet was set out to disperse the Turkish fleet that was fighting in the small Tököli Island on several ships loaded with hajduks and muskets. The fleet was covered by 300 German musketeers on the coast of Csepel. However, upon reaching Tököli Island, the superiority of the Turks ships became obvious. Colonels Nádasdy and Kollonich, the commanders of the Hungarians, asked Russwurm for 50 Imperial Landsknechts as reinforcements, but the field marshal replied that he did not want to risk the lives of German infantrymen. For this reason, the Hungarians refused to stay ashore on the island. The operation was unsuccessful, and despite some skirmishes, they were able to withdraw safely.

== Aftermath ==
With his undisciplined army of only 32,000 men, which was dwindling daily, he could not attempt to besiege the castle. After this, Russwurm withdrew with his entire army from Buda on November 6. The Imperials had no more opportunity to besiege Buda as the weather grew colder and their food supply was running low. Buda was under a strong garrison at the same time.

Russwurm wanted to demonstrate his success after the defeat at Buda, so he turned his attention to the nearby weak castle of Hatvan. The defenders of the castle surrendered after a three-day bombardment during the siege, which lasted from November 16 to 19. After leaving 400 men in its garrison, Russwurm led his army to his wintering area. The city of Hatvan submitted to Christian forces on November 19, 1603, but there was no compensation for the defeat at Buda.
