= Hungarian Revolution =

Hungarian Revolution most often refers to:

- Hungarian Revolution of 1848
- Revolutions and interventions in Hungary (1918–1920), the Communist revolution to establish the Hungarian Soviet Republic
- Hungarian Revolution of 1956

Hungarian Revolution can also refer to:

- Rákóczi's War of Independence
- Aster Revolution
- End of communism in Hungary
- Bocskai uprising
