= Siege of Székesfehérvár =

1601 Ottoman defeat in Hungary

- Part of the Long Turkish War; Ottoman–Habsburg wars
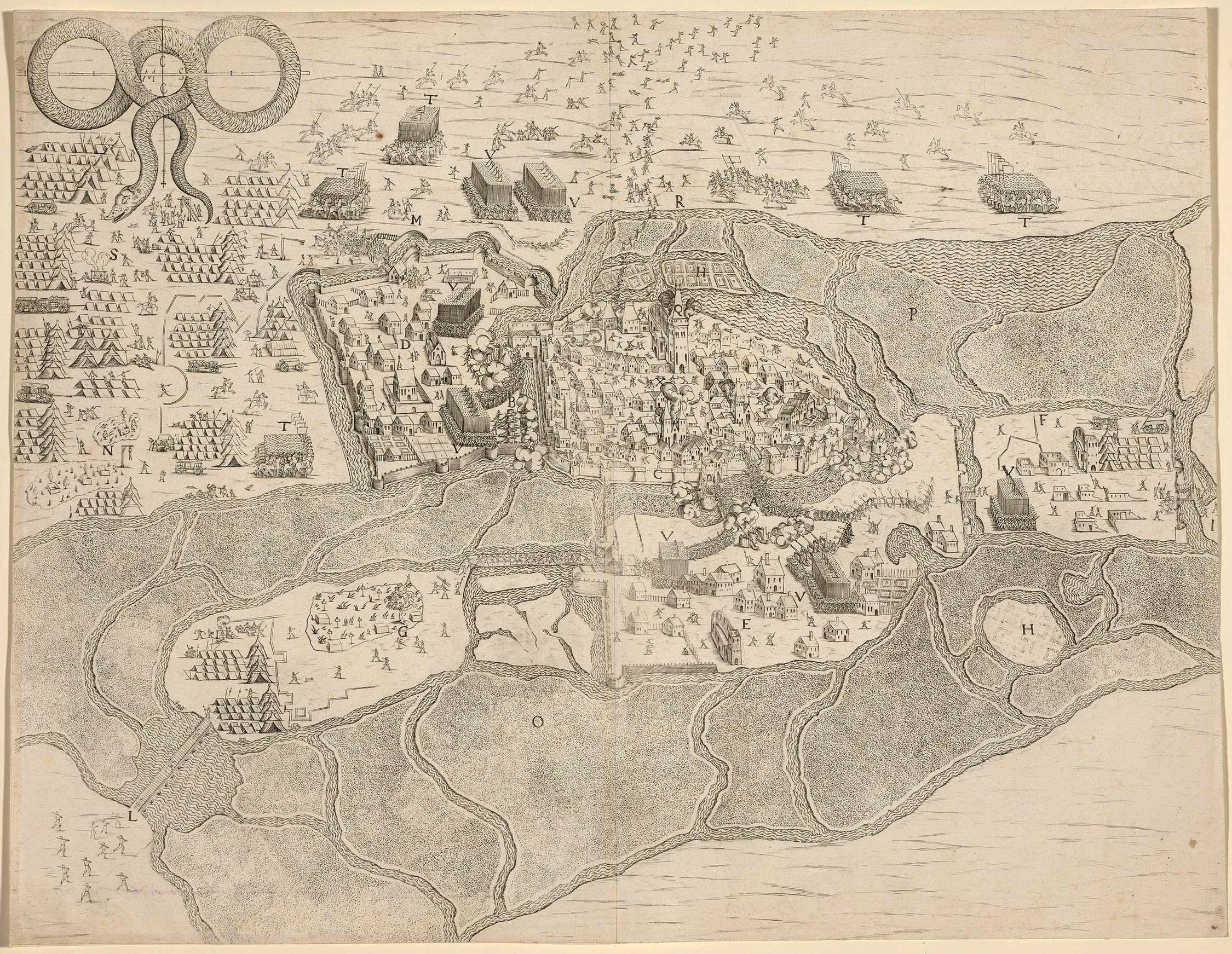
- Siege of Székesfehérvár
Date	4–20 September 1601
Location	Székesfehérvár, Ottoman Empire present-day Hungary 47°11′23″N 18°24′37″E
Result	Holy Roman Empire victory

Belligerents
Ottoman Empire	Holy Roman Empire

Commanders and leaders
Yemişçi Hasan Pasha	Duke of Mercœur; (Holy Roman Empire) General Ruswurm

Strength
Unknown	18,000

Casualties and losses
Unknown	1,000

The siege of Székesfehérvár also known as the siege of Stuhlweissenburg (French: Prise d'Albe-Royale, German: Belagerung von Stuhlweißenburg, Turkish: İstolni Belgrad) began on 4 September 1601 when an Imperial force sent by Holy Roman emperor Rudolf II, under the command of Frenchman Philippe Emmanuel de Lorraine, duc de Mercoeur, besieged the Hungarian fortress of Székesfehérvár occupied by the Ottomans since 1543. The battle resulted in a victory for the Imperial force.

== Background ==
In 1600 Frenchman from the Duchy of Lorraine, Philippe-Emmanuel, duke de Mercoeur, (Note: Sometimes mentioned as Duke Mercury in historical records.) who had volunteered to serve with the army of the Holy Roman against the Turks in Hungary, was called by Rudolf II to become Commander-in-chief of the Imperial troops. In March 1601 the Ottoman Sultan sent an official complaint to King Henry IV of France to protest about the presence of a Frenchman in command of the Habsburg army.

In September 1601 an army under Mercoeur and Habsburg commander Count Adolf von Schwarzenberg was sent by Rudolf II to lay siege to Stuhlweißenburg (as Székesfehérvár was known in German).

== Siege ==
A deserter told the duke that the city could be reached from the back via a ford where the shallow part allowed crossing by foot. The duke immediately sent General Hermann Ruswurm with 1,000 men to find the passage. Later that day, with great difficulties progressing through the mud, Russwurm found the ford and sent a signal to the duke. Mercoeur promptly launched an attack "with great noise" bringing the bulk of the Ottoman defenders towards the front of the fortress while Russwurm, according to the established plan, scaled the walls with his men and seized the city.

Lawrence of Brindisi, a Catholic priest and a member of the Order of Friars Minor Capuchin, who served as the imperial chaplain for the army of Rudolph II, famously led the army during the battle for Székesfehérvár armed only with a crucifix. On 20 September the besieged surrendered after blowing up the church and the palace. After the taking of the fortress, the duke of Mercœur left German Colonel Staremberg and his regiment commanding the town.

== Aftermath ==
On 9 October less than three weeks later, Hasan Pasha and a large Ottoman army returned in an attempt to retake Székesfehérvár. A Christian army under archduke Matthias defeated them at the Battle of Stuhlweissenburg.

Mercoeur died of a fever on his way back to France. Sokolluzade Lala Mehmed Paşa recaptured Székesfehérvár for the Ottoman Empire the following year in August 1602.
