= Thirteen Years' War =

Thirteen Years' War may refer to:

- the Thirteen Years' War (1454–1466) between the Prussian Confederation and Poland versus the Teutonic Order state
- the Long Turkish War (1593–1606) between the Habsburg Monarchy and the Ottoman Empire
- the Russo-Polish War (1654–1667) between Russia, the Cossacks and the Polish–Lithuanian Commonwealth

== See also ==
- Fifteen Years War (disambiguation)
