= Fifteen Years War =

Fifteen Years War may refer to:

- Long Turkish War, 1591–1606 war between the Habsburg Monarchy and the Ottoman Empire
- Pacific War, conflicts involving Japan from the Mukden Incident in Manchuria in 1931 through the end of World War II in 1945

== See also ==
- Mukden Incident, a false flag event staged by Japanese military personnel in Manchuria in 1931
- Second Sino-Japanese War, conflict primarily between the Republic of China and the Empire of Japan in 1937–1945
- First Peloponnesian War, 460–445 BC fighting between Sparta and Athens, along with allies on both sides
- Thirteen Years' War (disambiguation)
