= Lawrence of Brindisi =

Catholic priest and theologian

Saint Lawrence of Brindisi OFM Cap
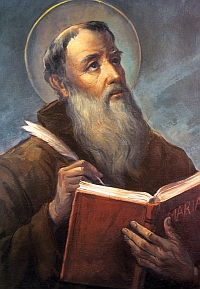

Doctor of the Church
- Born: July 22, 1559; Brindisi, Kingdom of Naples
- Died: 22 July 1619 (aged 60); Lisbon, Kingdom of Portugal
- Venerated in: Catholic Church
- Beatified: 1 June 1783, Saint Peter's Basilica, Papal States by Pope Pius VI
- Canonized: 8 December 1881, Saint Peter's Basilica, Kingdom of Italy by Pope Leo XIII
- Major shrine: Villafranca del Bierzo
- Feast: 21 July
- Attributes: Leading soldiers against the Turks; With the Infant Jesus
- Patronage: Brindisi

Lawrence of Brindisi (22 July 1559 – 22 July 1619), born Giulio Cesare Russo, was an Italian Catholic priest, theologian and member of the Order of Friars Minor Capuchin. An accomplished linguist, in addition to his native Italian, Lawrence could read and speak Latin, Hebrew, Greek, German, Czech, Spanish, and French fluently. Lawrence was ordained a priest at the age of 23. Lawrence was beatified on 1 June 1783 and canonized as a saint on 8 December 1881.

== Biography ==
Giulio Cesare Russo was born in Brindisi, Kingdom of Naples, to a family of Venetian merchants. The Conventuals of Brindisi were entrusted with his education. Showing an early gift for oratory, he was always the one chosen to address, in accordance with the Italian custom, a short sermon to his compatriots on the Infant Jesus during the Christmas festivities. He was twelve when his father died, and continued his education at Saint Mark's College in Venice under the supervision of one of his uncles.

Cesare joined the Capuchins in Verona as Brother Lawrence. He received further instruction from the University of Padua. An accomplished linguist, in addition to his native Italian, Lawrence could read and speak Latin, Hebrew, Greek, German, Bohemian, Spanish, and French fluently. While still a deacon he preached the Lenten sermons in Venice. Lawrence was ordained a priest at the age of 23.

At the age of thirty-one, Lawrence was elected superior of the Capuchin Franciscan province of Tuscany. In 1596 he was appointed definitor general in Rome for the Capuchins. Pope Clement VIII assigned him the task of preaching to the Jews in the city. His knowledge of the Hebrew language was of great help in this regard. Beginning in 1599, Lawrence established Capuchin monasteries in modern Germany and Austria, furthering the Counter-Reformation and bringing many Protestants back to the Catholic faith. He also founded friaries in Vienna, Prague, and Graz.

It was on the occasion of the foundation of the convent of Prague in 1601 that he was named the imperial chaplain for the army of Rudolph II, Holy Roman Emperor, and successfully recruited Philippe Emmanuel, Duke of Mercœur, to help fight against the Ottoman Turks. He then led the army during the siege of Székesfehérvár in Hungary from the Ottoman Empire, armed only with a crucifix.

In 1602, he was elected vicar general of the Capuchin friars, at that time the highest office in the Order. He was elected again in 1605, but refused the office. Until his death, he was the best adviser of his successors. He entered the service of the Holy See, becoming papal nuncio to Bavaria. After serving as nuncio to Spain, he retired to a monastery in 1618. He was recalled as a special envoy to the King of Spain regarding the actions of the Viceroy of Naples in 1619, and after finishing his mission, died on his 60th birthday in Lisbon.

He was entombed at the Poor Clares' Convento de la Anunciada (Convent of the Annunciation) in Villafranca del Bierzo, Spain.

== Favourite blessing ==
Nos cum prole pia
benedicat Virgo Maria.

Translation:

Mary, with Her loving Son,
bless us each and every one.

== Veneration ==
He was beatified in 1783 by Pope Pius VI and was canonized in 1881 by Pope Leo XIII. In 1959 Pope John XXIII declared him Doctor of the Church with the title "Apostolic Doctor".

== Works ==
St. Lawrence of Brindisi Complete Works were published in 15 volumes, in a critical edition, between 1926 and 1956. They comprise:

- Mariale
- Lutheranismi hypotyposis
- Explanatio in Genesim
- Quadragesimale primum
- Quadragesimale secundum
- Quadragesimale tertium
- Quadragesimale quartum
- Adventus
- Dominicalia
- Sanctorale
- Sermones de tempore

His original manuscripts comprise 13 volumes in parchment and are located at the Archivio dei Cappuccini di Mestre.

== See also ==
- St. Lawrence Seminary High School
- Saint Lawrence of Brindisi, patron saint archive
