= Siege of Buda (1598) =

- Part of the Long Turkish War
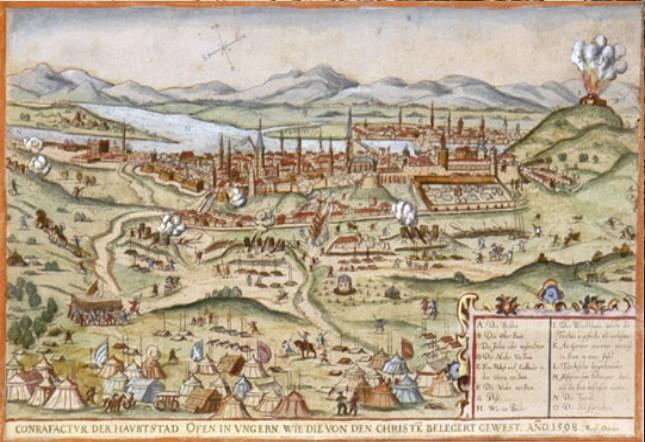
- Siege of Buda 1598
Date	5 October – 2 November 1598
Location	Buda, Hungary
Result	Ottoman victory

Belligerents
(Holy Roman Empire) Habsburg Empire; Kingdom of Hungary; Cossacks	Ottoman Empire

Commanders and leaders
(Holy Roman Empire) Archduke Matthias (Holy Roman Empire) Adolf von Schwarzenberg; Pálffy Miklós; Ferenc Nádasdy	Mihalijli Ahmed Pasha

Strength
37,000 men: 6,000 Hungarians; 1,000 Cossacks; 5,000 Walloons and French; 25,000 Germans; 140 cannons	7,000 men: 1,000 Janissaries

Casualties and losses
5,000–6,000 killed	Unknown

The siege of Buda took place in 1598 during the Long Turkish War and was the first of three attempts to capture the town by the Habsburgs; however, it ended in failure.

== Prelude ==
The troops gathered in the Vác camp when the court finally granted permission to begin the operations intended to capture Buda, which was around the middle of September. Once more, Archduke Matthias was named commander-in-chief of the army; however, Schwarzenberg was designated as deputy commander-in-chief for the time being, as he would only step down later. Following the construction of the two Danube bridges at Vác, Miklós Pálffy led 6,000 Hungarian Hussars, followed by 1,000 Cossacks of Ferenc Nádasdy. After them came 5,000 Walloons and French mercenaries, and finally a large German army of 25,000 led by Schwarzenberg. The Habsburgs had 140 cannons as well.

The Ottomans had a garrison of 7,000 men, including 1,000 Janissaries, led by Mihalijli Ahmed Pasha.

== Siege ==
The Habsburg army arrived in Buda on October 3 and began the siege on October 5. On October 6, they attacked the lower suburb, and although they took few prisoners, they were routed due to the Ottomans' heavy fire. This attack was repeated on October 8 by a strong mixed detachment composed of all nationalities, but in the one-hour battle, they were repelled. On October 9, the archduke arrived in Buda to direct the siege.

The next day at 3:00 p.m., an attack was launched against the upper town with 6,000 men from three sides, which was repulsed; however, Pálffy managed to rally his men and chase the Ottomans in a battle in which the Turks lost 1,500 men, but the attackers lost several hundred of their men. At the same time, another assault was launched against the Jewish quarter; however, the Ottomans with the Jewish inhabitants were able to repel the attack.

On October 11, the 300 Ottoman garrisons occupying the blockhouse on Gellért Hill retreated to the city after setting fire to the fort. Two days later, the Habsburgs occupied the position and began bombarding the town from a hill. On October 14, Matthias demanded the garrison surrender; however, they refused, and three days later, the weather turned cold and the rains made the task of the besiegers more difficult.

After the non-stop rain filled all the trenches with water and made it very difficult to continue the siege and mine work, and since the season was already unsuitable, Matthias decided to end the siege on October 27. The disarmament of the cannons took a few days, and the retreat could only begin on November 2, during which the Ottomans attempted a sally, but the archduke was able to lead his men back to Esztergom.
