= Bocskai uprising =

Rebellion against the Holy Roman Empire

Bocskai uprising Bocskai's War of Independence
- Part of the Long Turkish War and the European wars of religion
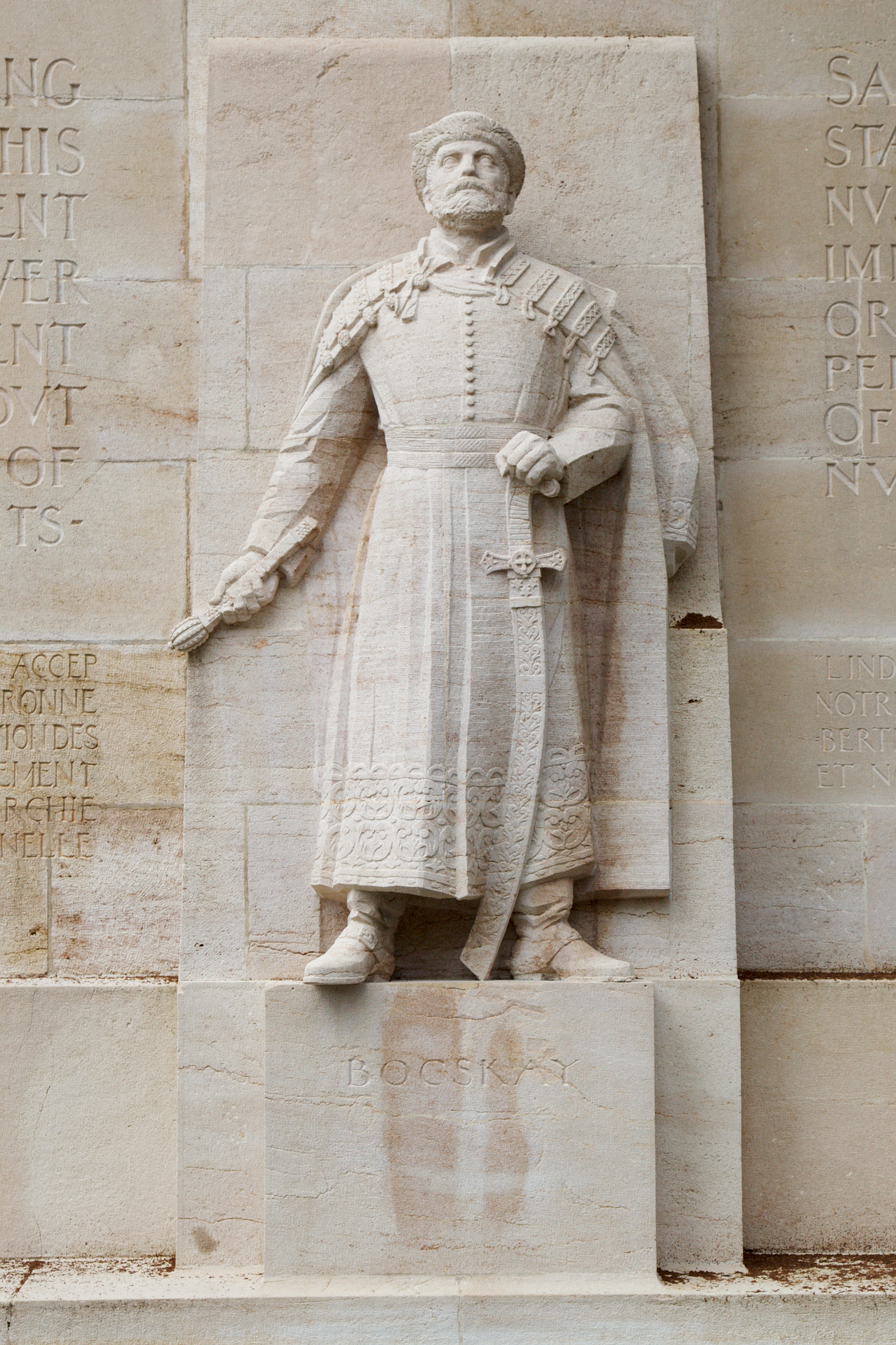
- Bocskai's statue on the Reformation Wall in Geneva
Date	28 September 1604 – 23 June 1606 (1 year, 8 months, 3 weeks and 5 days)
Location	Transylvania
Result	Hungarian victory, Treaty of Vienna (1606)

Belligerents
Holy Roman Empire: Crown of Bohemia; Austria; Royalists; Kingdom of Croatia; Spanish Empire; Zaporozhian Sich; Serbs; Walloon, Italian, Romanian, German mercenaries	Hajduk rebels of Stephen Bocskai and Hungarian supporters and minorities (mostly Slovaks and Rusyns); Transylvania; Moldavia; Ottoman Empire; Crimean Khanate

Commanders and leaders
(Holy Roman Empire) Rudolf II, Holy Roman Emperor (Holy Roman Empire) Giorgio Basta (Holy Roman Empire) Giovanni Barbiano di Belgiojoso	Stephen Bocskai; Balázs Németi †; Ferenc Rhédey (Ottoman Empire) Sokolluzade Lala Mehmed Pasha

Strength
60,000	40,000

The Bocskai uprising, known in Hungary as Bocskai's War of Independence (Hungarian: Bocskai szabadságharc, Bocskai-felkelés) was a revolt which took place in Hungary, Transylvania and modern Slovakia during the Long Turkish War (between 1604 and 1606) against Emperor Rudolf II. The rebel leader was Stephen Bocskai, a Protestant Hungarian nobleman. The Ottoman wars had burdened the Kingdom of Hungary for years, causing famine and disease, and the armies of the Christian states had been weakened by losses to Ottoman and Tatar forces.

Rudolf II persecuted the Protestants, and the wealthy Hungarian noblemen were falsely accused of treason. Bocskai organized the revolt and persuaded the Hungarian military Hajduks to join, defeating the imperial forces and foreign mercenaries. The Hungarian nobility, soldiers and peasants (including the minorities) joined Bocskai's Hajduk army. Although he was supported by the Ottoman Empire, the Crimean Khanate, Moldavia, Transylvania, he prevented an Ottoman siege of Vienna. Bocskai was declared Prince of Transylvania and Hungary, but recognized that total Hungarian independence was impossible against the Habsburg monarchy and the Ottoman Empire. He blazed a political trail for his supporters: the preservation of an independent Transylvania, a potential base for the unification of Hungary. Based on the terms of the Treaty of Vienna in 1606, all constitutional and religious rights and privileges were granted to the Hungarians in both the Principality of Transylvania and Royal Hungary. The treaty also recognized Bocskai as the Prince of Transylvania and guaranteed the right of Transylvanians to elect their own independent princes in the future.

== Background ==
Archduke Ferdinand I of Austria, who became Holy Roman Emperor in 1556, had centralized the military and finances of the Habsburg Empire. The Kingdom of Hungary (which had lost territory) was governed by the Hofkriegsrat, the Hofkammer, the Hofkanzlei and the Secret Council, based in Vienna. The border fortress system was imported from Vienna during the 16th century. Pozsony and Szepes (Spiš) were governed from Vienna, and the Court Chamber (Hofkammer) had no Hungarian members.

Complaints in the national parliaments included the behavior of foreign officials and mercenaries and the fact that the Habsburgs spent little time in Hungary. Rudolf moved his residence from Vienna to Prague in 1583; it was safer from the Ottomans, but further from Hungary. After the 1562 death of Palatine Tamás Nádasdy, his position remained vacant until 1608.

== Prelude ==
In 1591, the Long Turkish War began. The Habsburg Monarchy (Austria, Bohemia, Hungary, Croatia, and Moravia) joined the Transylvanian and Ottoman vassal states of Moldavia and Wallachia. Several European states also sent troops to Hungary. The Papal State primarily recruited foreign Walloon and Italian mercenaries for the war. The Habsburg and Spanish kings also employed Walloon mercenaries in addition to German, Italian and Spanish soldiers.

The Christian forces suppressed the Ottomans early in the war until the Battle of Keresztes (1596), when they were defeated. The war then dragged on, wearing out Hungary, Transylvania, and Croatia. The Habsburgs spent their military budget, and the unpaid mercenaries (particularly the Walloons) ventured into Hungary and Transylvania. The Tatar auxiliary of the Ottoman army wrought havoc in Hungary, and several thousand men died of hunger and disease.

=== The Long Turkish War's effects on Transylvanian domestic policy ===
With minor clashes escalating along the border, the Long Turkish War began as early as 1591. More serious combat took place in 1593, when Sultan Murad III nullified the 1568 Treaty of Adrianople and declared war on the Habsburgs. Although the sultan called on Zsigmond Báthory to join the Ottoman army, he decided to join the anti-Ottoman league on the advice of his uncle Stephen Bocskai (captain of Várad, present-day Oradea) and the Jesuit priest Alonso Carrillo. Most of the Transylvanian Assembly feared that Turkish troops would loot Transylvania before the Christian army arrived, however, and the prince's plan was not adopted. Zsigmond Báthory resigned from the principality in the summer of 1594 in favor of his cousin, Boldizsár Báthory, who represented the Turks.

Bocskai began working behind the scenes to reverse this. After visiting the prince's trustees, he asked for soldiers. The Assembly of Kolozsvár passed a resolution dissolving the Turkish alliance and supporting the emperor. On orders from Sigismund, the opposition lords, the prince (Boldizsár Báthory), his cousin, chancellor Farkas Kovacsóczy, councilor Sándor Kendy (father-in-law of Boldizsár Báthory and Farkas Kovacsóczy), Ferenc Kendy (brother of Sándor János Kendy), Gábor Kendy Gergely and László Szalánczy from Branyicska were captured and executed. Others were imprisoned because prince Sigismund Bathory had pardoned János Gerendi, Albert Lónyai, György Szalánczi and Boldizsár Szilvásy.

The war was indecisive, and the Kingdom of Hungary was destroyed by German and Walloon mercenaries. Transylvania suffered the most from the war, which became a long-term civil war as a result of Zsigmond (Sigismund) Báthory's repeated resignations and returns. Rudolf appointed Michael the Brave Voivode of Transylvania; Michael overthrew the principality, briefly uniting Transylvania, Wallachia and Moldavia under one single ruler. Rudolf allowed him to be assassinated, replacing him with general Giorgio Basta.

=== The financial problems of the Habsburg Empire ===
At the turn of the 17th century, the Long Turkish War led to the empire accumulating millions of Rhine forints in annual debt. In some years of the 15-year war, expenditures were five million forints; this created annual budget deficits of 800,000 to 1.5 million forints, which could only be resolved with credit. Annual revenue during the 1570s was 2–2.5 million Rhine forints, and the debt was sometimes 1,500 percent of that. Rudolf, his advisors and nobility tried to alleviate the fiscal problems by confiscating the property of the Hungarian aristocracy. Infringement (high treason) and betrayal lawsuits were brought against the wealthiest Hungarian barons and families, usually with the loss of property and goods. The idea originated with local Catholic priests, whose targets were Protestant. Legal proceedings were even brought against soldiers in the Long Turkish War: Sigismund Rákóczi, Tamás Nádasdy, Mihály Telekessy, and the Alaghy, Balassa, Drugeth and Kállay families from Homonna. The first verdict was handed down in March 1603 in the case of Istvan Illésházy, whose castles and estates were confiscated; however, he escaped to Poland.

=== Religion conflict ===
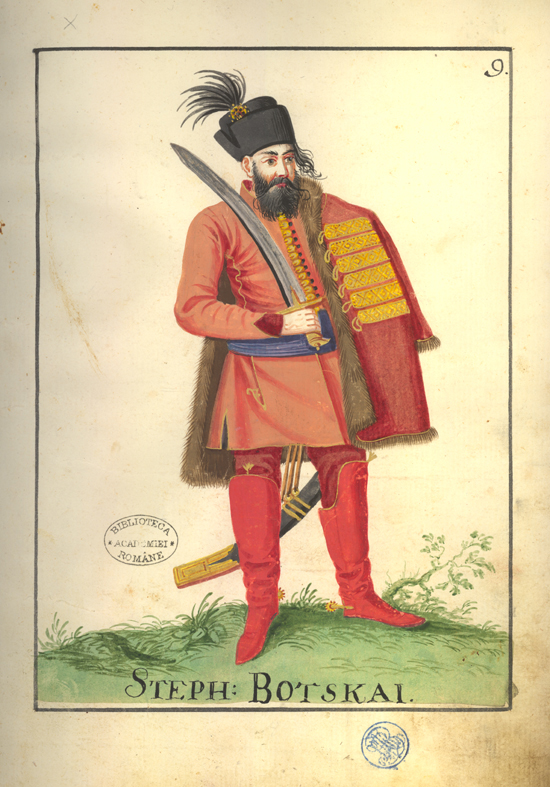
Stephen Bocskai

Unlike Emperor Maximilian I, who was tolerant of Protestants, Rudolf II supported the enforced conversion of Protestants to the Catholic faith. The Counter-Reformation began in the Habsburg Austrian and Styrian provinces (where Lutheranism was dominant) and Hungary (where Calvinism prevailed, although the cities of Upper Hungary were Lutheran). During the Long Turkish War, Rudolf turned Protestant churches over to Catholics.

Following the murder of Michael, Basta became military commander of Transylvania, but his cruelty led to public discontent. Under his leadership, iniquities and murders multiplied throughout Transylvania. During this brief period, Basta tried to uproot Protestantism. Following Papal and Imperial policy, Calvinist Hungarians and Székelys, Orthodox Wallachians and Serbs, and Lutheran Saxons were subject to any kind of abuse. Following years of warfare and his ruthless regime, famine and plague appeared in Transylvania. At that time Rudolf II decided to recall him from command, leading to Basta's departure from Transylvania and put him in charge to fight against the Ottomans of West Hungary(1604).

=== Gabriel Bethlen's letter ===
Gabriel Bethlen wrote to ask Stephen Bocskai to lead them against the illegitimate king. On behalf of those who fled to Turkish territory, Bethlen encouraged Bocskai to spearhead an anti-Habsburg uprising with the prospect of a Turkish alliance. Bocskai had a key position when he supported his nephew Sigismund Báthory and was a battle-hardened leader. Their correspondence was intercepted by Giovan Giacomo Barbiano di Belgioioso, captain of Kassa. Bocskai had to hire former Hajduks to defend himself from an imperial attempt to prevent his arrest for treason and save his property from consfication.

== Uprising ==
=== Beginning ===
Some of Bocskai's men betrayed him about Turkish relations. Cyprian Concini (vice-captain of Varad) made a deal with him; Concini reported it to Giovan Giacomo Barbiano di Belgioioso, who ordered Bocskai to his camp in Rakamaz. The traitors (Szentjobb captain Ferenc Székely, judge Dáz Lázár Posgai, and István Fráter) handed Szentjobb to Concini. The following day, Concini attacked Bocskai's fortress in Nagykereki. Bocskai had recruited 300 Hajduks; the Hajduks of Kölesér and the castle soldiers under the command of Örvéndy formed the core of his army, and many others served under Belgioioso.

Bocskai resisted, retreating two days later with considerable losses before the emperor's three-column army. Several Hajduk captains in Belgioioso's army (Balázs Lippai, Ferenc Ibrányi, Mihály Dengeleghy, Mátyás Szénássy, and Balázs Németi) were willing to change sides. One of the three imperial columns, led by Colonel Pezzen, joined Belgioioso's main army. The decisive battle of the first phase of the campaign took place at night in the woods between Álmosd and Diószeg. Bocskai encountered Pezzen's loose, stretched column of infantry, cavalry and cannons.

Bocskai's men surrounded Varad, but had few supplies. Belgioioso retreated towards Tokaj, and many of his soldiers had deserted.

=== Intervention of Giorgio Basta ===
Giorgio Basta, whose armies had successfully fought the Ottomans, marched from Esztergom against Bocskai's insurgents. Balázs Németi attacked him with his soldiers and peasant insurgents at Osgyán, but had been captured and executed by Basta.

After his victory in Osgyán, Basta marched to Edelény and the valley near Ládbesenyő; he was surrounded by Bocskai's armies and Turkish auxiliary troops. Although Basta burned his supplies, but two days later he found a weak link in the direction of Kassa. Kassa, defended by Miklós Segnyei's Hajduks, repelled him. Basta then marched to Eperjes, where he remained until April 1605.

=== Spreading across Hungary ===
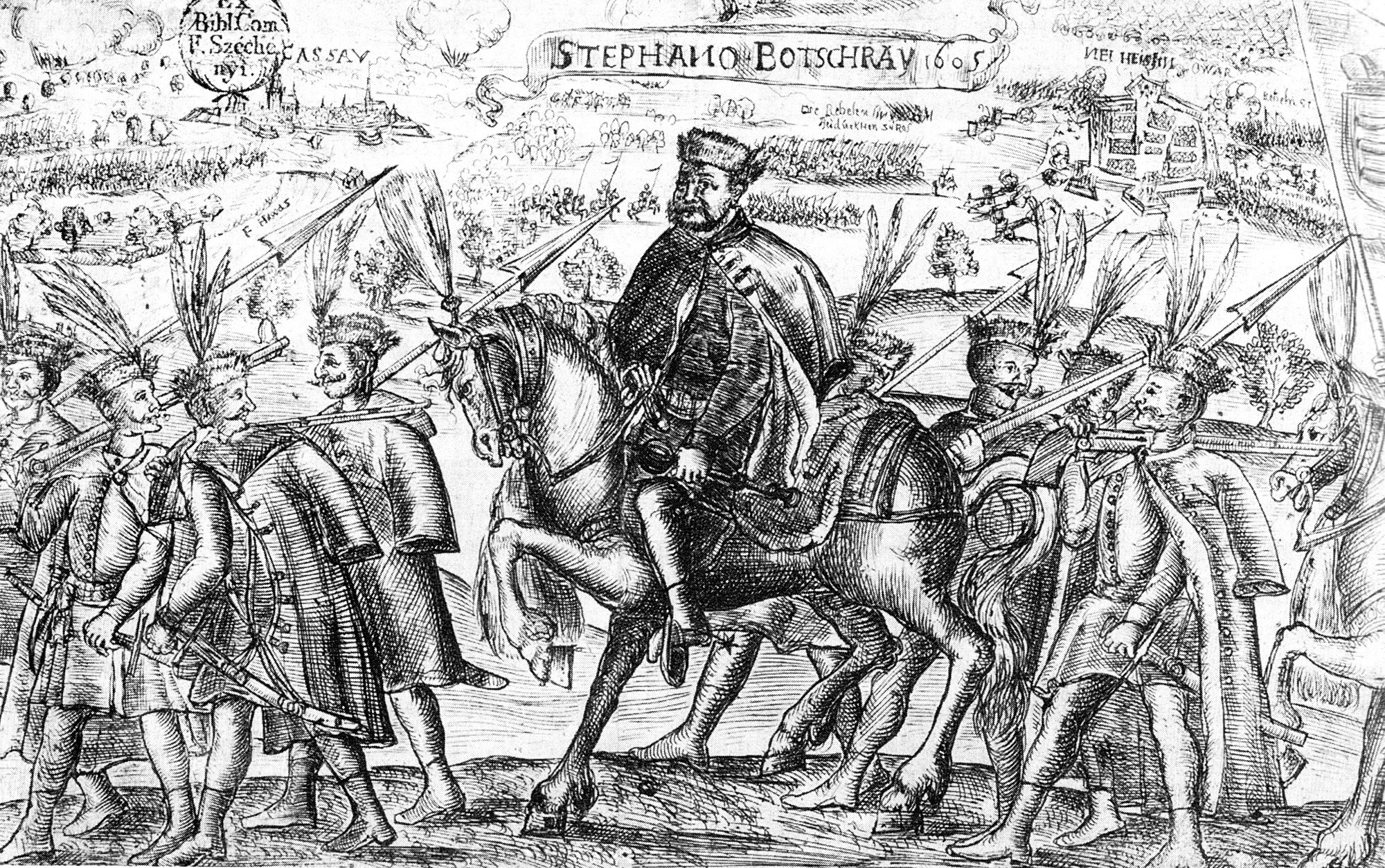
Stephen Bocskai and his hajduk warriors

Bocskai realized that he could not win in battle, but he could cut his opponent's supply lines. Headquartered in Kassa, he carefully organized his army, dissolved opposition from the Hajduks, serfs and nobility, and formulated plans for the operation with Ferenc Rhédey. Balazs Lippai killed many mercenaries and civilians, and Bocskai had him assassinated in January 1605.

Basta broke out of Eperjes once before April 1605, but found no opposition; he strengthened Tokaj (which remained loyal to the emperor) with food and ammunition, before retreating back to Eperjes. In early spring, he realized that he could not regain Hungary and retreated to Pozsony.

In May 1605, Gergely Némethy's Hajduks began to conquer the Transdanubian castles. They soon reached the Sopron–Kőszeg defensive line and, reinforced by Turkish auxiliaries, ventured into Austria. Némethy unsuccessfully tried to enlist Styrian and Croatian troops. The region had a tradition of anti-Turkish sentiment due to the devastation brought by Akinji raids, and Némethy was unable to conquer the western cities protecting Vienna. Although imperial troops in Western Transdanubia counterattacked in September, Némethy held back a significant force.

The emperor's armies counterattacked in the districts of Komárom, Érsekújvár and Esztergom, and Mátyás Somogyi transferred his three thousand western-Hungarian troops to the imperial side. Most of the country's fortresses, however, were captured by the insurgents.

A battle for Transylvania began in October; Szatmar was besieged, falling to the insurgents at the end of January after the imperial supply line was cut. László Gyulaffy was Bocskai's first governor of the region until his death the following July. On 21 February 1605, Bocskai was elected Prince of Transylvania by the Szekelys and the county nobility in Nyárádszereda.The Serbian and Romanian soldiers in the imperial pay were defeated by the Szekelys near Solymos back in May. Segesvár was already under the Hasburgs, which surrendered in September The Estates occupied Transylvania without a major battle.

In April, the Assembly of Szerencs appointed Bocskai as Prince of Hungary. He refused to negotiate with Rudolf's peace envoys at first, finally agreeing to do so that year.

== Treaties ==
The Treaty of Vienna was signed on 23 June 1606 by Emperor Rudolf II and Prince Bocskay. It ensured Hungarian rights and gave the counties of Szatmár, Bereg and Ugocsa to Transylvania for the life of its descendants. The most important point of the peace is that it recognized the independent Principality of Transylvania, which was ruled primarily by Hungarian princes.

On 24 September, Rudolf issued a proclamation that he would hand over Ugocsa, Bereg, Szatmár and Szabolcs counties, Tokaj castle, and the market towns of Tarcal, Bodrogkeresztúr and Olaszliszka to Bocskai.

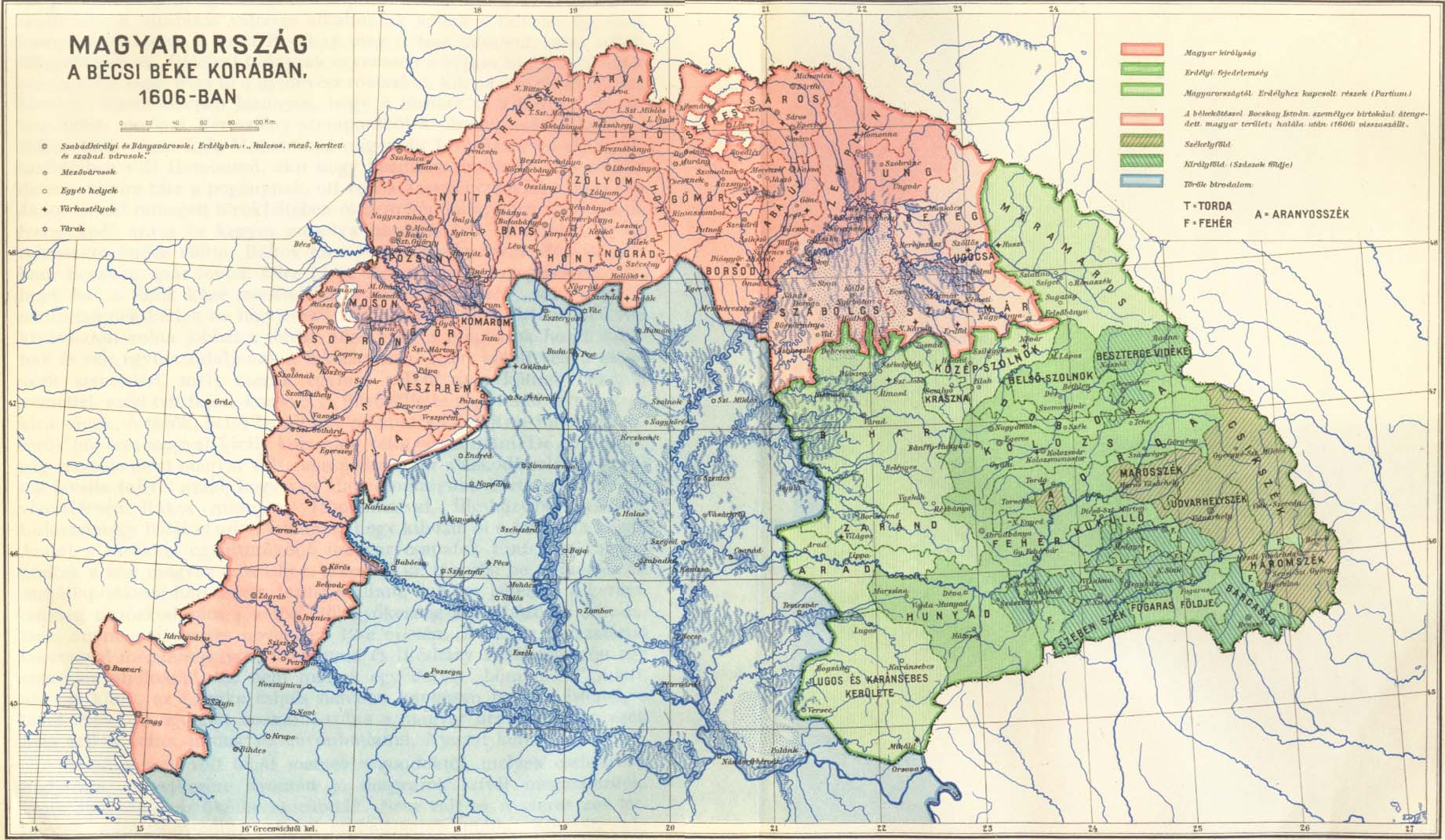
Royal Hungary, the Principality of Transylvania and Ottoman eyalets in 1606

The Peace of Zsitvatorok, signed on november that year, finally ended the 13-year Long Turkish War.

== Timeline ==
- 1604
  - Colonel Concini attacked Kereki
  - 14–15 October: Battle of Álmosd
  - 15 October: Debrecen conquered by Bocskai
  - Late October: Battle of Tokaj against Belgioioso
  - 31 October: Lippai-Nemeti manifesto
  - 11 November: Bocskai entered to Kassa(today Kosice, Slovakia)
  - 14 November: Battle of Ostyan: Balazs Nemeti was captured and executed by Basta
  - End of November: Battle of Edelény
  - December: Kassa resisted against Basta, who marched to Eperjes; Rhedey's army looted West-Felvidék(today West Slovakia) and endangered Basta's supply lines.
  - 1 December: Bocskai issued a manifesto in Göncz requested the nobility to join him.
  - End of December: Manifesto of Balazs Lippai
- 1605
  - January: Balazs Lippai assassinated by Bocskai; Szatmar conquered by Bocskai's troops.
  - 21 February: Bocskai was elected Prince of Transylvania.
  - April: Basta retreated from Eperjes to Pozsony(today Bratislava).
  - 17 April: Manifesto from the Estates who joined Bocskai. Bocskai elected Prince of Hungary in Szerencs; Tachtamis, khan of Crimea, is ordered by the Ottomans to assist him.
  - May: Bocskai's troops reach Transdanubia (Dunántúl).
  - September: Rudolf's troops counterattack in Western Hungary,
  - Autumn: Assembly in Korpona
  - 11 November: Bocskai and Grand Vizier Lalla Mehmed meet in Pest County.
  - 12 December: Bocskai settled the Hajduks and makes them nobles.
- 1606
  - 23 June: Treaty of Vienna
  - 17 December: Bocskai dictated his Will.
  - 29 December: Bocskai died under suspicious circumstances; his men blamed (and killed) Mihály Káthay.

== See also ==
- List of revolutions and rebellions
- List of rebellions in the Habsburg monarchy
- Rákóczi's War of Independence

== Sources ==
- Bánlaki, József: A magyar nemzet hadtörtenelme. I–XXII. Volume, Budapest, 1928–1942 Grill Károly Könyvkiadó[Volume XV].
  https://mek.oszk.hu/09400/09477/html/0015/1194.html
- Basta György hadvezér levelezése és iratai.[Giorgio Basta military leader's letters and documents]. II. Volume. 1602-1607 Editor and translator: Dr. Veress, Endre. Budapest, 1913. Akadémiai Kiadó 974 p
- Benda, Kalman: Bocskai 1557–1606. First edition 1942, Second edition 1993. Budapest
- Benda, Kalman: Habsburg-abszolutizmus és rendi ellenállás a XVI–XVII. században(The Habsburg absolutism and the resistance of the Estates in Hungary in the XVI-XVII centuries) Tankönyvkiadó, Bp., 1975
- Benda Kálmán–Kenéz Győző: Barbiano generális jelentése a Bocskai-szabadságharc első hónapjairól. In: Hajdu Bihar megyei muzeumok kozlemenyei 19.szam. Hajduk a magyar történelemben II. Debrecen 1972. 5-29. p
- Benda Kálmán–Péter Katalin: Az országgyűlések a kora újkori magyar történelemben; MTA Történettudományi Int–OPI, Bp., 1987
- Benda Kalman:Bocskai szabadsagharc. Budapest, 1955, 159 p
- Bocskai István levelei(Letters of Istvan Bocskai) (1992)
- Csonka, Ferenc (1988). Bocskai kíséretében a Rákosmezőn. Budapest. ISBN 963-07-4647-6.
- Dobos Sándor (2 October 2010). "Kitör a Bocskai-felkelés (1604)".
- Istvánffy, Miklós Historianum de rebus Ungaricis libri. 1622 (Nicolai IsthuanfI Pannoni Historiarum de rebus Vngaricis libri 34, Antoni Hierati, 1622
- Nagy László: Hajdúvitézek. Bp. 1986. 160-161
- Nagy Laszlo: Bocskai es kora. Tanulmanyok a Bocskai szabadsagharc 400 adik evfordulojara. Martin optik kiado, Budapest, 2005. 114p
- Nagy László (1981). Bocskai István a hadak élén. Budapest. ISBN 963-326-291-7.
- Nagy, Laszlo(editor): Iratok Bocskai István és kora történetéhez]. Debrecen 2005. 257 p[Documents the time of István Bocskai and his contemporaries. A plenty of letter what connect to Bocskai uprising from 45 p some in Latin].
- Papp Sándor (2015). Török szövetség – Habsburg kiegyezés. Budapest. ISBN 978-963-236-859-7.
- Sinkovics(editor) :Magyar Történeti Szöveggyűjtemény[History text about the Hungarian History 1526-1790]1526-1790. I. Volume. Editor Istvan Sinkovics. Szeged 1968. Tankönyvkiado. 554.p
- Szerecz Miklós: Vitézség tükrei. Zrínyitől Rákócziig. – kézirat
