= Treaty of Vienna (1606) =

Peace treaty from 1606

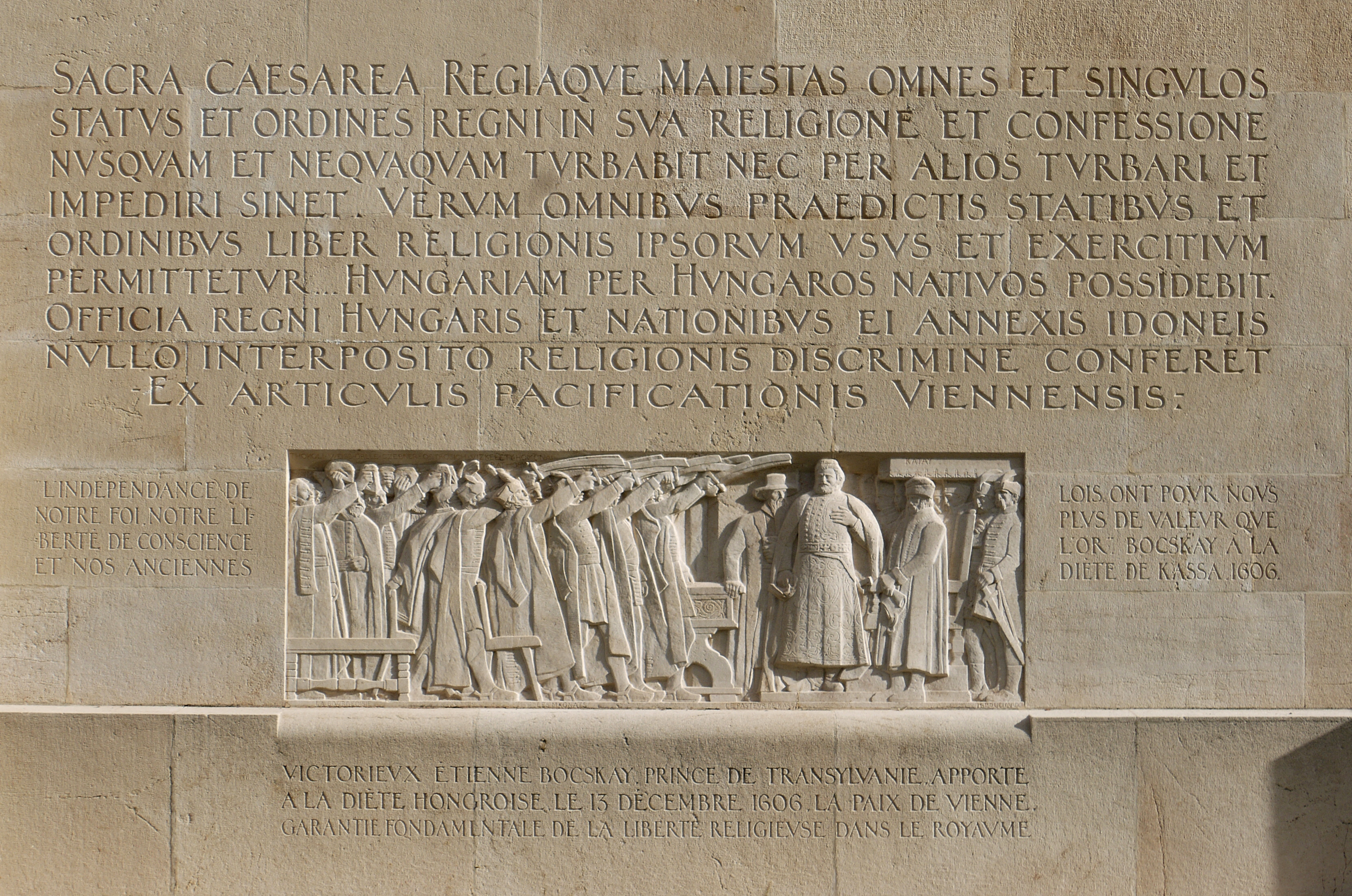
First sentences of the Treaty of Vienna at the Reformation Wall in Geneva.

The Treaty of Vienna (also known as the Peace of Vienna) was signed on 23 June 1606 between Stephen Bocskai, Prince of Transylvania, and Rudolf II, Holy Roman Emperor. Based on the terms of the treaty, all constitutional and religious rights and privileges were granted to the Hungarians in both Transylvania and Royal Hungary. In Sopron, for instance, the agreement recognized the autocracy of Hungarian Lutherans; in Transylvania, the Calvinists gained religious tolerance. The accord also recognized Bocskai as the Prince of Transylvania and guaranteed the right of Transylvanians to elect their own independent princes in the future.

Due to its importance for the Calvinists in Hungary and Transylvania, the first sentences of the treaty and its signing are depicted on the Reformation Wall in Geneva, a monument that honours important figures of the Protestant Reformation, next to the statue of Stephen Bocskay.

Since Stephen Bocskai had sought the support of the Ottoman Empire, the Treaty of Vienna was followed by the Peace of Zsitvatorok between Sultan Ahmed I and Archduke Matthias of Austria (11 November 1606).

== See also ==
- List of treaties
- Bocskai Uprising
- Peace of Zsitvatorok
