= Giovan Giacomo Barbiano di Belgioioso =

Italian commander

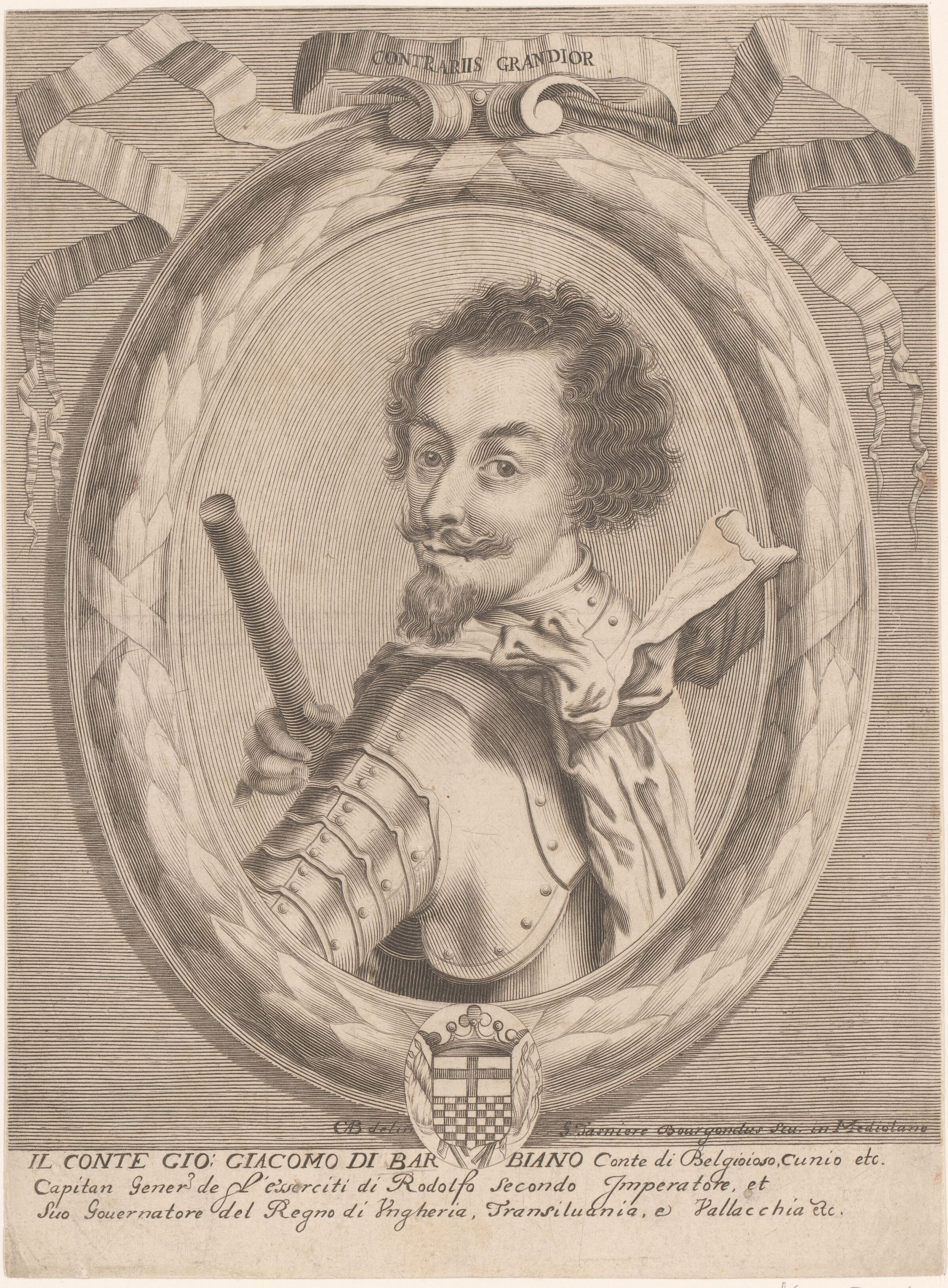
Giovan Giacomo Barbiano di Belgioioso

Giovan Giacomo Barbiano di Belgioioso or Belgiojoso (1565–1626) was an Italian commander in Habsburg service in the Low Countries and the Kingdom of Hungary.

== Life ==
Belgioioso was born in 1565 to Lodovico Barbiano and Barbara Trivulzio. His brother Alberico married Ippolita Borromeo, sister of Carlo Borromeo, Archbishop of Milan. In 1584 Belgioioso went to the Low Countries to join the Army of Flanders with the express purpose of fighting against the enemies of the Catholic Faith. He briefly served Charles Emmanuel I, Duke of Savoy, but then returned to Flanders. In 1598 he was appointed commissioner general of cavalry, and in 1601 he was named a councillor of war by Archduke Albert.

In 1597 he married a Flemish lady, Maria de Sensielles, who died without issue in 1602. In 1603 he remarried, to Anna Pottiers. Together they had a daughter, Maria, who in 1625 entered the Carmelite convent in Valenciennes.

In 1603 Rudolf II employed Belgioioso as captain general of imperial troops in Hungary. He was so shaken by the death of his brother Francesco in 1605 (killed in a quarrel with another imperial commander, Hermann Christof von Russwurm) that he eventually resolved to retire from active service.

Belgioioso spent his final years at Chokier Castle, near Liège. He died on 18 October 1626 and was buried in the Carmelite church in Liège.

== See also ==
- Belgioioso Castle
