= Long Turkish War =

1593–1606 Habsburg–Ottoman war

Long Turkish War Fifteen Years' War of Hungary
- Part of the Ottoman–Habsburg wars, Ottoman wars in Europe, & Moldavian Magnate Wars
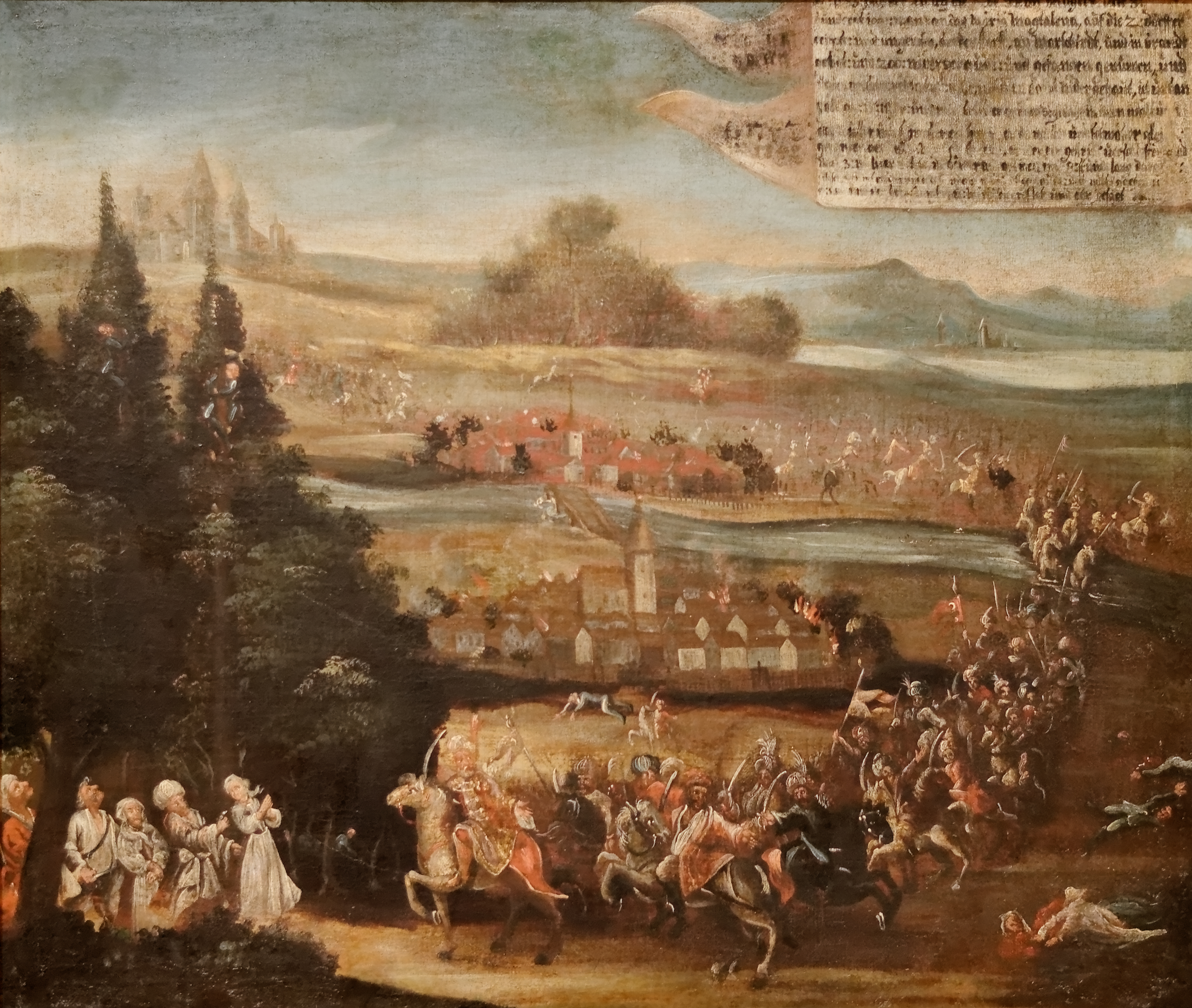
- Allegory of the Turkish war – The declaration of war before Constantinople
Date	29 July 1593 – 11 November 1606 (13 years, 3 months, 1 week and 6 days)
Location	Hungary, Wallachia, Balkans
Result	Inconclusive; Peace of Zsitvatorok
Territorial changes	Habsburgs gain Petrinja, Moslavina, and Čazma from the Ottomans.; Ottoman gains Pápa, Esztergom, Eger, Kanije from the Habsburgs.

Belligerents
Holy Roman Empire: (Holy Roman Empire) Habsburg monarchy; (Electorate of Saxony) Saxony; Mantua; (Duchy of Savoy) Piedmont-Savoy; Grand Duchy of Tuscany; (Spanish Empire) Southern Netherlands; Hungary; Croatia; Transylvania; Wallachia; Moldavia (Spanish Empire) Spain; Zaporozhian Cossacks; Serbian hajduks Papal States; Duchy of Ferrara (Polish–Lithuanian Commonwealth) Polish-Lithuanian Commonwealth Supported by: Safavid Iran (from 1603)	Ottoman Empire: Crimean Khanate; Nogai Horde; Hungarian Hajduk

Commanders and leaders
(Holy Roman Empire) Rudolf II (Mantua) Vincenzo I Gonzaga (Holy Roman Empire) Hermann Christof von Russwurm (executed) (Holy Roman Empire) Karl von Mansfeld (DOW) (Moldavia) (Wallachia) Michael the Brave † (Wallachia) Starina Novak (executed) (Holy Roman Empire) Ruprecht von Eggenberg; Ivan Drašković (Holy Roman Empire) Giorgio Basta; István Bocskai; Sigismund Báthory	(Ottoman Empire) Murad III (Ottoman Empire) Mehmed III (Ottoman Empire) Ahmed I (Ottoman Empire) Koca Sinan Pasha (Ottoman Empire) Cığalazade Yusuf Sinan Pasha (Ottoman Empire) Lala Mehmed Pasha (Ottoman Empire) Tiryaki Hasan Pasha (Ottoman Empire) Damat Ibrahim Pasha (Ottoman Empire) Telli Hasan Pasha †; Stephen Bocskai

Strength
More than 100,000 men	160,000–180,000

Casualties and losses
- 90,000 Ottoman and Habsburg military deaths

The Long Turkish War, or Thirteen Years' War, was an indecisive land war between the Holy Roman Empire (primarily the Habsburg monarchy) and the Ottoman Empire, primarily over the principalities of Wallachia, Transylvania, and Moldavia. It was waged from 1593 to 1606, but in Europe, especially in Hungary, it is called the Fifteen Years' War (Hungarian: tizenöt éves háború), reckoning from the 1591–1592 Turkish campaign that captured Bihać in the Kingdom of Croatia. In Turkey, it is called the Ottoman–Austrian War of 1593–1606 (Turkish: 1593–1606 Osmanlı-Avusturya Savaşı).

In the series of Ottoman wars in Europe, it was the major test of force in the time period between the Ottoman–Venetian War (1570–1573) and the Cretan War (1645–1669). The next of the major Ottoman–Habsburg wars was that of 1663–1664. Though the conflict featured a large number of costly battles and sieges, it produced little gain for either side.

== Overview ==
The major participants of the war were the Habsburg monarchy, the Principality of Transylvania, Wallachia, and Moldavia opposing the Ottoman Empire. Ferrara, Tuscany, Mantua, and the Papal States were also involved to a lesser extent.

=== War funding ===
The Ottoman invasion rallied larger than usual support behind the Holy Roman Emperor, though still nowhere near representing the Empire's full strength and far from what Rudolf II had hoped for when he had petitioned the Reichstag. The Reichstag convened in 1594, declared a legal state of Türkenkriege, and voted a substantial tax grant, renewing this four years later and again in 1603. Some 20 million florins were promised and at least four-fifths actually reached the imperial treasury. A further 7 to 8 million florins were paid when Rudolf appealed to the Circle assemblies as well, giving a total of roughly 23 million florins yielded by the minor German princes. The Habsburg monarchy itself raised around 20 million florins. Another 7.1 million flowed in from Italy, including both Imperial Italy and Papal and Spanish territories in Central and Southern Italy, respectively, as well as from Spain itself (including funds drawn from its territories inside the Empire). Thus the Austrian Habsburgs covered 40% of the imperial war effort, other imperial states covered around 50%, and around 10% came from outside the Empire (the Papal States and Castile). The imperial contributions were vital as the Ottoman sultan ruled a population over three times larger than that held by the Austrian Habsburg monarchy alone.

== Prelude ==
Skirmishes along the Habsburg–Ottoman border intensified from 1591. In 1592, the Croatian fort of Bihać fell to the Ottomans following the siege of Bihać.

In the spring of 1593, Ottoman forces from the Eyalet of Bosnia laid siege to the city of Sisak in Croatia, starting the Battle of Sisak that eventually ended in a victory for the Christian forces on 22 June 1593. That victory marked the end of the Hundred Years' Croatian–Ottoman War (1493–1593).

== History ==
=== 1593 ===
The Long Turkish War started on 29 July 1593, when the Ottoman army under Sinan Pasha launched a campaign against the Habsburg monarchy. The first engagement of the war was the Siege of Veszprém (Turkish: Vesprim) followed by the Siege of Várpalota (Turkish: Polata) in October 1593; Győr (Turkish: Yanıkkale) and Komárom (Turkish: Komaron) were captured in 1594.

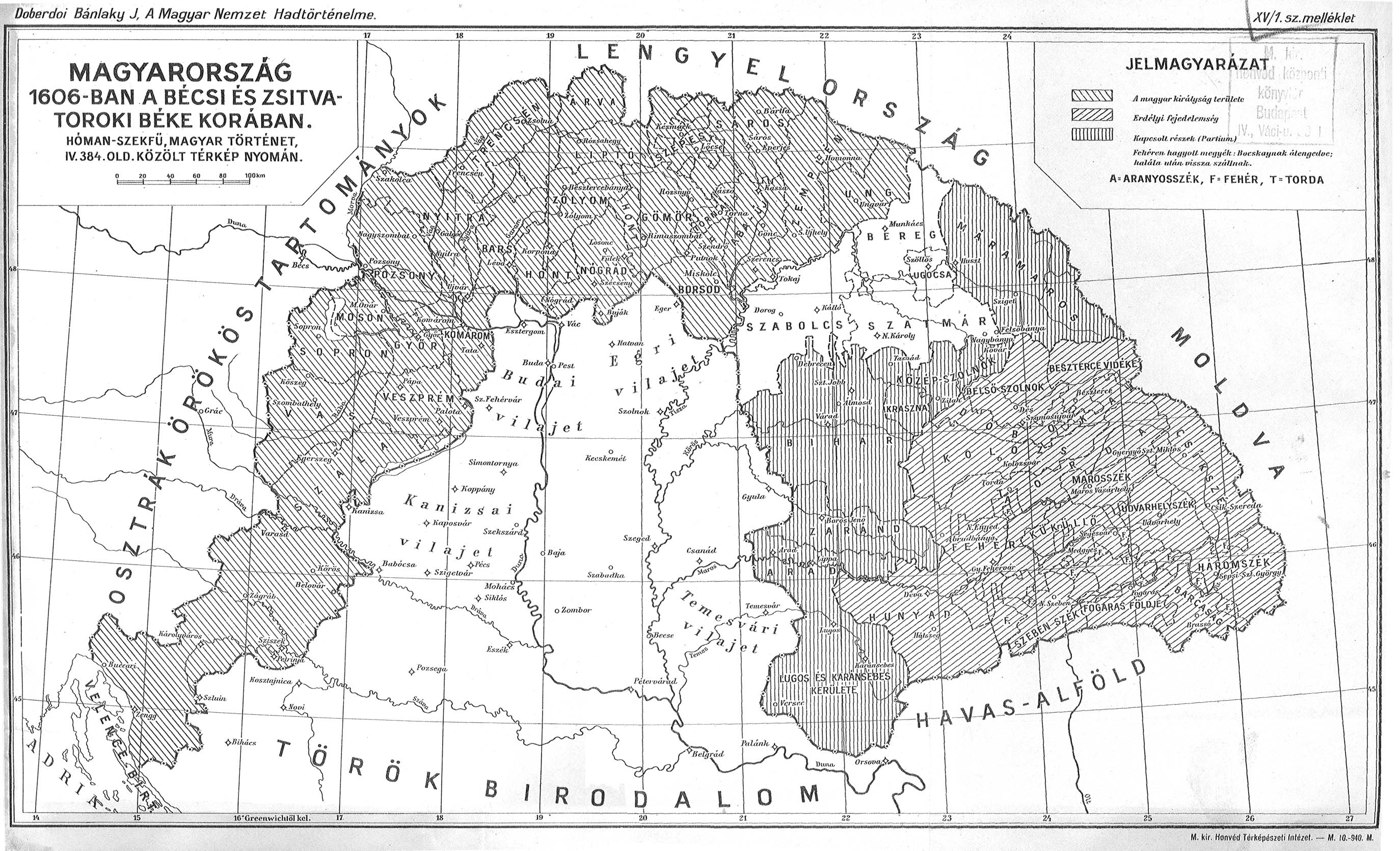
The divided Hungary during the Long Turkish war

=== 1594 ===
In early 1594, the Serbs in Banat rose up against the Ottomans. The rebels had, in the character of a holy war, carried war flags with the icon of Saint Sava. The war banners were consecrated by Patriarch Jovan Kantul, and the uprising was aided by Serbian Orthodox metropolitans Rufim Njeguš of Cetinje and Visarion of Trebinje. In response, Ottoman Grand Vizier Koca Sinan Pasha demanded that the green flag of the Prophet Muhammed be brought from Damascus to counter the Serb flag and ordered that the sarcophagus containing the relics of Saint Sava be removed from the Mileševa monastery and transferred to Belgrade via military convoy. Along the way, the Ottoman convoy killed all the people in its path as a warning to the rebels. The Ottomans publicly incinerated the relics of Saint Sava on a pyre atop the Vračar plateau on 27 April and had the ashes scattered.

=== 1595–96 ===
After the capture of Raab from the Ottomans in 1598, Adolf von Schwarzenberg modified the Schwarzenberg coat of arms to include the head of a Turk.

In 1595, an alliance of Christian European powers was organized by Pope Clement VIII to oppose the Ottoman Empire (the Holy League of Pope Clement VIII); a treaty of alliance was signed in Prague by the Holy Roman Emperor, Rudolf II and Sigismund Báthory of Transylvania. Aron Vodă of Moldavia and Michael the Brave of Wallachia joined the alliance later that year. The Spanish Habsburgs sent an army of 6,000 experienced infantry and 2,000 cavalry from the Netherlands under Karl von Mansfeld, commander-in-chief of the Spanish Army of Flanders, who took command of the operations in Hungary. During the entire war, Cossack and Polish cavalry troops were present at the fronts of Hungary, Wallachia and Transylvania. The papal auxiliaries were made up mainly of Walloon and Italian mercenaries, and to a small extent French and English mercenaries. The Habsburg army also employed Walloon mercenaries.

Persia indirectly supported the war against the Ottomans in Hungary and the Balkans.

The Ottomans' objective in the war was to seize Vienna, while the Habsburg monarchy wanted to recapture the central territories of the Kingdom of Hungary controlled by the Ottoman Empire. Control of the Danube line and possession of the fortresses located there was crucial. The war was mainly fought in Royal Hungary (mostly present-day western Hungary and southern Slovakia), Transdanubia, Royal Croatia and Slavonia, the Ottoman Empire (Rumelia – present-day Bulgaria and Serbia), and Wallachia (in present-day southern Romania).

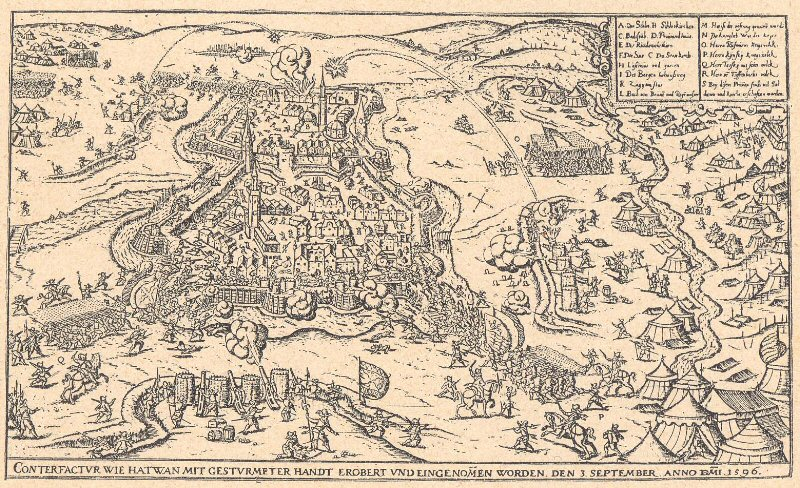
Habsburg troops take the Hatvan castle in 1596

In 1595, the Christians, led by Mansfeld, captured Esztergom and Visegrád, strategic fortresses on the Danube, but they did not lay siege to the key fortress of Buda. The Ottomans launched a siege of Eger (Turkish: Eğri), conquering it in 1596.

In 1595 in the Balkans, a Spanish fleet of galleys from the Kingdom of Naples and Kingdom of Sicily under Pedro de Toledo, marquis of Villafranca, sacked Patras, on the Rumelia Eyalet of the Ottoman Empire, in retaliation for Turkish raids against the Italian coasts. The raid was so spectacular that Sultan Murad III discussed exterminating the Christians of Constantinople in revenge. He finally decided to order the expulsion of all unmarried Greeks from the city. In the following years, Spanish fleets continued to raid the Levant waters, but large-scale naval warfare between Christians and Ottomans did not resume. Instead, privateers such as Alonso de Contreras took on the role of harassing Ottoman ships.

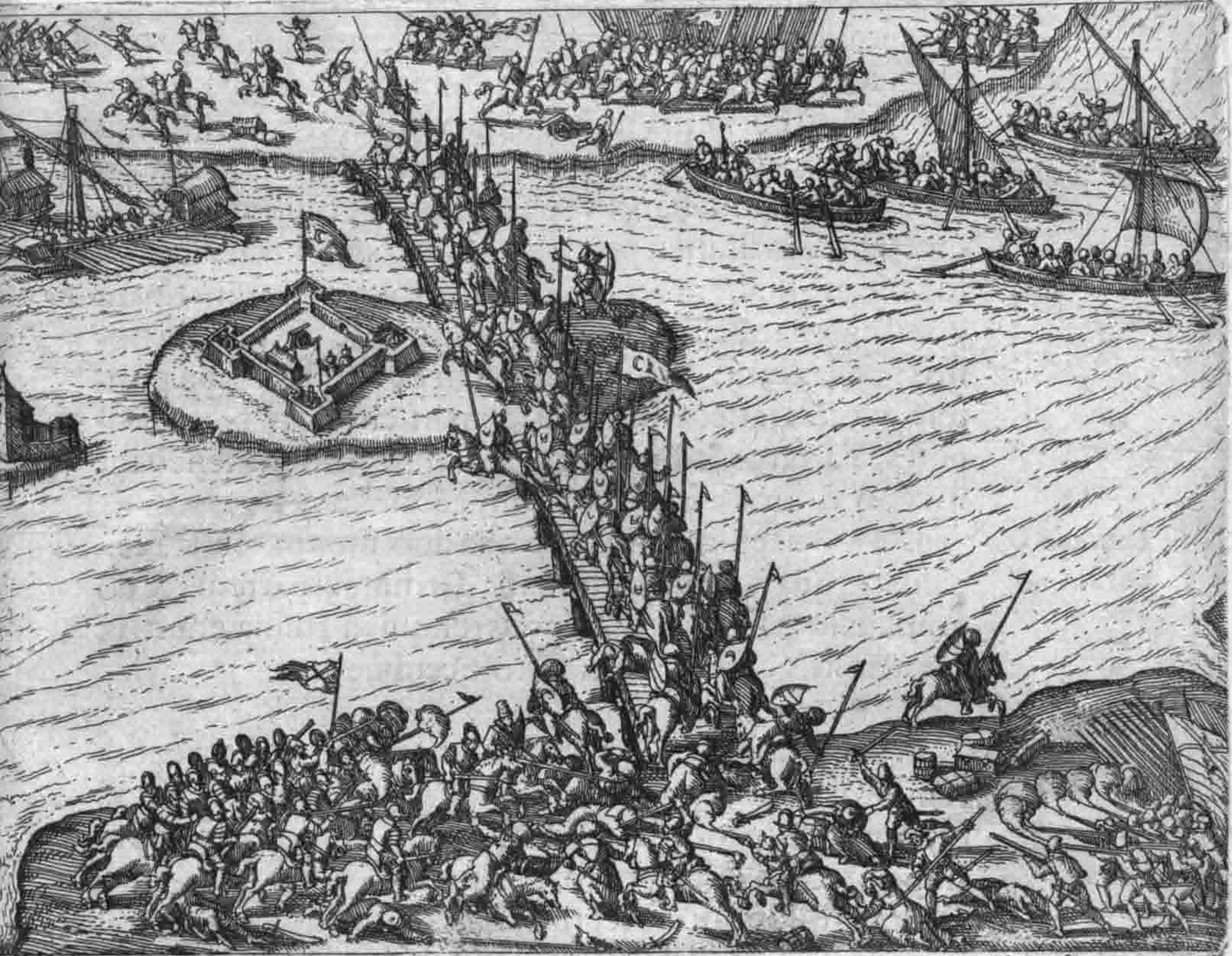
Battle of Giurgiu which ended with the victory of the united forces of Transylvania, Wallachia and Moldavia over the retreating Ottoman army

On the eastern front of the war, Michael the Brave, prince of Wallachia, started a campaign against the Ottomans in the autumn of 1594, conquering several castles near the Lower Danube, including Giurgiu, Brăila, Hârşova, and Silistra, while his Moldavian allies defeated the Ottoman armies in Iaşi and other parts of Moldova. Michael continued his attacks deep within the Ottoman Empire, taking the forts of Nicopolis, Ribnice, and Chilia, and even reaching as far as Adrianople. At one point his forces were only 24 kilometres (15 mi) from the Ottoman capital, Constantinople.

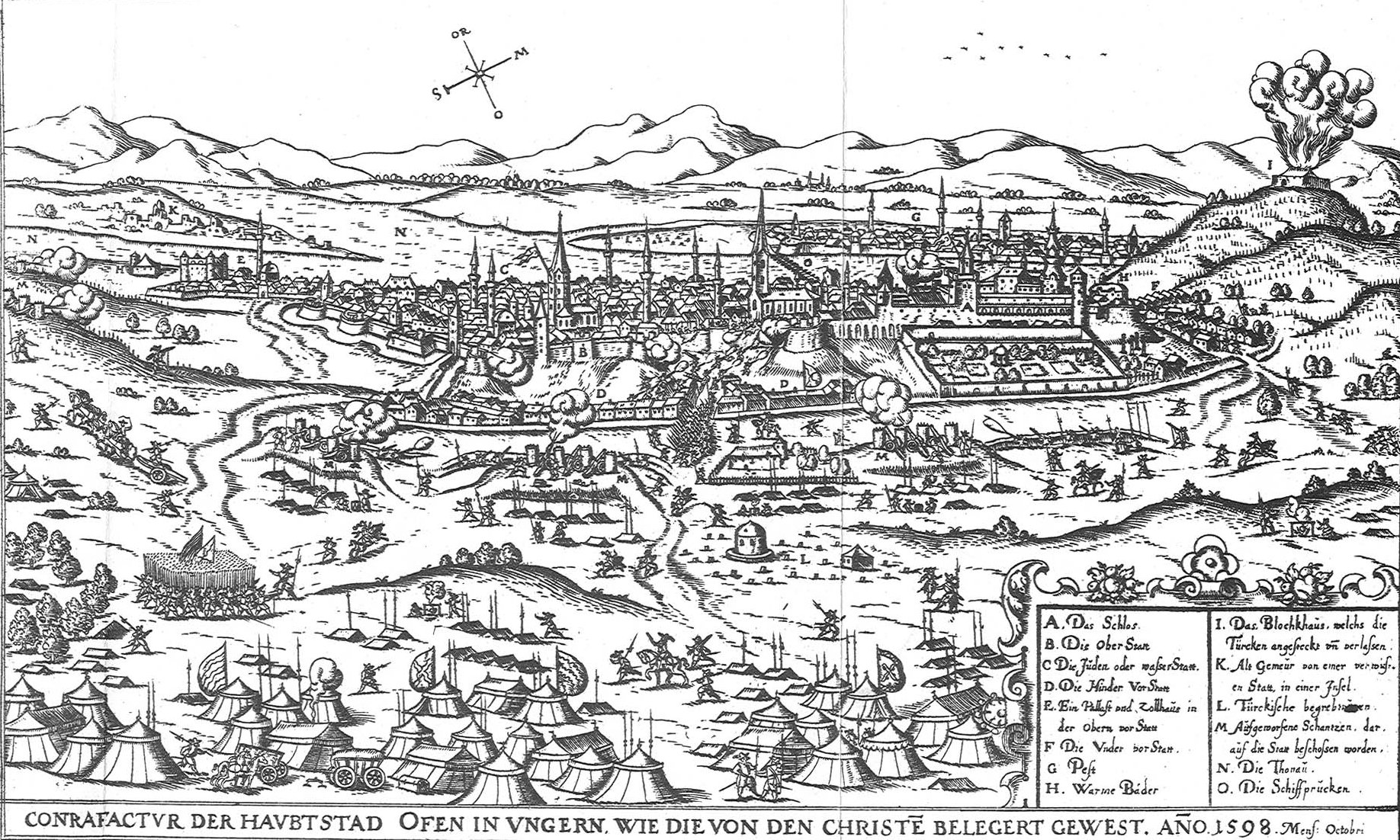
Siege of Buda in 1598

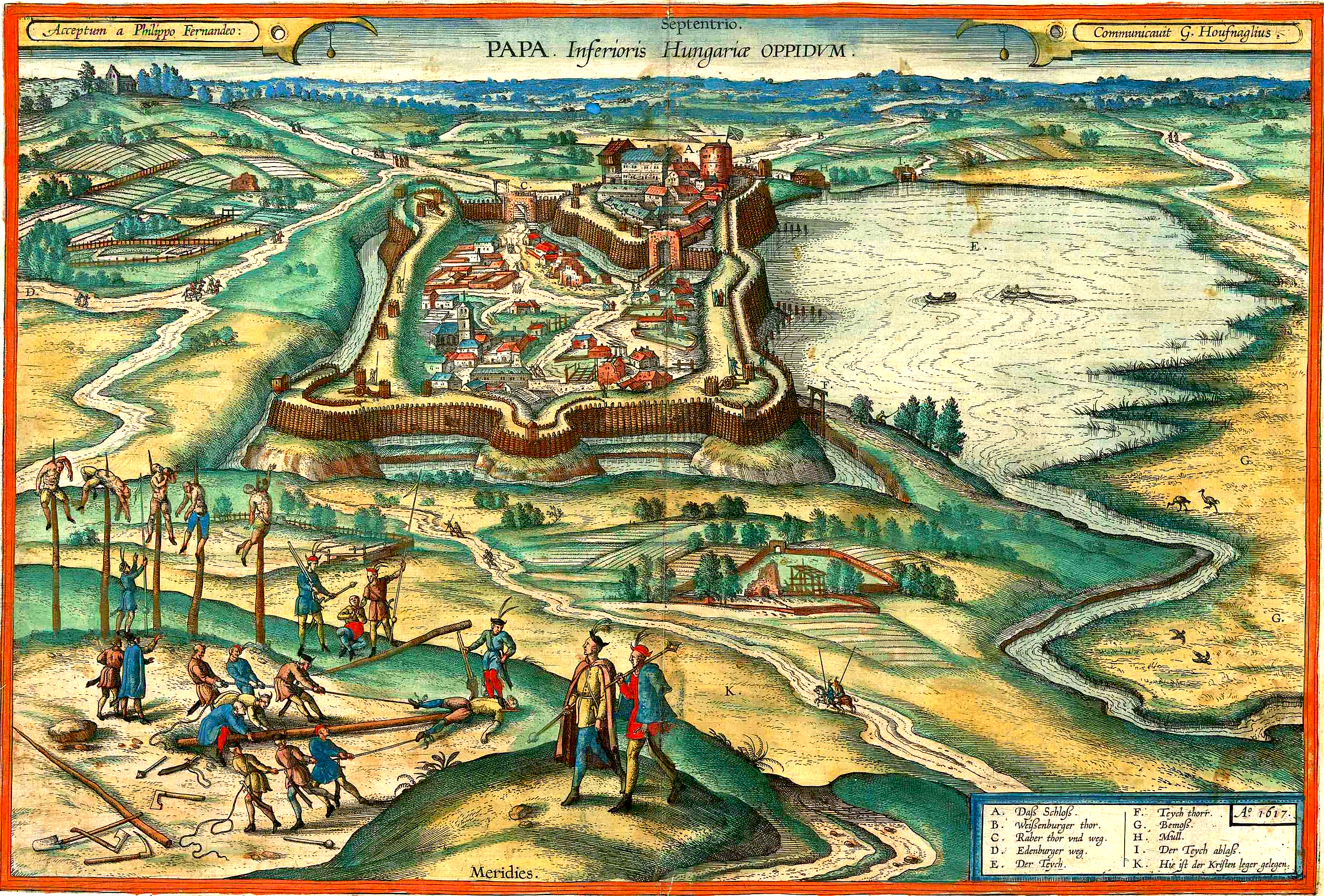
Impalement of mutinous Walloon mercenaries in 1600. The mercenaries at Pápa had mutinied over unpaid wages and attempted to surrender the castle to the Ottomans.

He was however forced to fall back across the Danube, and the Ottomans in turn led a massive counter-offensive (100,000 strong) which aimed to not only take back their recently captured possessions but also conquer Wallachia once and for all. The push was initially successful, managing to capture not only Giurgiu but also Bucharest and Târgoviște, despite fierce opposition at Călugăreni (23 August 1595). At this point the Ottoman command grew complacent and stopped pursuing the retreating Wallachian army, focusing instead on fortifying Târgoviște and Bucharest and considering their task all but done. Michael had to wait almost two months for aid from his allies to arrive, but when it did his counter-offensive took the Ottomans by surprise, managing to sweep through the Ottoman defences on three successive battlefields, at Târgoviște (18 October), Bucharest (22 October), and Giurgiu (26 October). The Battle of Giurgiu in particular was devastating for the Ottoman forces, which had to retreat across the Danube in disarray.

The war between Wallachia and the Ottomans continued until late 1599, when Michael was unable to continue the war due to poor support from his allies.

The turning point of the war was the Battle of Mezőkeresztes, which took place in the territory of Hungary on 24–26 October 1596. The combined Habsburg–Transylvanian force of 45–50,000 troops was defeated by the Ottoman army. The battle turned when Christian soldiers, thinking they had won the battle, stopped fighting in order to plunder the Ottoman camp. This battle was the first significant military encounter in Central Europe between a large Christian army and the Ottoman Turkish Army after the Battle of Mohács. Nevertheless, Austrians recaptured Győr and Komarom in 1598.

In 1599, the Turks and their Tatar allies attacked Prievidza, Topoľčany and other towns in the Nitra river valley in Upper Hungary, in what is now Slovakia, and took thousands of people into slavery.

=== 1601–06 ===
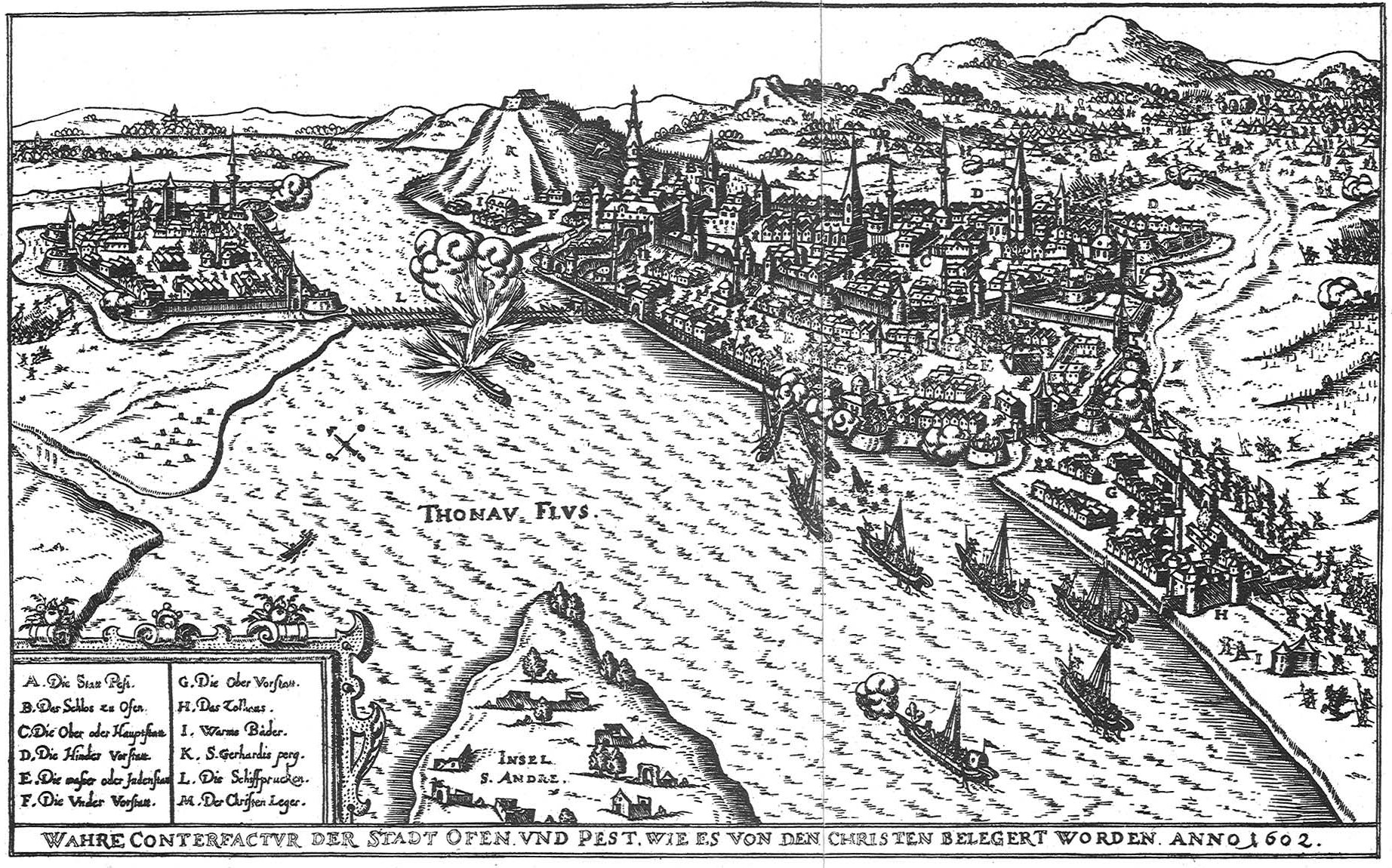
The siege of Buda in 1602

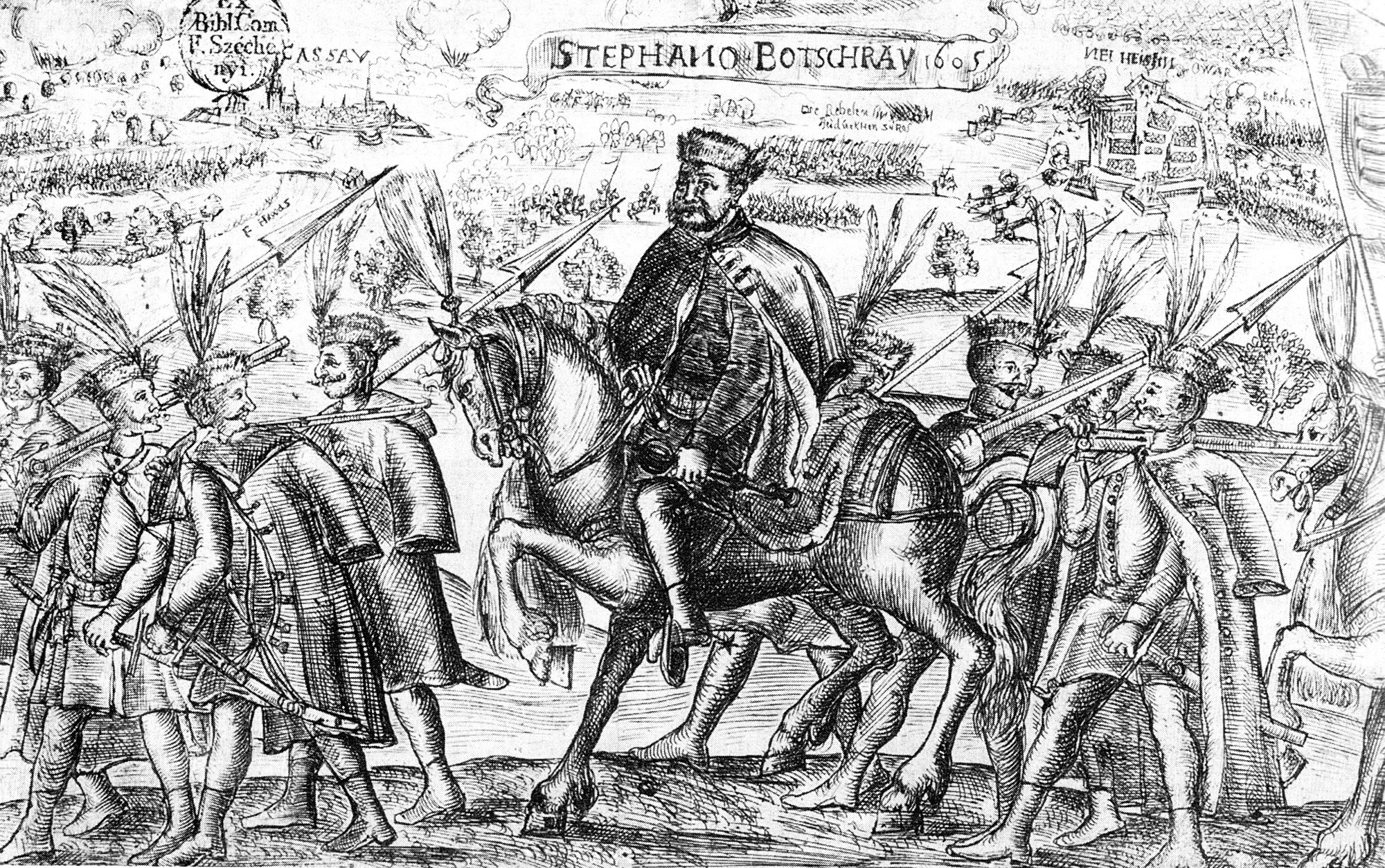
Hungarian Calvinist leader Stephen Bocskai and his hajduk warriors

In August 1601, at the Battle of Guruslău, Giorgio Basta and Michael the Brave defeated the Hungarian nobility led by Sigismund Báthory in Transylvania, who accepted Ottoman and Polish protection. After the assassination of Michael the Brave by mercenary soldiers under Basta's orders, the Transylvanian nobility, led by Mózes Székely, was again defeated at the Battle of Braşov in 1603 by the Habsburg Empire and Wallachian troops led by the voivode of Wallachia, Radu Şerban.

In September 1601, armies of the Holy Roman Empire laid siege to Nagykanizsa. Despite the numerical superiority, coalition armies had to abandon the siege two months later, due to heavy losses.

The last phase of the war (from 1604 to 1606) corresponds to the uprising of the Prince of Transylvania Stephen Bocskai. When Rudolf started prosecutions against a number of noble men in order to fill up the court's exhausted treasury, Bocskai, an educated strategist, resisted. He collected desperate Hungarians together with disappointed members of the nobility to start an uprising against the Habsburg ruler. The troops marched westwards, supported by the hajduk of Hungary, won some victories and regained the territories that had been lost to the Habsburg army until Bocskai was first declared the Prince of Transylvania (Marosvásárhely, 21 February 1605) and later also of Hungary (Szerencs, 17 April 1605). The Ottoman Empire supported Bocskai with a crown that he refused (being Christian). As Prince of Hungary he accepted negotiations with Rudolf II and concluded the Treaty of Vienna (1606).

== Aftermath ==
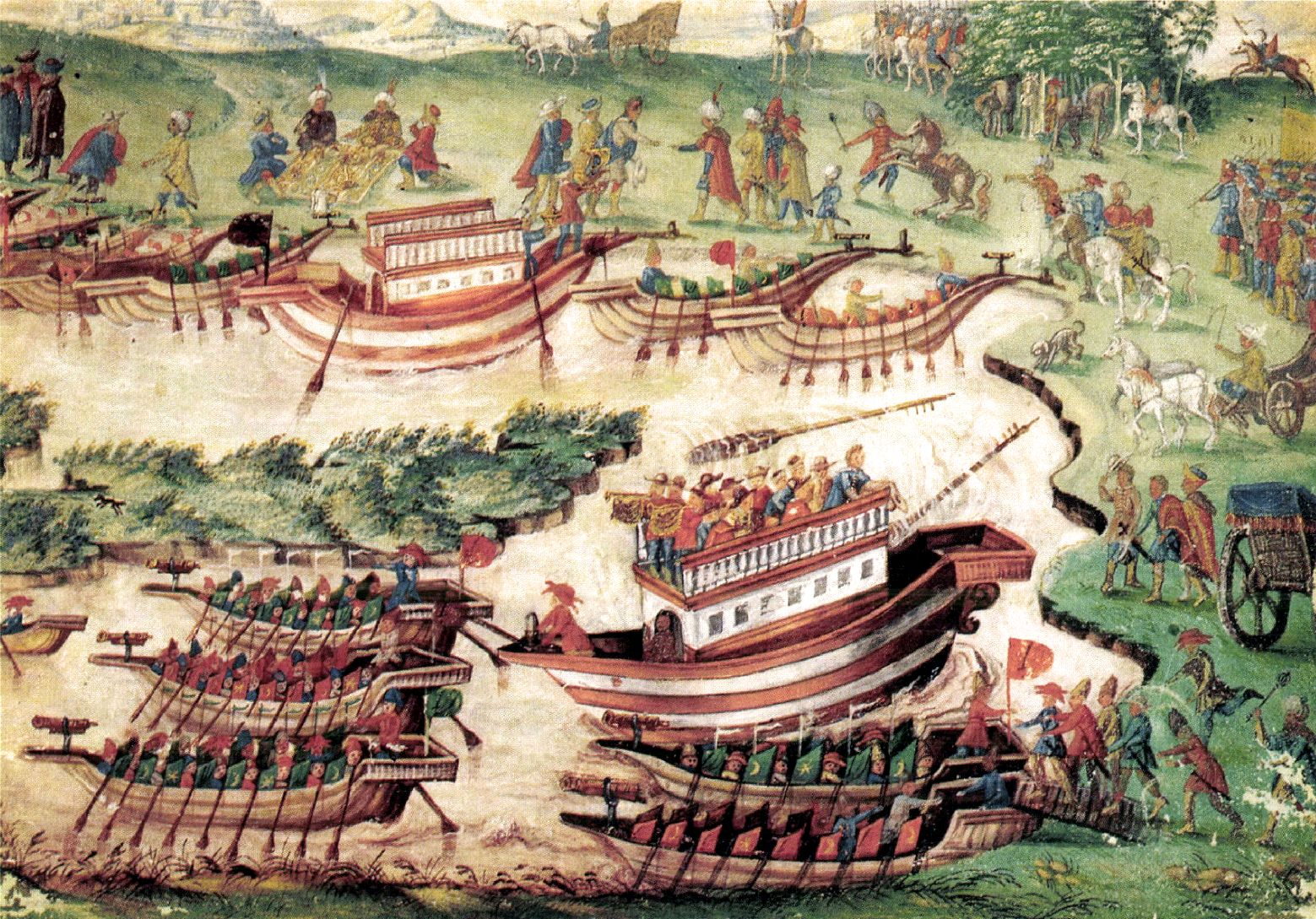
The peace negotiations in Zsitvatorok in 1606

The Long War ended with the Peace of Zsitvatorok on 11 November 1606, with meagre territorial gains for the two main empires – the Ottomans won the fortresses of Eger, and Kanizsa, but gave the region of Vác (which they had occupied since 1541) to Austria. The treaty confirmed the Ottomans' inability to penetrate further into Habsburg territories. It also demonstrated that Transylvania was beyond Habsburg power. Although Emperor Rudolf had failed in his war objectives, he nonetheless won some prestige thanks to this resistance to the Ottomans, by presenting the war as a victory. The sultan acknowledged his status as an equal and the treaty stabilized conditions on the Habsburg–Ottoman frontier. Also, Stephen Bocskai managed to retain his independence.

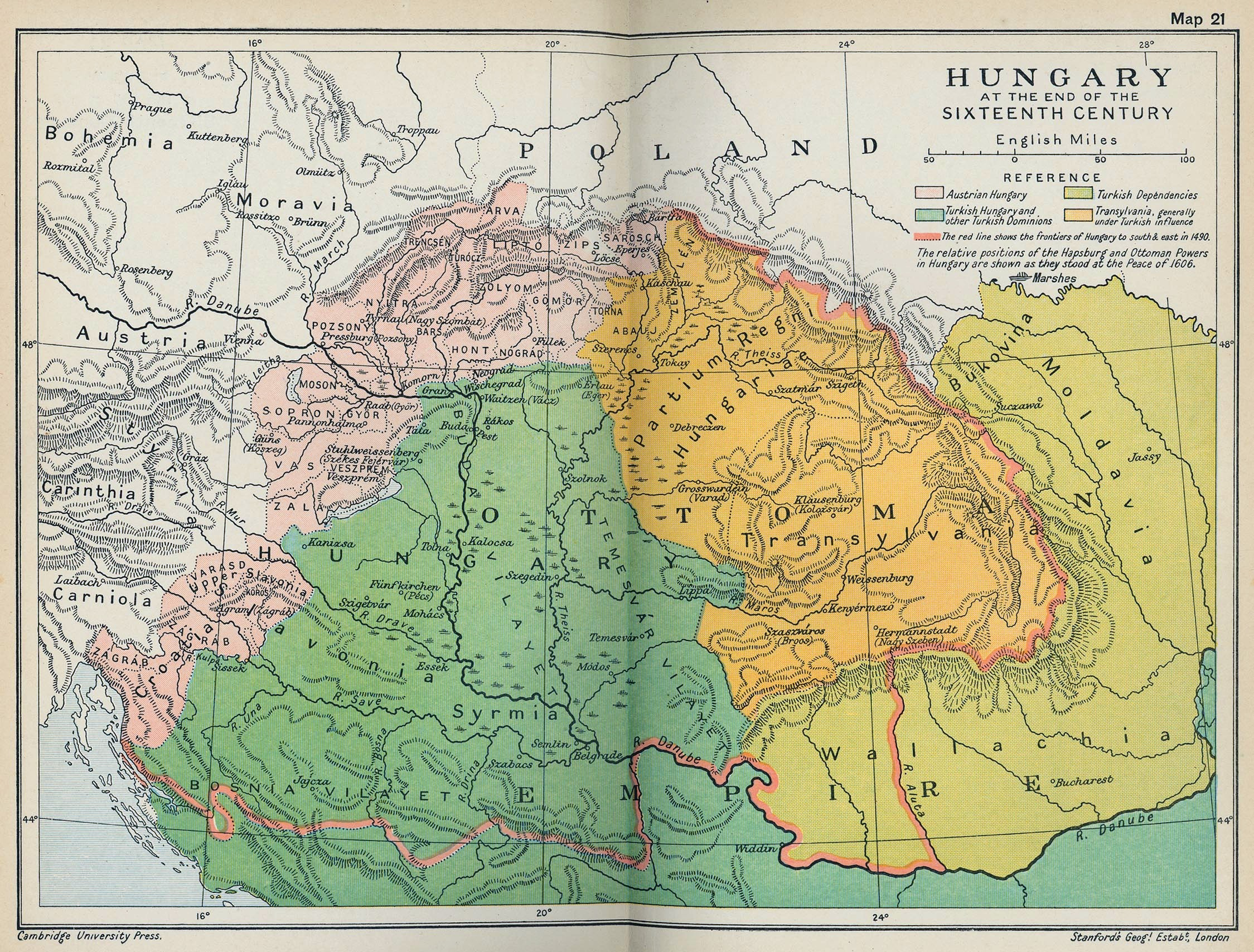
The partitioned Hungarian kingdom in the end of 16th century

Rudolf portrayed himself as victorious in the Long War, but this did not protect him from the Habsburg family's internal politics. Rudolf, by the end of the war, had massive debts to lenders, border troops and the field army, made concessions with the Hungarian nobility, and disappointed the princes of the Holy Roman Empire who had subsidized the Habsburg–Ottoman frontier. Once peace was concluded with the Ottomans, the Habsburgs turned on one another. This struggle forced the family to confront the unresolved matter of Rudolf's successor and culminated in the childless Emperor Rudolf being pitted against his brother Matthias in the Brothers' Quarrel.

== Battles ==
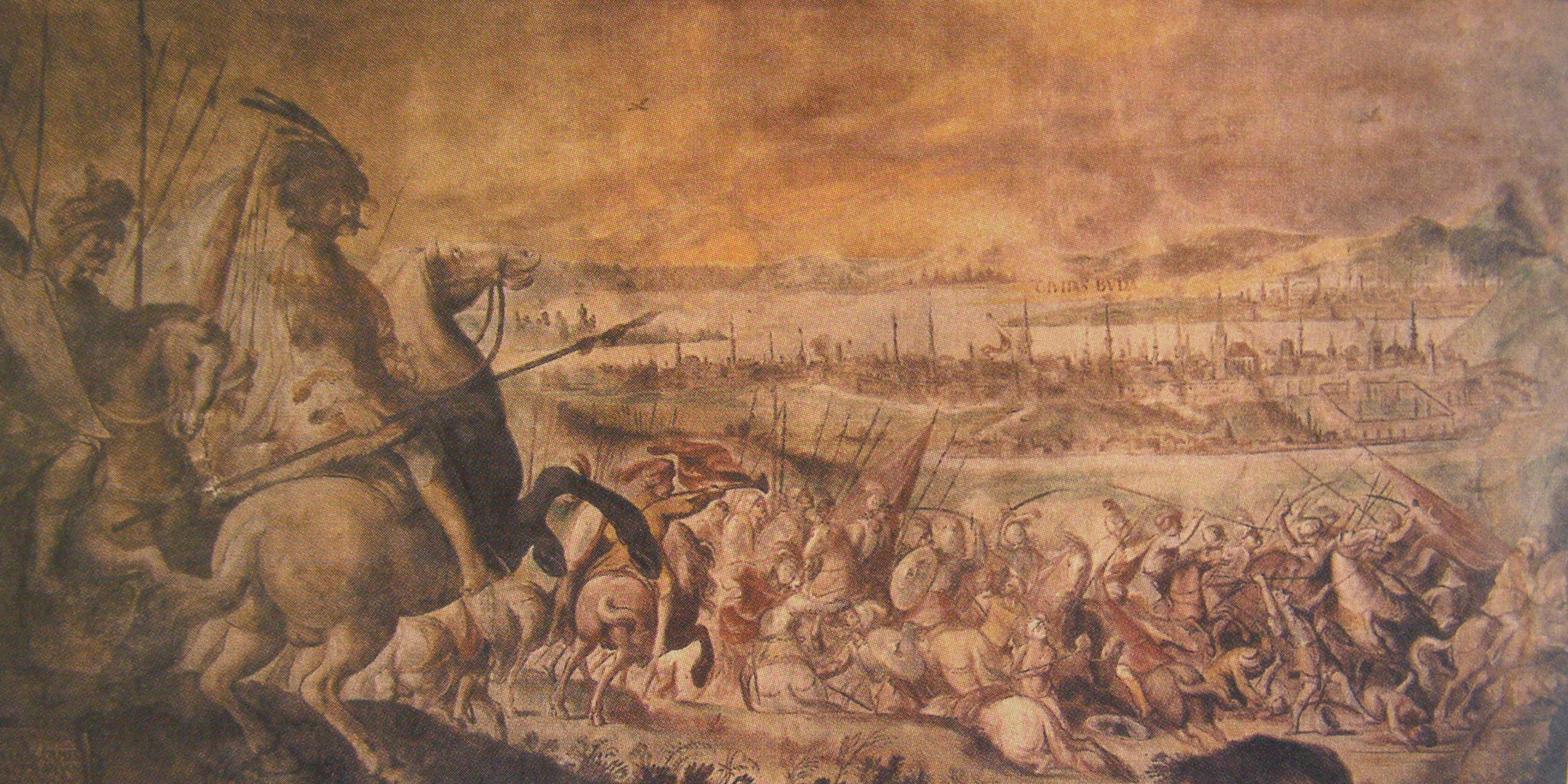
Siege of Buda

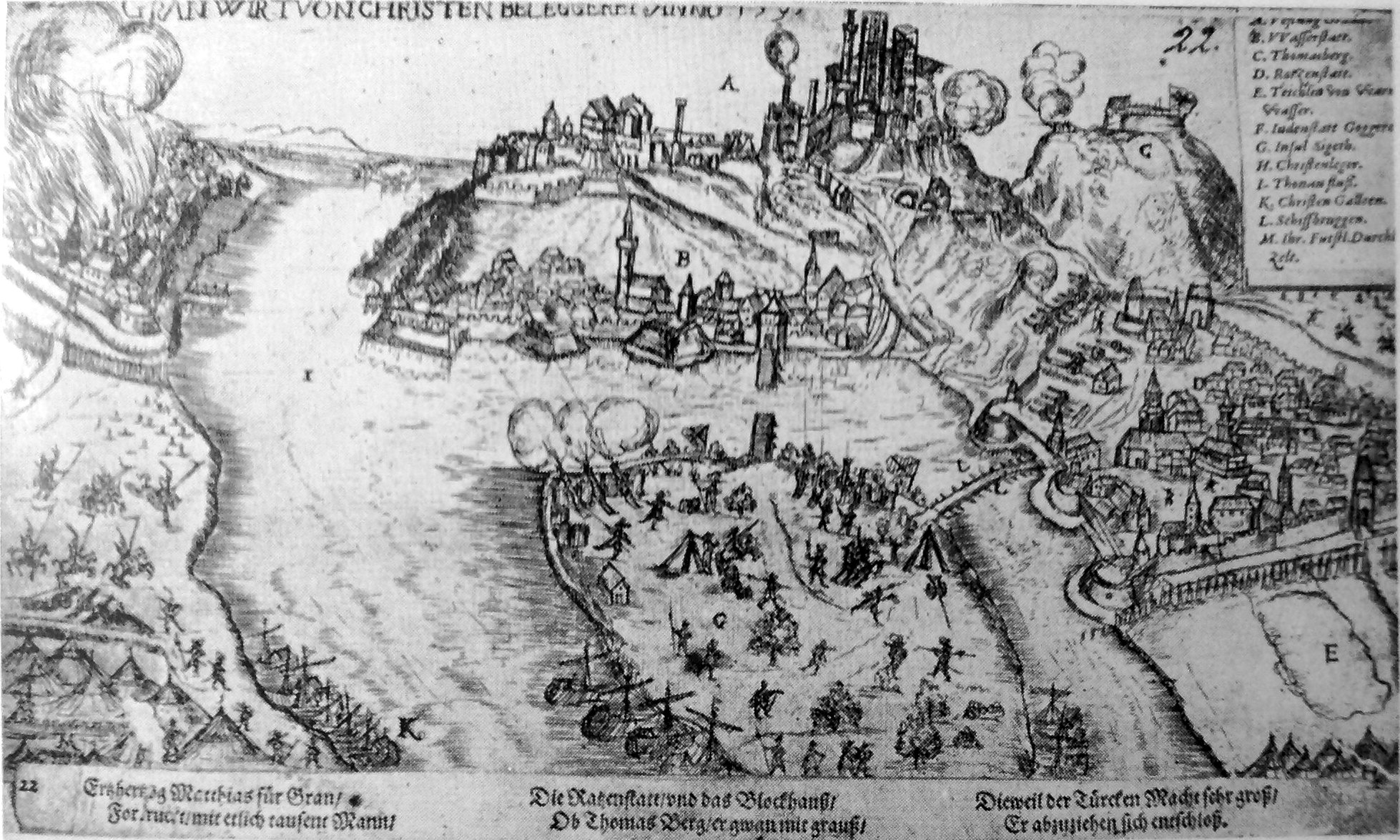
Siege of Esztergom in 1595

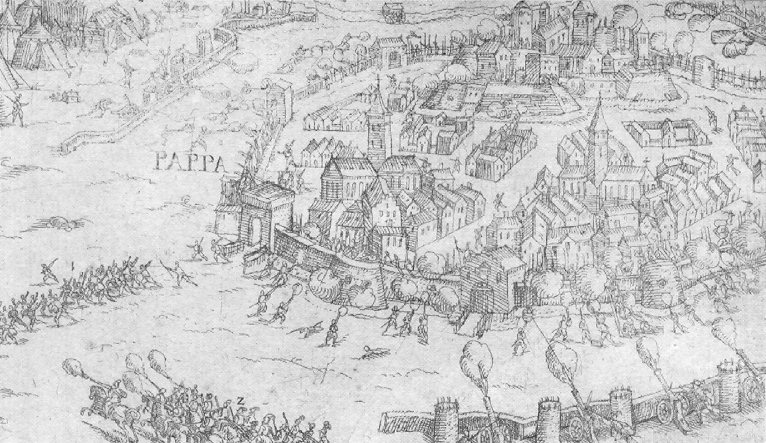
Recapture of Pápa in 1597

- Siege of Veszprém (1593)
- Siege of Várpalota (1593)
- Battle of Székesfehérvár (1593)
- Battle of Romhány (1593)
- Uprising in Banat (1594)
- Siege of Győr (1594) (Turkish: Yanık Kala, burned place, as a reference to the enormous damages caused by the siege).
- Battle of Călugăreni (1595)
- Battle of Giurgiu (1595)
- Siege of Esztergom (1596)
- Battle of Brest (1596)
- Siege of Eger (1596)
- Battle of Keresztes (1596)
- Serb Uprising of 1596–97
- Siege of Várpalota (1597)
- Siege of Győr (1598)
- Siege of Buda (1599)
- Battle of Mirăslău (1600)
- Siege of Nagykanizsa (1601)
- Battle of Guruslău (1601)
- Siege of Székesfehérvár (1601)
- Battle of Şelimbăr (1601)
- Siege of Székesfehérvár (1602)
- Battle of Braşov (1603)
- Siege of Buda (1603)

== See also ==
- Ferenc Nádasdy
- John Smith (explorer)
- Jindřich Matyáš Thurn
- Persian embassy to Europe (1599–1602)

== Sources ==
- Finkel, Caroline (1988). The Administration of Warfare: The Ottoman Military Campaigns in Hungary, 1593–1606. Vienna: VWGÖ. ISBN 3-85369-708-9.
- Ćirković, Sima (2004). The Serbs. Malden: Blackwell Publishing. ISBN 978-1-40514291-5.
- Várkonyi R., Ágnes (1985). Pach, Zsigmond Pál (ed.). Magyarország története 1526–1686. Budapest: Akadémiai Kiadó. ISBN 963-05-4098-3.
- Várkonyi R., Ágnes (2001). Ambrus, Éva; Révai, Gábor (eds.). Megújulások kora. Budapest: Magyar Könyvklub. ISBN 963-547-070-3.
