= Hermann Christof von Russwurm =

Imperial commander in the Long Turkish War

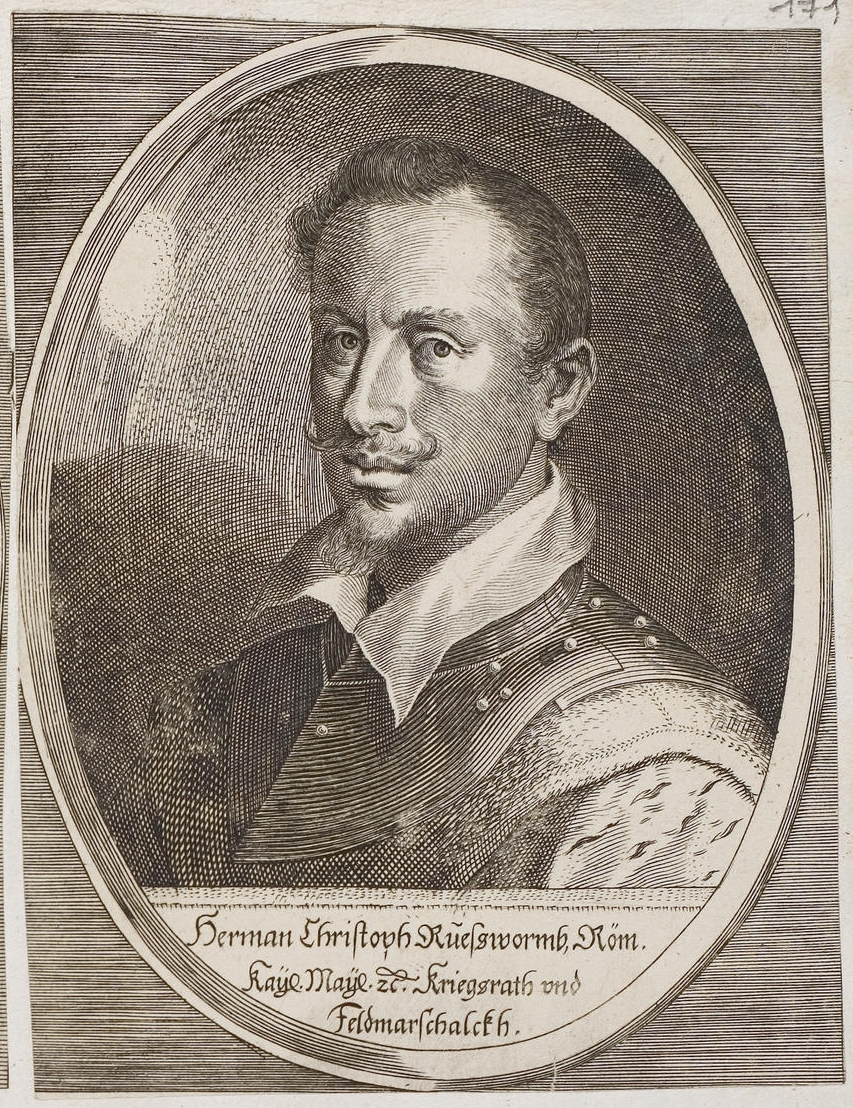
- Russwurm
- Born: Hermann Christof von Russwurm c. 1565; Saxe-Meiningen
- Died: November 29, 1605 (aged 40); Prague
- Military career
- Allegiance: Holy Roman Empire
- Service years: 1585–1605
- Rank: Feldmarschall
- Conflict: Long Turkish War

Hermann Christof, Count Russwurm (c. 1565–1605) was an imperial commander in the Long Turkish War.

== Biography ==
Russwurm was born in Frauenbreitungen, Sachsen-Meiningen, the son of Heinrich Russwurm the Younger and his wife Dorothea, probably in August 1565.

He began his military career in the Cologne War (1583–88), by the end of which he had become commander of Christophe de Bassompierre's personal guard. In 1590 he entered on his inheritance, and became an officer in the regiment of Hans Reichard von Schönberg, serving in Jülich. Distinguishing himself in command, he received an imperial commission as lieutenant colonel and instructions to raise a regiment for Charles, Margrave of Burgau, to serve against the Turks.

He was wounded at the Siege of Pápa in 1597.

In Autumn 1600, at a banquet in Prague, he unsuccessfully sought to provoke the Moravian nobleman Charles of Žerotín the Elder into a duel.

Russwurm commanded the imperial forces in failed attempts on Buda in 1602 and 1603.

In May 1605 Russwurm was made a count. On 24 July he became embroiled in a quarrel in which one of his servants killed Marshal Belgiojoso's brother. Tried as an accessory to the killing, he was beheaded in Prague on 29 November 1605, against the wishes of the Emperor Rudolf II.
