= Belgioioso =

Belgioioso or Belgiojoso may refer to:

- Belgioioso, Lombardy, a town in Lombardy, Italy
- Palazzo Belgioioso, a palace in Milan
- Villa Belgiojoso Bonaparte, a palace in Milan
- Belgioioso Castle, a castle in Lombardy
- Barbiano di Belgioioso, a prominent Lombard family
- BelGioioso Cheese, an artisanal cheese manufacturer, corporate headquarters in Denmark, Wisconsin, USA

== See also ==
- Ludovico Barbiano di Belgiojoso (disambiguation)
