= Sack of Lugo =

Riot and uprising against French troops

The Sack of Lugo was a riot and uprising against French troops by inhabitants of Lugo, Emilia-Romagna and neighbouring towns between 30 June and 8 July 1796.

== Context ==
Lugo was subject to the Papal States and was in effect ruled by the papal legate living in Ferrara. At the start of June legate Francesco Maria Pignatelli warned the Holy See that Bonaparte's army was only five miles from the border of the Papal States. On 21 June Pignatelli was summoned to Bologna for consultation but as soon as he arrived there he was dismissed and made a prisoner of war. The following day the 'Municipio' was established in Ferrara, swearing fealty to the Republic and declaring the city and the legation (including Lugo) freed from the Papal States.

On 23 June the French troops demanded that the local population hand in all pointed and edged weapons and firearms within 24 hours. They also emptied the public coffers, seizing 332,000 lira and imposing a contribution of more than 4 million livre tournois on the whole Legation of Ferrara, with fifteen days to raise it. They later also took possession of and ransacked the monte di Pietà.

The order to hand in weapons arrived in Lugo on 26 June, but - when the population had already partially complied - it was revoked on 28 June and weapons were returned to their rightful owners. The same day an order arrived from Ferrara about the contribution, explaining that that capital was only a loan and would be paid back. In Lugo the Trisi College was set as the place for contributions to be handed in.

== Course ==
=== 30 June ===
On the morning of the 30^{th}, two Republican commissioners, Commendatore Cremona and Doctor Scutelari, traveled from Ferrara to Lugo, tasked with ordering the communities of the Romagna estense to collect the funds. Between the 28^{th} and the 30^{th}, the people of Lugo had gathered, between cash and valuables, 18,000 scudi. The commissioners demanded the assets be handed over immediately, despite the lack of a warrant and that the fifteen-day deadline was still days away. The municipality's magistrates objected and refused. The two commissioners, interested in the market value of the silver, ordered soldiers to seize the silver bust of Hilary of Galeata, the patron saint of Lugo. (Note: In 1526, the Abbot of Galeata had donated an arm bone and a portion of the Saint's skull as relics at the request of the municipality. In 1689, the skull fragment had been enclosed in a silver reliquary. In 1708, the Carmelites, custodians of the Saint's veneration, commissioned a solid silver bust of Saint Hilary of Galeata. The relic was placed on the front of the bust. In 1793, the municipality had a small, Empire-style, gilded-wood throne constructed to hold the bust.) The bust was taken to Trisi College, an intolerable offense to the people of Lugo.

The commissioners had traveled on to Bagnacavallo in the afternoon and returned to Lugo that evening, where they again demanded the surrender of all assets. An uprising broke out, with the insurgents seizing the weapons that had been requisitioned on the 26^{th} but not yet returned to their owners and taking control of the municipality, preventing the assets being handed over. The mount of piety and Trisi College were placed under strict guard. The municipality's governor was forced to take refuge in the convent. (Note: On 2 July, he was allowed to return to his native Imola.) The two commissioners from Ferrara had vanished.

During the night, around fifty of the insurgents traveled to Castel Bolognese, which had a gunpowder factory. They returned to Lugo with a cart full of the powder.

=== 1 July ===
A Republican municipal government established itself in Lugo, replacing the papal insignia with its own.

The insurgents traveled to each house, rallying support and spreading the call to take up arms against the French. The Manzoni family, one of the most prominent families in Lugo and the Romagna estense as well as one of the key instigators of the uprising, supplied the insurgents with additional weapons and with horses. In the late morning, the insurgents entered the town hall, seized the municipal standard, and, accompanied by the beating of drums, marched with it to Trisi College.

There, in front of the crowd, the standards of the Pope and the Cardinal Legate were once more raised. The populace was called upon to join the insurgents. Alarm bells rang to alert the peasants. With around 600 people gathered, Count Giambattista Manzoni, age 34, was chosen to lead the rebellion. Trisi College became their headquarters.

Around noon, a "Notice" was posted on the city walls, reading:

The critical circumstances in which the people of Lugo find themselves due to the French invasion of the Papal States and attempts to amass the greatest possible plunder from their assets, alongside the constant threat of personal injury, have required them to take up arms in defense of their patron Saints, the Sovereign, the State, and the Fatherland. Therefore, this is made known to everyone, so that all may join in ensuring their shared salvation in the face of the communal danger. They trust that all, animated by their holy religious zeal, by attachment to His Holiness, their legitimate Sovereign, and by love of the Fatherland, will unanimously support this glorious undertaking by enlisting under the glorious Standards of the Church.

Issued from Headquarters in Lugo, this 1^{st} day of July, 1796.

Lugo, printed by Giovanni Melandri, Bearer of the Seal of the Chamber.

The notification spread throughout Romagna estense as well as neighboring Ravenna and Bologna. Simultaneously, four citizens had been dispatched to neighboring towns, urging them to take up arms alongside the people of Lugo. Cotignola, Barbiano, Massa Lombarda and Sant'Agata all responded favorably, while long-standing rival Bagnacavallo and Fusignano declined to join the uprising. Bagnara, Solarolo, and Mordano joined with the insurgents. Sentries were stationed along all roads into Lugo and outside the city gates with orders to stop all modes of transport and search outsiders.

=== 2 July ===
Cardinal Gregorio Chiaramonti, (Note: The future Pope Pius VII) then Bishop of Imola, sent a letter to the local municipalities upon learning of the revolt that read in part:

Any action taken while the Holy See is negotiating for an armistice and peace would be inopportune, dangerous, and contrary to the spirit of submission that any principality has the right to expect of its subjects.

The letter was attached to an official proclamation. It noted that similar attempts in the past had ended in tragedy, pointing out that the people of Lugo had "neither battle-hardened soldiers, nor adequate arms, nor a fortress, nor provisions, nor a united purpose." Chiaramonti called upon them to lay down their arms and collect the war levy.

On receiving the notice and its attached letter, the public officials forwarded it to the insurgents' headquarters. The rebels went to the Town Hall and forbade the Magistrate from publicly posting the edict, then demanded the restoration of the bust of Saint Hilary. Out of respect for the sacred image, they did not take it by their own hands, but instead called for the parish priest of the Church of the Carmine.

The bust was returned to the church and the insurgents decided to hold a three-day period of prayer. During the devotional period, the bust remained on the altar to be venerated by the faithful.

The same day, Napoleon Bonaparte learned of the insurgency taking place in Lugo while on his way to Bologna.

=== 3 July ===
Count Giambattista Manzoni resigned command of the insurgents, turning it over to Francesco Mongardini, who assumed the nom de guerre "Buonapace". As Mongardini was a blacksmith by trade, this change made it so that the revolt was being led by one of the people.

Bishop Chiaramonti enlisted Giuseppe Capelletti, the chargé d'affaires for the Kingdom of Spain who lived in Bologna, to negotiate. Capelletti arrived in Lugo in the afternoon. He outlined proposed terms to the insurgents: the French would peacefully enter Lugo and would not engage in hostilities; and the rebels would both give up their arms and not oppose the war levy. Capelletti's visit was unsuccessful and he left that evening.

After his departure, a report that the French had reached the Traversara Pass on the Lamone, just east of Bagnacavallo, spread through Lugo. People poured into the streets as the church bells rang out the alarm. That night, an armed group set out to confront the French, but their enemy never appeared as the earlier report proved to be unfounded.

=== 4 July ===
The Bishop of Imola tried once more to end the rebellion by writing to the legal advisor for the Lugo community, Dr. Luigi Zaccari. In his letter, Cardinal Chiaramonti requested that five prisoners be released, which he stated would be a gesture of good will towards those convicted of political crimes. The Bishop's requests were denied.

On 2 July, Napoleon had sent the following instruction to Rome:

He will require the Roman Curia to restore order to the Romagna and to punish the printer and authors of the attached proclamation. (Note: Attached was the notice posted in Lugo on 1 July.) If, in a few days time, the people have not relinquished their arms and peace has not been restored, I myself will send two battalions to disperse the insurgents, disarm them, punish the guilty, and restore good order.

Napoleon then ordered those forces stationed at Ferrara and Ravenna to leave those legations and join units stationed north of the Po. He was preparing for a crucial clash with the Austrian Army. Only the troops under the command of Colonel Pourailly remained in Ferrara.

The fourth passed without major incidents or upheaval in Lugo. Many farmers returned to work in the fields; however, the armed populace, recognizing Mongardini as their sole commander, dominated the town. That evening, they received the news of the French troops' withdrawal from Ravenna and Ferrara. Some of the insurgents saw this as a first victory, but others perceived danger. Of Lugo's leading families, only the Manzoni counts and the Dal Buono nobles remained, the others having fled Lugo.

=== 5 July ===
As the third day of prayer began around 11 AM, a messenger arrived in Lugo with news that a French detachment from Faenza was approaching the city. The sixty men had set out initially from Forlì, their orders to arrest Giovanni Melandri, the printer listed on the publicly posted proclamation. The soldiers had not received precise information about the revolt, so did not take particular precautions in their approach, and were ambushed by the insurgents near the casino Bolis. (Note: This is modern-day Villa Bolis, which stands a few kilometers from the center of town.)

There were several French casualties, but the rebels remained unharmed. The insurgents then beheaded two of the deceased French officers, mounted their heads on two long poles, and marched back through Lugo with them. Cheering crowds flanked them as they made their way to Trisi College and displayed the severed heads on the balcony of their headquarters.

Two letters arrived at midnight. One, from the Spanish representative in Capelletti, offering to mediate in extremis.

The other letter was from Chiaramonti, a final attempt to resolve the situation with the insurgents emerging unscathed. It stated that four citizens of Lugo, two administrators and two "Elders", would meet with the commander of the French troops in Forlì, Martial Beyrand. (Note: Beyrand had arrived in Imola on the fifth.) Peace negotiations would then begin. The insurgents accepted the proposal immediately, appointing Count Angelo Manzoni; Giovanni Foschini, a lawyer; Giacomo Ascanio Matteucci, a doctor; and Vincenzo Zanotti as their representatives. All were from families prominent in Lugo.

=== 6 July ===
Overnight, Beyrand held a war council in Imola to determine what terms he would require of the insurgents. Capelletti would be mediator. The location for negotiations had been agreed as Bagnara, situated between both Lugo and Imola on the right bank of the Santerno.

Beyrand's first stipulation was for the people of Lugo to receive the occupying French troops peacefully. In exchange, he would provide amnesty for those insurgents relinquishing arms and a 24-hour armistice.

At 5 AM, the four representatives from Lugo set out. However, when they arrived, they did not have credentials on them, and were not able to formally represent Lugo in the negotiations.

Meanwhile, General Augereau had ordered Pourailly to take his troops in Ferrara and march on Lugo. In the early afternoon, news reached Lugo that French troops had just passed Argenta. (Note: The town is located on the Po di Primaro, which forms a natural boundary between the territories of Lugo and Ferrara.) The people of Lugo immediately believed they had been double-crossed, with Beyrand offering peace while Augereau waged war. The church bells rang out the alarm and a short time later, all the armed men of Lugo marched toward the Po di Primaro.

Augereau sent a letter to Count Manzoni, the most prominent of Lugo's delegates, stating his intention to enter the territory of Lugo on the 7^{th} as a friend and personally negotiate a final agreement. This would have voided any of the negotiations at Bagnara, had Lugo's representatives been permitted to negotiate any terms. However, Augereau's true intent was to attack from the north with Pourailly and from the south with both Beyrand's troops and his own.

As they moved to intercept French troops before they reached the Santerno River, the insurgents sought reinforcements from Bagnacavallo, who promised 2,000 scudi within two days, and from Fusignano, who flatly refused assistance to the rebels. Lugo's men clashed with 500 French soldiers at La Frascata, 9 km (5.6 mi) south of Argenta and 14.5 km (9.0 mi) north of Lugo, near one of the Manzonis' fortified villas. The rebels were able to halt the French advance by using the embankment of the Santerno as a defensive bulwark, with the battle ending as night fell.

=== 7 July ===
The battle resumed at dawn, with the insurgents focused on preventing French troops from fording the Santerno. (Note: The Santerno flows south to north, with Argenta on its left bank and Lugo on its right.) After two hours of continuous fire, French troops made one last push to cross at Cà di Lugo, 4 km (2.5 mi) from the center of town. Pourailly, who had been wounded and commanded only 300 soldiers, retreated, taking his remaining troops south of Lugo and camping along the road to Felisio.

At the same time, Augereau assembled 800 infantry and 200 cavalry at Imola. The insurgents were able to amass an equal number of fighters, and concentrated nearly the entire force along the banks of the Santerno, believing the French would attempt their attack from the river once more. Only a small garrison from Cotignola remained on the Faenza side. They had taken up positions along the Ripe road, which runs east to west, cutting across the road to Felisio and separating the territory of Cotignola from that of Lugo. (Note: Ripe road still marks the boundary between the two cities in the modern era.)

They made an attempt to ambush the French troops, but Augereau, seasoned by his command in the War in the Vendée, spotted them before his troops were within musket range. Smugglers from Castel Bolognese (Note: Castel Bolognese had been a part of the Legation of Bologna, along with Ravenna, for centuries. Smuggling proliferated, in particular the salt trade.) who were familiar with the terrain had provided information to Augereau so that the French were able to rout the insurgents and strike from the rear. The garrison scattered, leaving the road to Lugo unprotected.

When Augereau came in sight of Lugo, he ordered the artillery battalion to begin shelling Lugo. (Note: The battalion had two pieces of artillery: an eight-pound field gun and a six-inch howitzer.) The bombardment began at 10 AM. The residents of Lugo were only accustomed to the sound of muskets, and the noise of the cannon blasts caused the units defending the Santerno to disperse. Mongardini, the leader of the revolt, escaped into the countryside on horseback, leaving only a few determined rebels to defend the city gates. Continued French artillery fire knocked down the Santa Maria Gate (Note: The southern gate of Lugo, also known as the Faenza Gate, which led into the modern-day Corso Garibaldi.) and the French troops entered Lugo. Only a few snipers remained to defend the city, most of its inhabitants having fled in terror of the cannon fire. French soldiers occupied the Santa Maria Gate as the San Bartolomeo Gate burned.

Lugo had been captured by the French by 11 AM. Augereau gave the order to his men to plunder the town. The soldiers carried everything they could, defacing and destroying anything they could not:

Buildings were looted, devastated, and left littered with piles of shattered furniture; shops stocked with all manner of goods were literally emptied; the poor inhabitants were, with ferocious cruelty, stripped of the little they possessed. No house, no place remained immune to the violence of the soldiery.

The French carried the bust of Saint Hilary away in a sack after toppling it from the altar, with only the relics left behind. The monte di Pietà was looted for a total sum of 40,000 scudi, including cash, gold, and silver. A sum of 20,000 scudi, comprising both cash and valuables, that had been collected for the war levy and kept at Trisi College was seized. The soldiers looted every public coffer and took large sums of private property as well. This included the Jewish ghetto, which was thoroughly plundered.

Churches were desecrated, and even convents, religious retreats, and hospices were not spared the actions of the French soldiers.

=== 8 July ===
The looting continued overnight. The French troops received orders to leave Lugo at 8 AM. They traveled to Castel Bolognese, then Faenza, before returning to Imola, arriving at 5 PM.

=== 9 July ===
The French sold the spoils in Bologna, with estimates showing a total of 300,000 scudi taken from Lugo. Seventeen insurgents were killed on 6 July at Santerno, with approximately twenty more dying on the riverbank on 7 July. A further six died in the sacking of Lugo, bringing the total number of fatalities to forty-three.

The French sustained approximately forty fatal casualties.

== Public devotion resumes ==
In February 1797, the Jacobins erected the Tree of Liberty in the square of the Church of the Carmine. In May 1799, the French were defeated by the Second Coalition, led by the Austrians. On 11 May, the people of Lugo drove out the French and burned the Tree. At the end of the day, grand festivities were organized, culminating with a torchlight procession that illuminated the city. The French Army's response was once again swift: General Hulin led a battalion into the city the following day, quelling the uprising and executing several dozen people.

=== Hilary of Galeata ===
Following the Conservative Order in 1815, the procession of Hilary of Galeata returned to being the principal festival of Lugo. In the absence of the original bust, the celebration took place with a silver-plated wooden bust, similar to its predecessor. On 15 May 1817 (a date deliberately chosen), Pope Pius VII issued a decree declaring Lugo a city. In 1848, at the request of the Bishop of Imola, the Carmelite Fathers — who had custody of the saint's bust at the Church of the Carmine — began participating in the procession.

The tradition was interrupted once more in 1871 when the Kingdom of Italy banned processions throughout the peninsula. Not until 1922 did the public celebrations honouring the Patron Saint resume.

In 1958, the 14^{th} centenary of the Saint's death, the Carmelites proposed raising funds to commission a new bust made entirely of silver. The Camorani family, who had long been devoted to Hilary of Galeata, intervened to cover the cost. The finalized bust stands 85 cm (33 in) tall and weighs more than 30 kg (66 lb). It is adorned with gilded chasing and has inset stones. The procession was revived in 1961 with the bust being carried each year on the feast day.

=== Madonna del Molino ===
Per tradition, the procession of the statue of Saint Hilary of Galeata travelled to the Marian sanctuary approximately 1 km (0.62 mi) west of the city. The sacred image of the Madonna, known as "del Molino", the patroness of Lugo, is venerated here. The French banned the rite in 1802.

After the Restoration, the image returned to the city and remained there until the end of the Holy See's rule in Romagna.

With Italy unified, the image was banned from being carried through the streets. The ban was lifted in 1874 due in part to the efforts of Father Carlo Cavina. Since then, the Madonna's image has entered the city regularly during Rogation days.

== Bibliography ==
- Lazzari, Alfonso (1906). La sommossa e il sacco di Lugo (1796) [The Uprising and Sacking of Lugo (1796)] (in Italian). Ferrara: Tipografia sociale – via Google Books.
- Lumbroso, Giacomo (1932). I moti popolari contro i francesi alla fine del secolo XVIII (1796-1800) [Popular uprisings against the French at the end of the 18th century (1796-1800)] (in Italian). Milano: Maurizio Minchella editore.
- Rambelli, Gianfrancesco (1839). Cenno storico del moto e saccheggiamento di Lugo nel 1796 [The history of the uprising and sacking of Lugo in 1796] (in Italian). Bologna: Bibliot Banclerici – via Google Books.
- Sanguinetti, Oscar, ed. (2001). Insorgenze anti-giacobine in Italia (1796-1799) Saggi per un bicentenario [Anti-Jacobin Uprisings in Italy (1796-1799) Essays for a bicentennial] (in Italian). Milano: Istituto per la Storia delle Insorgenze. ISBN 978-8890035814.
