= Bagnara =

Bagnara may refer to:

- Bagnara (surname), list of people with the surname
- Bagnara Calabra, comune in the Province of Reggio Calabria in Calabria, southern Italy
- Bagnara di Romagna, comune in the Province of Ravenna in Emilia-Romagna, Italy

== See also ==
- Bagnaria
- Bagnaia (disambiguation)
