= Barbiano =

Barbiano may refer to:

- Barbian, village in South Tyrol
- Barbiano di Cotignola, parish in the province of Ravenna
- Barbiano di Belgioioso, Lombard noble family
