= Ludovico Barbiano di Belgiojoso (1488–1530) =

Italian military leader (1488–1530)

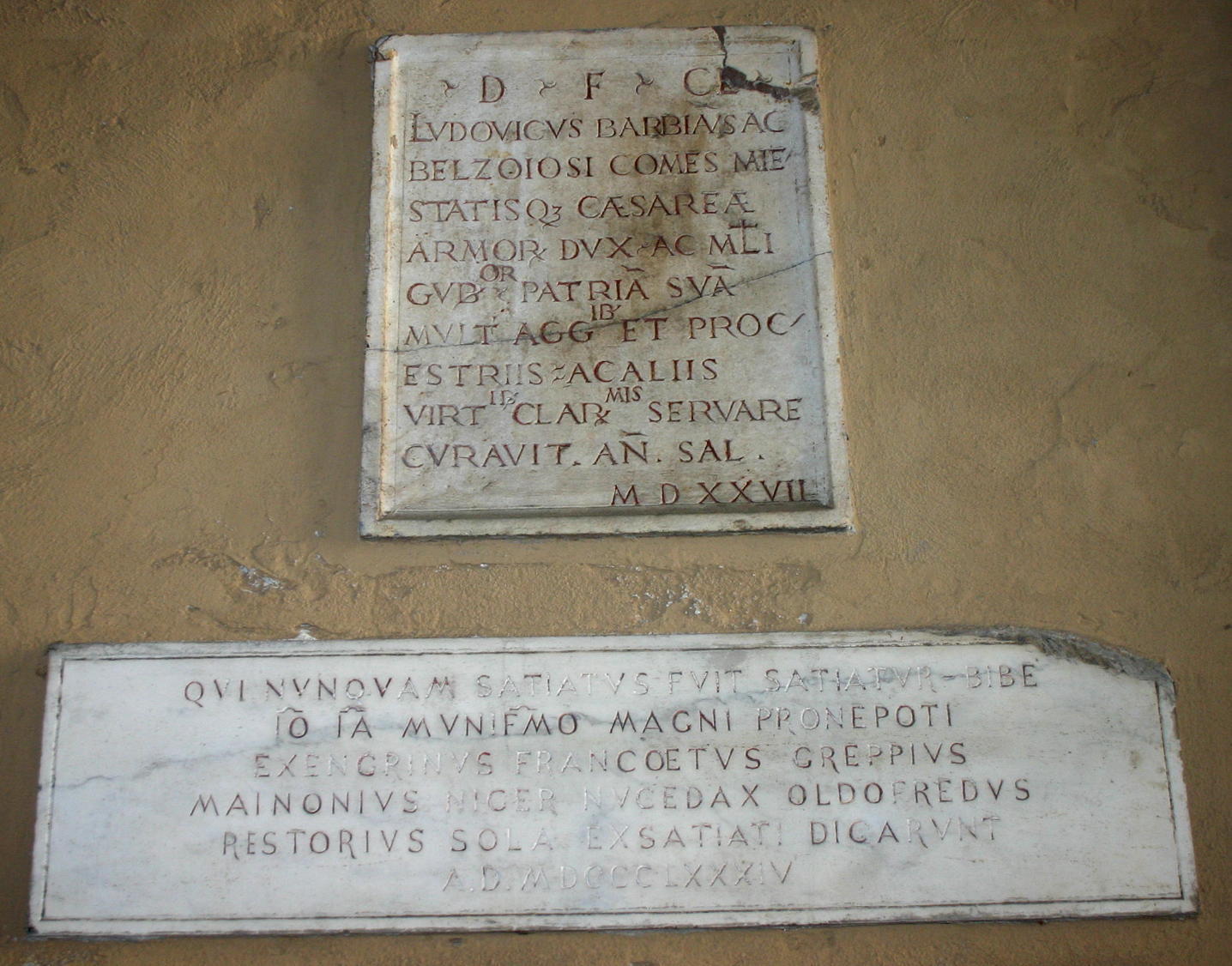
Plaque (top) in honour of Belgiojoso at the Palazzo Trivulzio

Ludovico Barbiano di Belgiojoso (1488–1530) was an Italian military leader who fought on both sides during the Italian Wars.

== Career ==
=== French service ===
Belgiojoso was born on 15 March 1488 to Carlo Barbiano di Belgiojoso and Caterina Visconti. His military career began at an early age under the condottiero Gian Giacomo Trivulzio. He fought at the battle of Ravenna (1512) and the battle of Marignano (1515). Afterwards he moved to France, where he became a chamberlain to Francis I and castellan of Rouvres.

In 1521, Belgiojoso fought in the French invasion of Navarre as part of the Italian contingent under Teodoro Trivulzio. In 1522, he took part in the French invasion of Italy. In June, he was sent on a diplomatic mission to the Republic of Venice to refuse a truce with the Holy Roman Empire. With Giovanni Cavazzi della Somaglia, he commanded the fortress of Lodi. He fought in the Italian campaign of 1524–1525 and was present at the battles of Robecco, the Sesia and Pavia. After retreating to France, he was sent with Italian troops to defend Picardy.

In 1526, Belgiojoso was challenged to a duel by the Venetian condottiero Alvise Gonzaga. The intervention of Pope Clement VII, the Marquis Ferderico II of Mantua, the Republic of Venice and Duke Alfonso I of Ferrara hastened an amicable settlement. Around the same time, Belgiojoso offered his services to Venice, but no agreement on operations could be reached. In August, he was at Amboise seeking guarantees of his Italian properties from Francis I.

=== Imperial service ===
On 10 September 1526, by agreement with the Emperor Charles V, Belgiojoso returned to Italy. His properties at Lugo and Belgioioso were restored. On 12 November, Francis I ordered Philippe Chabot to confiscate the castellany of Rouvres. In compensation, Belgiojoso received the fief of Castel San Giovanni and the castle and county of Monza in January 1527, further lands in April–May 1528, the castle of Cotignola in October 1528 and the castle of San Colombano in April 1529.

In January 1527, Belgiojoso was defending the approach to Milan against the League of Cognac with 5,000 native troops and some Spaniards. These were a ragtag bunch which the chronicler Giovan Marco Burigozzo described as doing more harm to property and the honour of women than the Spanish or Turks. He clashed with the imperial governor of Milan, Antonio de Leyva, who distrusted him. He was charged with the defence of Pavia against the Viscount of Lautrec. He had at his disposal some 2,000 Italian infantry, 30 men-at-arms and 100 light cavalry. On 4–5 October, after an artillery bombardment had levelled what was left of the walls, he surrendered the city. Although his troops had put up a stout resistance, Belgiojoso was widely blamed for the ensuing sack of the city.

A prisoner of war, Belgiojoso was held in Genoa until February 1528, when he was released to Milan on the payment of a ransom. He was immediately given command of some Italian infantry and German Landsknechte. On 13 May, he retook Pavia with Milanese troops. (It was recovered for the League by Venetian troops on 19 September, but by then the League's position in Lombardy was doomed.) Charged with work on the castle and walls of Milan, Belgiojoso entrusted the task to the architect Cesare Cesariano. In 1529, he secured a contribution of 120,000 ducats from the Republic of Genoa in return for the defence of the city against the French. On behalf of Leyva and Lope de Soria, he recruited soldiers in Piacenza, Corsica and Genoa for the defence of Milan.

In September 1529, Charles V appointed Belgiojoso captain general of the Spanish infantry in Lombardy. When Leyva was called away in October to help in negotiations with the Papal State, Belgiojoso was left as acting governor of the Duchy of Milan. He intrigued to prevent the restoration of Duke Francesco II Sforza and perhaps even to be appointed duke himself. He died suddenly in January 1530. There were rumours of poison. His heirs were the sons of his brother Pierfrancesco. He also left 1,000 scudi to an illegitimate daughter. The fiefs he had been granted escheated.

== Bibliography ==
- Ghisalberti, Alberto Maria [in Italian], ed. (1964). "Barbiano di Belgioioso, Ludovico". Dizionario Biografico degli Italiani. Vol. 6: Baratteri–Bartolozzi. Istituto dell'Enciclopedia Italiana.
- Mallett, Michael; Shaw, Christine (2012). The Italian Wars, 1494–1559: War, State and Society in Early Modern Europe. Pearson.
- Setton, Kenneth Meyer (1984). The Papacy and the Levant, 1204–1571. Vol. III: The Sixteenth Century to the Reign of Julius III. American Philosophical Society.
- Téllez Calvín, Gabriel (2019). "La asistencia militar de los nobles lombardos a Carlos V en la defensa del Estado de Milán (1525–1530)". In Elena María García Guerra; Héctor Linares González; Marina Perruca Gracia (eds.). De la nobleza y la caballería: Privilegio poder y servicio en la articulación de la sociedad moderna, ss. XVI–XVII. New Digital Frontiers. pp. 247–257.
