= Bagnara (surname) =

Bagnara is an Italian toponymic surname and refers to those from Bagnara Calabra in Calabria, Bagnara di Romagna in Emilia-Romagna and Bagnara in Piedmont. The word Bagnara was derived from the Latin term balnearia which means "bathing place".

Notable people with the surname include:

- Eros Bagnara (born 1985), Italian football player
- Francesco Bagnara (1784–1866), Italian scenographer, decorator and landscape architect
- Paolo Ruffo di Bagnara (1791–1865), Neapolitan diplomat and soldier
- Pietro di Bagnara (1511/1520–1590/1595), Italian monk and painter
