= Sack of Pavia (1527) =

1527 military action

- Part of War of the League of Cognac
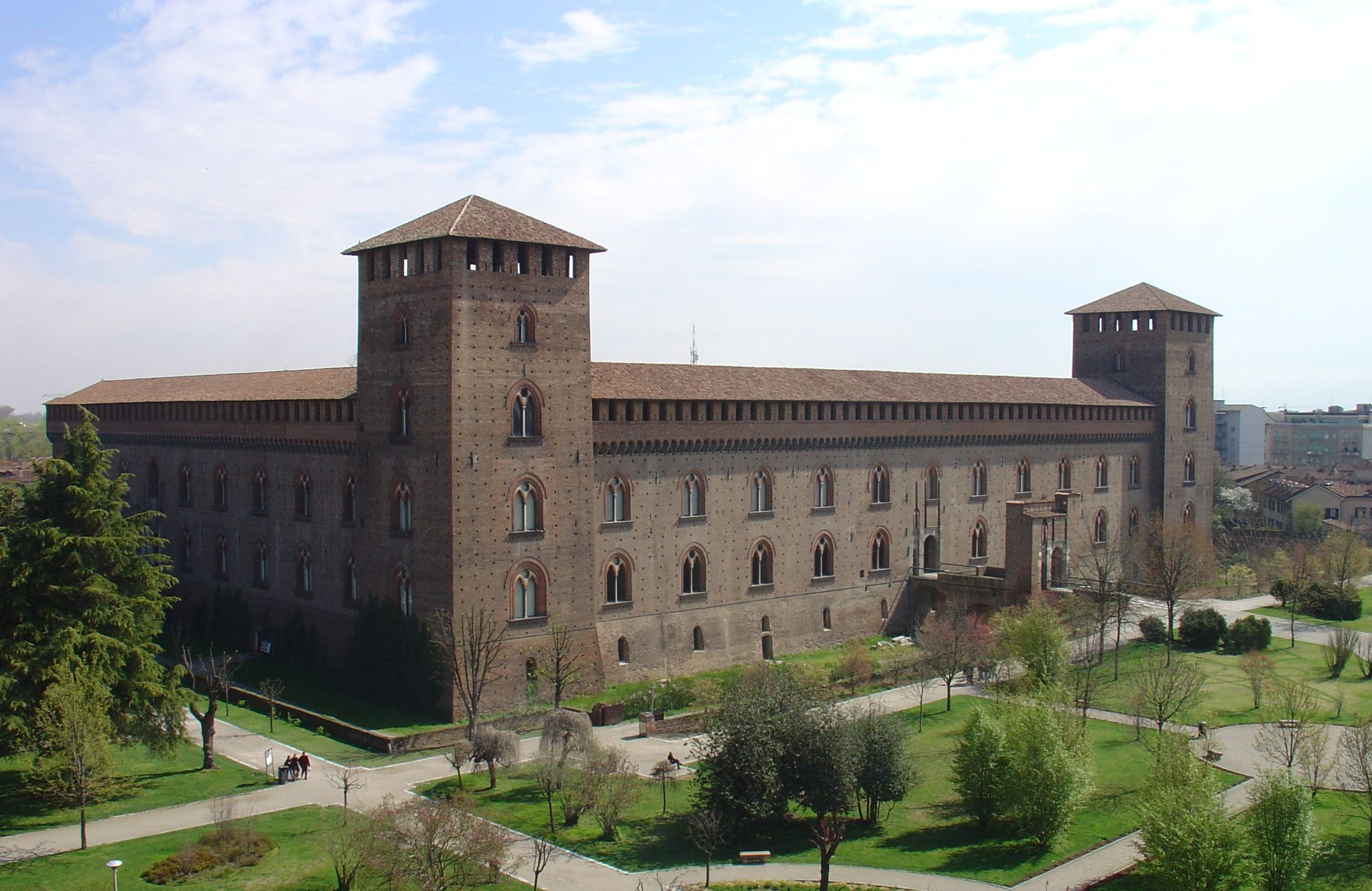
- The Visconti Castle of Pavia
Date	1–5 October (siege); 5–12 October 1527 (sack)
Location	Pavia, Duchy of Milan
Result	Franco–Venetian victory

Belligerents
Kingdom of France; Republic of Venice	Holy Roman Empire; Spanish Empire

Commanders and leaders
(Kingdom of France) Odet de Foix (Republic of Venice) Giano Campofregoso	Ludovico Barbiano di Belgiojoso

Strength
	2,130 infantry and cavalry

Casualties and losses
	15,000 civilians (reported)

The sack of Pavia took place in 1527 during the War of the League of Cognac. The city was defended on behalf of the Emperor Charles V by Count Ludovico Barbiano di Belgiojoso. He had 2,000 native Italian infantry, 30 men-at-arms and 100 light horse under his command. The city walls had not been repaired since the battle of Pavia in 1525.

The forces of the League consisted of a French army under Odet of Foix, Viscount of Lautrec; a Venetian army under Giano Campofregoso; and some Lombards under Duke Francesco Sforza of Milan. After capturing Alessandria on 12 September 1527, Lautrec joined up with his allies and marched on Pavia, bypassing the main imperial force under Antonio de Leyva at Milan. He encamped by the Pavian Charterhouse before the end of September.

Artillery bombarded the Visconti Castle, while the defenders resisted behind moats and a counterscarp. On 4–5 October, Belgiojoso agreed to surrender. Lautrec intended to prevent a sack, but his troops went on a rampage, avenging the capture of King Francis I at Pavia two years earlier. Marino Sanudo the Younger lamented in his diary the sight of "girls being carried away by Gascons and the Swiss." According to some reports, 15,000 persons were killed and 200 houses burned in the sack.

== Bibliography ==
- Mallett, Michael; Shaw, Christine (2012). The Italian Wars, 1494–1559: War, State and Society in Early Modern Europe. Pearson.
- Setton, Kenneth Meyer (1984). The Papacy and the Levant, 1204–1571. Vol. III: The Sixteenth Century to the Reign of Julius III. American Philosophical Society.
