= Pietro di Bagnara =

16th-century Italian painter

Pietro di Bagnara or Pietro Bagnara Bacchi (1511/1520, Bagnara - 1590/1595, Imola) was an Italian monk and painter. He was born in Bagnara and studied painting is Bologna.

He is styled as a follower of Raphael, mainly by virtue of his use of colors. He was a member of the Augustinian order of Canons Regular of the Lateran. He lived in the monastery attached to the Basilica of Santa Maria in Porto at Ravenna, where circa 1550 he painted a St. Sebastian, and a St Lawrence altarpiece for a chapel, a large canvas of the multiplication of the bread in the refectory and beautiful arabesques with a crucifixion in the ceiling of said refectory. In 1537 at Verdara, for the church of San Giovanni, he painted a Madonna with Saints Augustine and John the Baptist. The background has a landscape and holy conversation. In 1579, for the Church of Santa Maria della Passione in Milan, he painted a Jesus on the road to Calvary (Andata al Calvario). The Museum of Padua has two canvases, originally found in the church of San Giovanni di Verdara, painted by Bagnara: a Visitation (1537) and a Madonna. He signed his work with "Orate Deum pro anima huyus [sic] pictoris" ("Pray God for the soul of this painter").
