= Ludovico Barbiano di Belgiojoso =

Ludovico Barbiano di Belgiojoso (also spelled Lodovico, Belgioioso) may refer to:

- Ludovico Barbiano di Belgiojoso (1488–1530), Italian aristocrat and mercenary captain
- Ludovico Barbiano di Belgiojoso (1728–1801), Austrian diplomat and general
- Lodovico Barbiano di Belgiojoso (1909–2004), Italian architect and designer, member of BBPR group (see also Stolpersteine in Milan)

== See also ==
- Luigi Barbiano di Belgioioso
