= Barbiano di Belgioioso =

Coat of arms

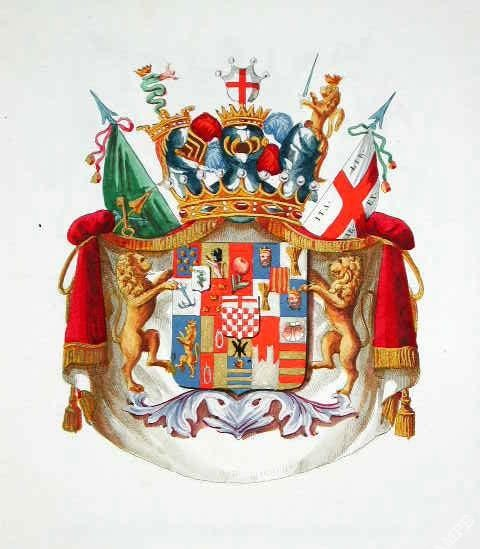
Coat of arms of the Princes Barbiano di Belgioioso-Este.

The Barbiano di Belgioioso (originally Da Barbiano) have been a noble family of northern Italy since the late Middle Ages.

Originally Romagnol, the family can be traced back to Alidosio, count of Cunio and of Barbiano in the 14th century. His son, Alberico da Barbiano, was a prominent early condottiero whose nephew, Alberico II, received the Belgioioso Castle from Duke Filippo Maria Visconti of Milan in 1431. The family was always most famous for its soldiering, rarely rising high in political or ecclesiastical rank. Only in later centuries did some members adopt an interest in arts and letters.

In 1769 the most important branch of the family received the title of Prince of the Holy Roman Empire and the surname of Barbiano di Belgioioso-Este after the marriage with the heiress of a branch of the House of Este (Anna Ricciarda, daughter of Carlo Filiberto II d'Este).

== Prominent members ==
- Giovanni da Barbiano (died 1399), condottiero
- Alberico da Barbiano (died 1409), condottiero
- Lodovico da Barbiano (died 1423), condottiero
- Manfredo da Barbiano (died 1430), condottiero
- Alberico II da Barbiano (died 1440)
- Carlo Barbiano di Belgiojoso (1459/9–1514)
- Ludovico Barbiano di Belgiojoso (1488–1530), Italian aristocrat and mercenary captain
- Pierfrancesco Barbiano di Belgiojoso (1489–1546)
- Giovan Giacomo Barbiano di Belgioioso (1565–1626), military commander in Habsburg service
- Giovanni Barbiano di Belgiojoso (1638–1715)
- Antonio Barbiano di Belgiojoso (1693–1779), soldier
- Alberico Barbiano di Belgiojoso (1725–1813), writer and soldier
- Ludovico Barbiano di Belgiojoso (1728–1801), Austrian diplomat and general
- Antonia Barbiano di Belgiojoso (1730–1773), writer
- Luigi Barbiano di Belgioioso (1803–1885), Italian politician
- Cristina Trivulzio Belgiojoso (1808–1871), Princess of Belgioioso
- Carlo Barbiano di Belgiojoso (1815–1881), politician
- Emilio Barbiano di Belgiojoso-Este (1855–1944)
- Lodovico Barbiano di Belgiojoso (1909–2004), Italian architect and designer

== See also ==
- Belgioioso, Lombardy, a town in Lombardy, Italy
- Palazzo Belgioioso, a palace in Milan
- Villa Belgiojoso Bonaparte, a palace in Milan
- Belgioioso Castle, a castle in Lombardy
