= Belgioioso Castle =

Castle in Belgioioso, Lombardy, Italy

- Belgioioso, Italy
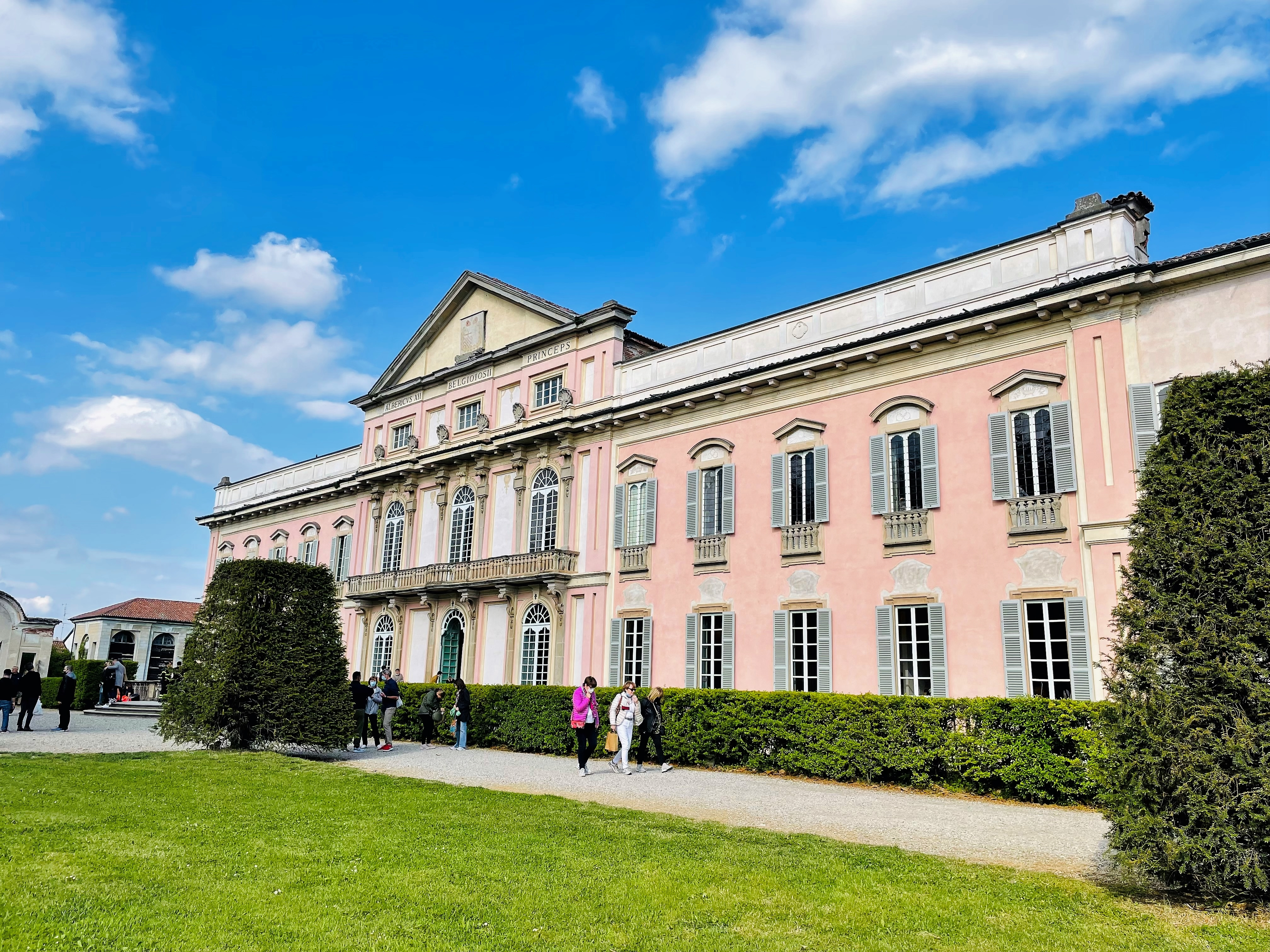
- Status The west facade of the castle

Site information
- Type: Medieval Castle

Location
- Coordinates: 45°09′37″N 9°18′47″E

Site history
- Built: 14th century

Belgioioso Castle is a monument located in Belgioioso, a few kilometers from Pavia.

== History ==
=== Origins ===
In 1376, Galeazzo II Visconti, co-lord of Milan and lord of Pavia, purchased from Lanterio de Cazabove of Pavia a castle, equipped with a tower and ricetto, in Belgioioso.

The present castle was probably rebuilt by Galeazzo II in the second half of the 14th century in an extensive Visconti property in the territory where the town of Belgioioso later arose. The name "Zoioso" was perhaps given to the castle because of the amenity of the place and the happiness that staying there must once have brought. The area where the castle was built was close to the Via Francigena and a large forest, which went (south of the castle) as far as the bank of the Po, near the Chiesa di San Giacomo della Cerreta della Cerreta and the important port of Pissarello, known in the Middle Ages as the "Porcaria valley" because of the large number of wild boar in the dense oak forests.

The new Visconti castle, conceived as a hunting lodge, echoes the ad quadratum layout (without the corner towers) and monumental dimensions (each side is about 100 meters long) of the castle in Pavia, the seat of the court of Galeazzo II and his son Gian Galeazzo.

Galeazzo II's son, Gian Galeazzo, lord and later duke of Milan, stayed there repeatedly; so dear to his heart was his home in Belgioioso that, in a letter from him dated December 22, 1393, he prohibited the hunting of deer and any other game as far as Bereguardo, Vigevano, and Abbiategrasso.

This measure is also mentioned in the famous testament of 1397, in which the Duke ordered that a Carthusian monastery, house, and church be built on the territory of Pavia "in loco Turris de Mangano"—the Carthusian monastery of Pavia—for the remedy and suffrage of his soul. However, the duke excluded from donations to the Carthusians the very large Visconti park at Pavia Castle and the castle estates of Bereguardo and Belgioioso.

[...] With the Torre dei Preti estate bordered another property Joiosus or Zoiosus; perhaps originally a center of cultivation, but later came into the possession of the Dukes of Milan, here attracted by the abundant game, transformed into fortifications, in the shape of a small castle, to which courtiers, poachers, hunters convened, following the Ducal Court Convennero from neighboring countries families to settle, and thus was formed the settlement numerous enough to supplant even S. James: Zoioso had its greatest development under Galeazzo II and Cian Galeazzo.

— P.GHIA

[...] from the castle of Belzoiosus on September 15, 1388, Gian Galeazzo warned the Podestà of Milan to allow wild boar hunting but to only with dogs and bore with snares [...] and by letter dated December 21, 1393, extended the prohibition to hunting deer and any game beyond the Ticino River, to Bereguardo, Belgioioso, Vigevano, and Abbiategrasso.

— C.MAGENTA

=== 15th century ===
It is not known exactly how large the castle was at that time. The manor is said to have been destroyed in 1412 and then rebuilt following the assassination of Duke Gian Maria Visconti, son of Gian Galeazzo and Caterina Barnabò, but this information is not confirmed in documents. His successor Filippo Maria did not like to stay in Belgioioso as his predecessors did because the Po River frequently overflowed. In 1412, he ceded it as a fief to Manfredo Beccaria (I° infeudazione). However, that lineage rebelled, and the property was confiscated and entrusted to other Visconti.

In 1431, Filippo Maria, not very satisfied with the way things were going, granted the "castrum" to Alberico da Barbiano (2nd enfeoffment). Later the predicate of Belgioioso was added to the name of that household, which was then the seat of a Vicariate of considerable size that included the parishes of Vaccarizza, Ospitaletto, Genzone, Pissarello, Spessa, Filighera, Montesano, Torre de' Negri, Gerenzago and San Zenone. A confirmation of this investiture came from Francesco Sforza.

=== The Counts of Barbian ===
The very ancient stock of the counts of Cunio and Barbiano (recalled by Dante in c. XIV of Purgatorio) was known and powerful in Romagna since the 11th century. It possessed the comital title of the imperial fiefs of Cunio (1241), Barbiano, Lugo, Zagonara, Bagnacavallo, Fusignano, and Donigallia. Among the various counts of Barbiano, the most famous is certainly Alberic the Great. Wealthy, powerful, lord of vast fiefdoms, of a battler's spirit, ardent, ambitious, he formed a company of fortune of 200 lances and participated, among other exploits, in the siege and destruction of Cesena (it seems, however, that he deplored this fratricidal war). He later moved to Lombardy in the services of the Visconti.

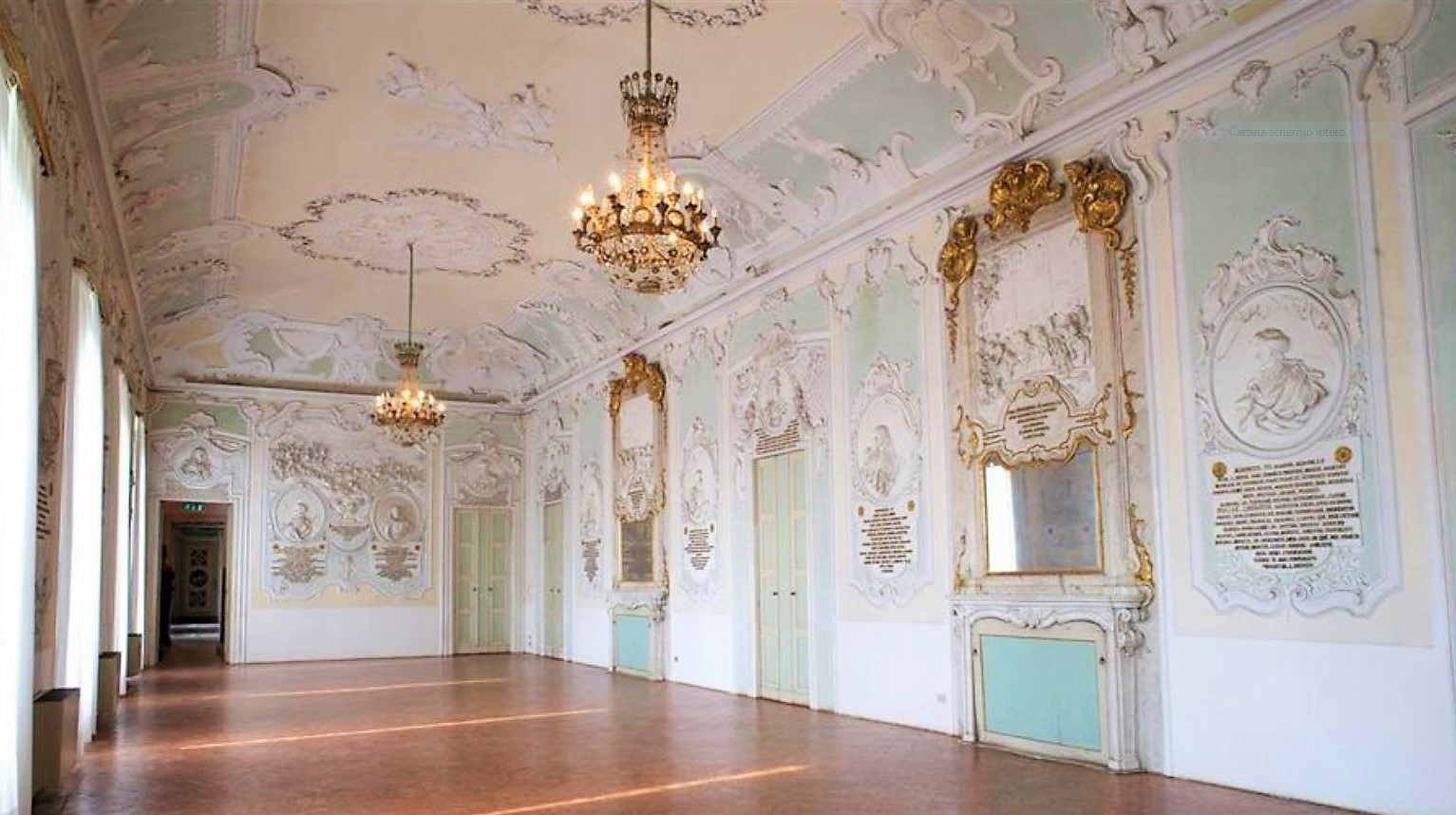
Carlo Beretta, the Hall of the Ancestors, 1740- 1760.

In the meantime, the company had grown, and had been christened "Company of St. George"; it comprised 800 chosen lances. No foreigners, however, were a part of it, for Alberic, a broad-minded leader, expert in the military art, and who very well knew the souls of mercenaries, never wanted to accept Italians to serve under his banner. Indeed, it is well known that the Belgioioso's motto: "Italia ab esteris liberata" goes back, to his fame as the rebuilder of the Italian Militia, at a time when the Malatesta, Farnese, Ubaldini, Luchino Dal Verme and other Italian lords had formed companies of fortune, unhappily welcoming into them even the worst part of the English lances and Germanic beardsmen.

=== 17th century ===
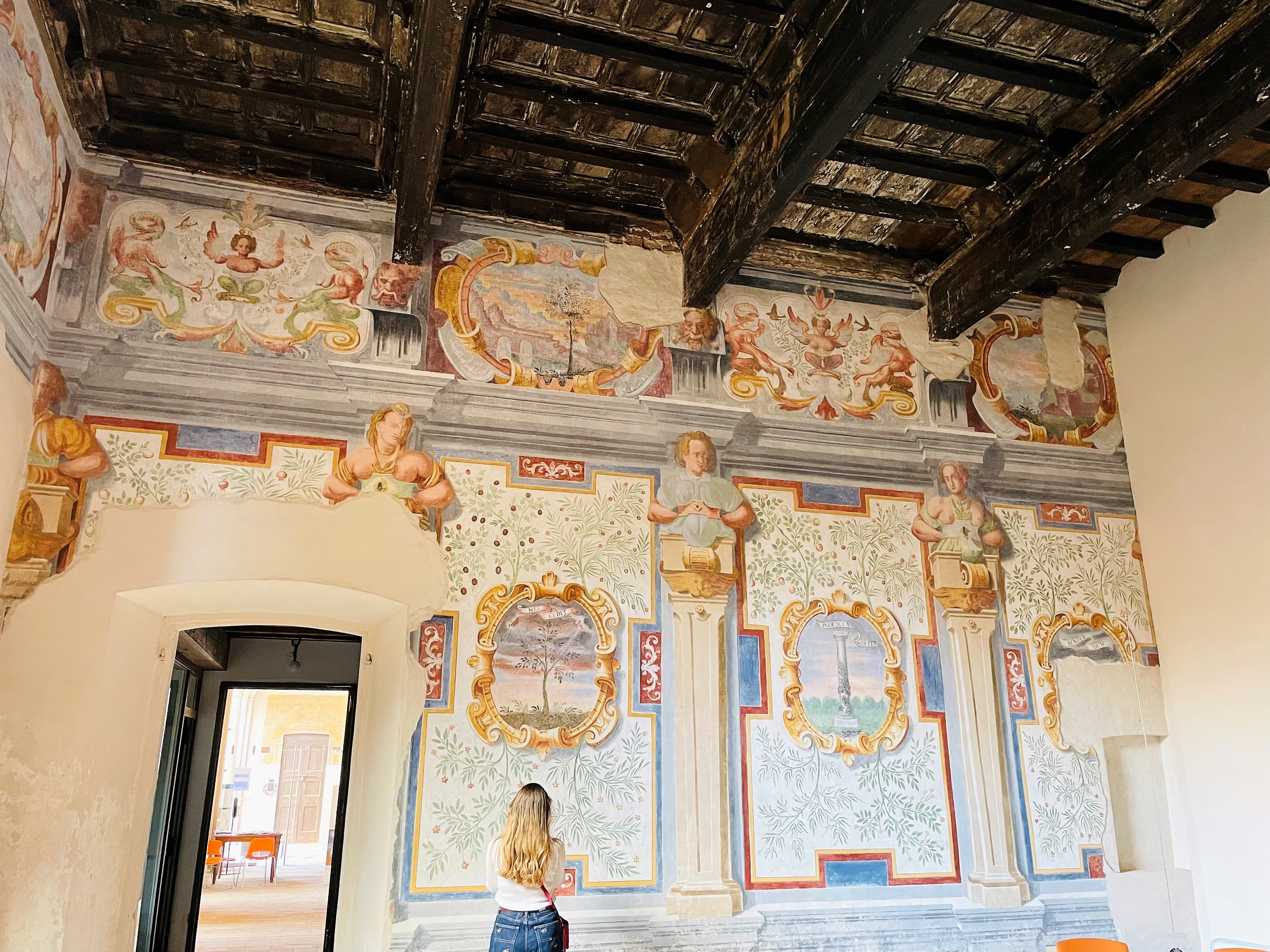
Hall of Enterprises, late 16th century.

In the seventeenth century, the nobility, subject to Spanish rule, devoted themselves to a life of luxury, softness, and violence. Even the Dukes of Belgioioso were not exempt from the sad trend of the times. The terrible plague of 1630 did not spare the territory and its people, who experienced untold suffering due to the devastating scourge and the embezzlement of overbearing soldiers.

=== 18th and 19th centuries ===
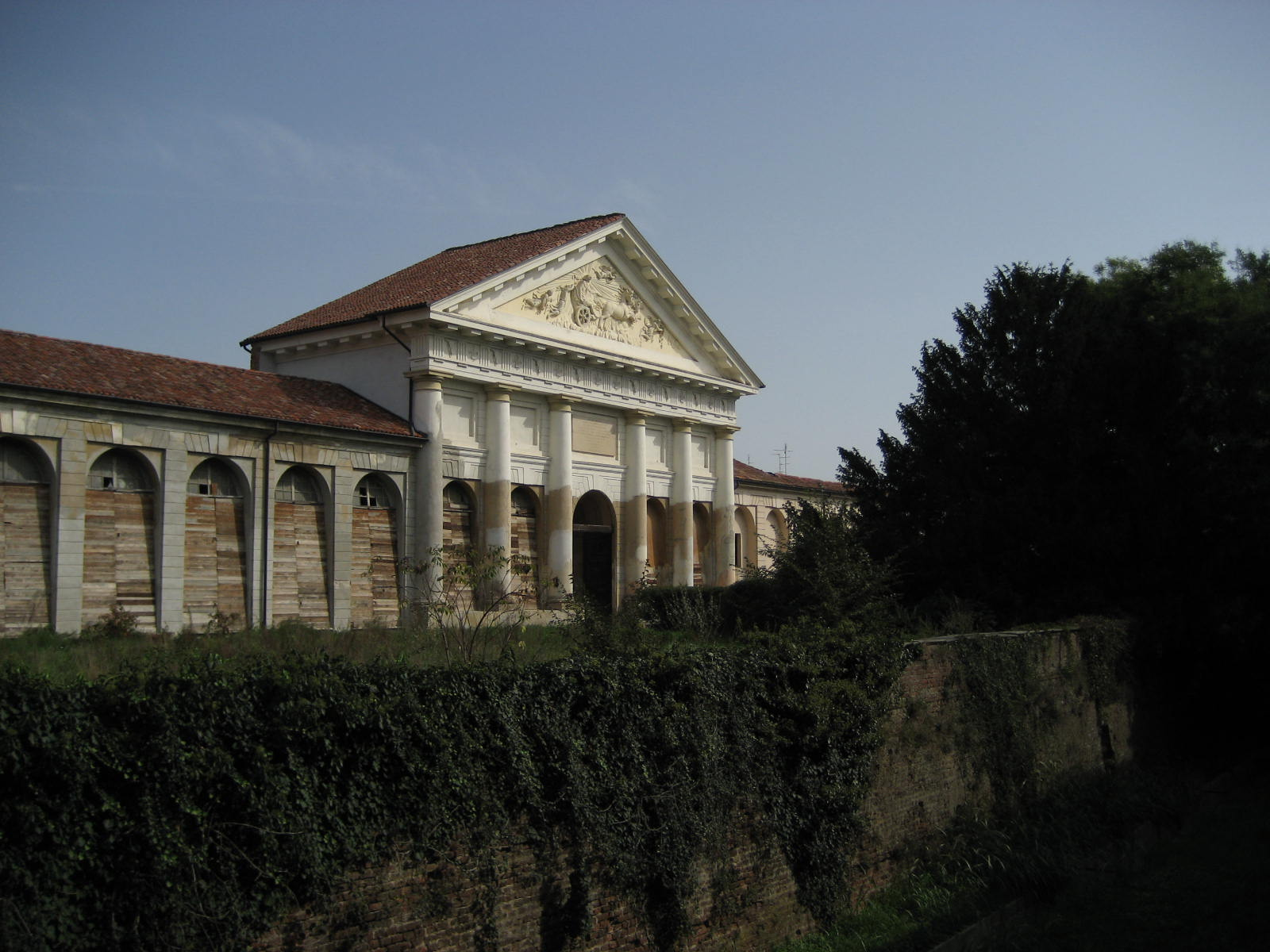
Leopold Pollack, the greenhouses and stables of the castle, 1792.

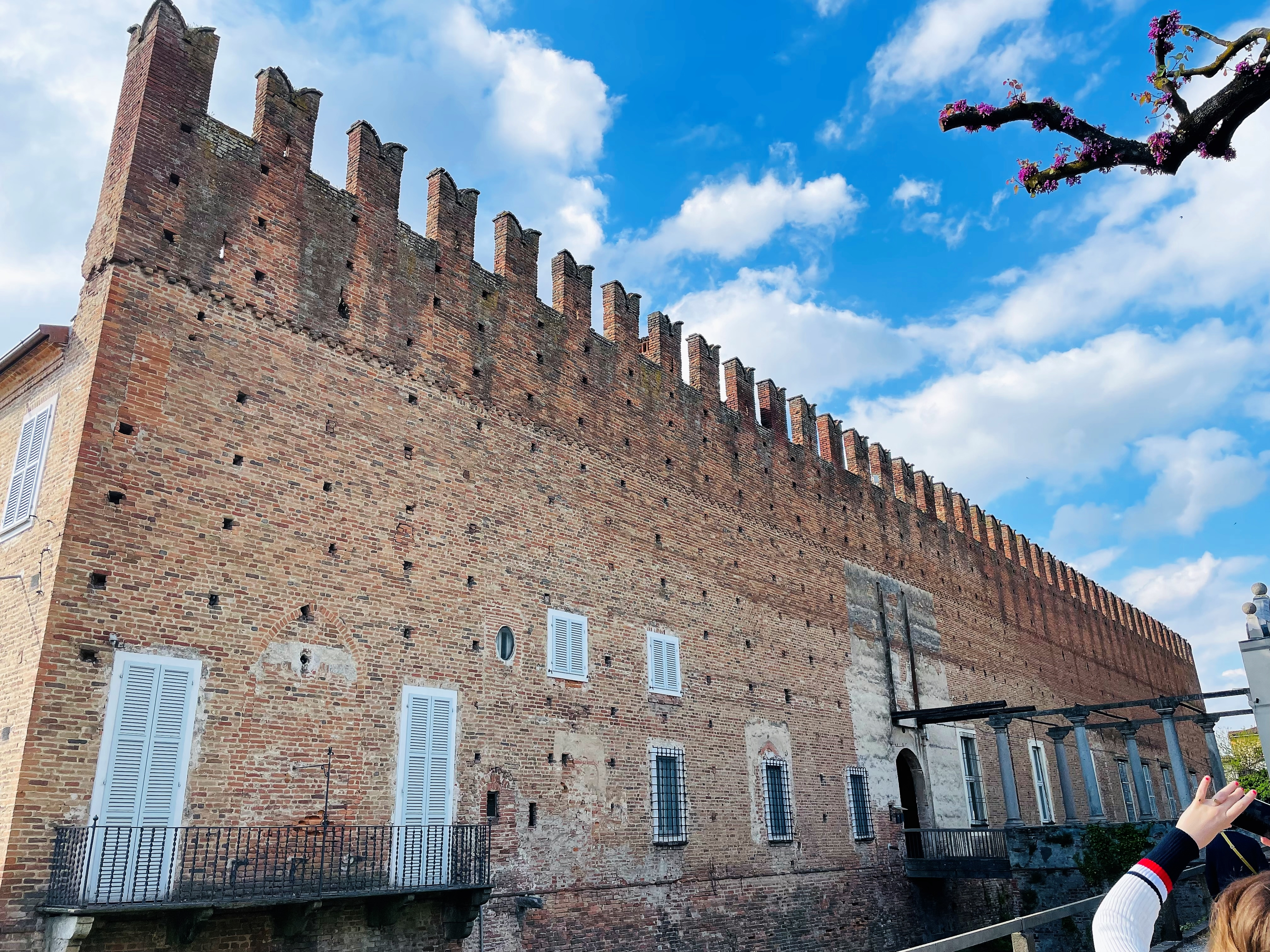
The east side of the castle with the 14th-century battlements.

In the eighteenth century, the castle rose to a festive and brilliant life through the work of another prince, Alberico. Vidari, recalls the superb festivities given in honor of the Infante of Spain in 1783 and in honor of Eugène de Beauharnais when he came to Italy as viceroy. Also in this century the castle was enlarged and rebuilt. Don Antonio Barbiano had the beautiful gate built and embellished almost the entire palace by renovating the vast gardens and greenhouses. In 1769 he was named prince of the Holy Roman Empire and of Belgioioso, a title transmissible to first-born males with various privileges, including that of minting the so-called "ostentation coin"" with his effigy.

His son Alberic XII was a talented, art-loving man. He had works executed under the direction of Pollak. He was generous and hospitable, his friendships included Parini and Foscolo who were guests at the castle. He undertook reclamation works, established schools for the settlers' children, and worked to improve the lives of the population. He was devoted to the Court without being a slave to it; he deplored the fact that the government in Vienna did not give government posts to Italians. He participated in the Seven Years' War and resided at the French court. He was opposed to the French Revolution and the new regime and spent the last years of his life in solitude. He had to suffer the shame of the destruction of his coats of arms and noble arms by order of the French government. During this voluntary exile, he had Parini and Foscolo as guests, and under the latter's eyes, he died on August 17, 1813. To his eldest son came the title of prince and the castle of San Colombano; to the cadet branch the estates of Belgioioso and the title of count.

In the second half of the 19th century, the castle passed by inheritance to the Melzi d'Eril family. In the 1970s the western part and the large park of the castle were acquired by a group of private individuals and are now mainly used for fairs and cultural events, while the eastern wing of the complex was purchased by the municipality of Belgioioso between 2007 and 2008.

== Description ==
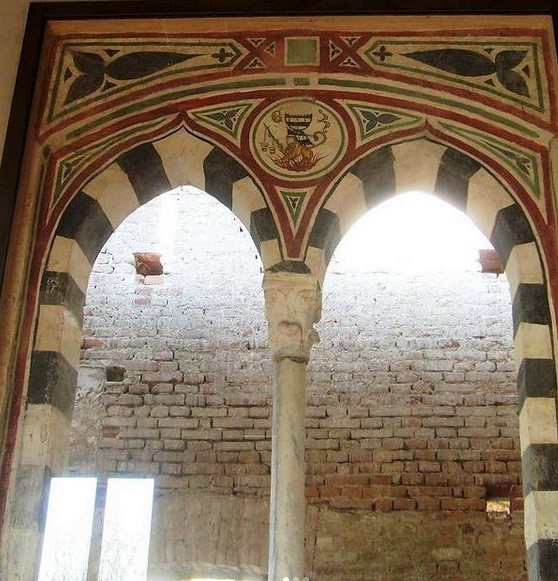
Bifora with the feat of Galeazzo II Visconti, second half of the 14th century.

Like many other castles in Lombardy, that of Belgioioso has a quadrangular layout, surrounded by a wide moat. The complex has three inner courtyards, differing (due to renovations and adaptations to stylistic dictates over the centuries) in physiognomy. The eastern façade, facing Vittorio Veneto Square, retains the tall original 14th-century elevation, set on a scarp base and completely in exposed brickwork, provided with a drawbridge and fitted with Ghibelline battlements (embellished with a decorative band of bricks arranged in denticles), which also extends over much of the castle's north-facing façade. The west-facing facade, on the other hand, open to the large Italian garden, was remodeled in the second half of the 18th century in the Neoclassical style.

In the eastern part of the castle, which has most maintained the appearance of the medieval fortress, a stone staircase dating back to the 18th century is preserved, while restorations undertaken after 2008 have returned a 14th-century mullioned window entirely painted with a blue-and-white lozenge motif and the coat of arms of Galeazzo II Visconti, and traces of the same decoration have also emerged in some rooms leaning against the castle's eastern façade. Other rooms in this wing of the castle, on the other hand, are decorated with telamons and heraldic devices of the Barbiano di Belgioioso family dating from the late 16th century. Also in the eastern part of the castle, during restorations in 2014, the remains of a two-story tower, also dating from the 14th century, were identified and later incorporated inside the building.

The west wing of the castle, in neoclassical style and dominated by a large balcony, was rebuilt by Prince Antonio Barbiano di Belgioioso, who entrusted the work to Francesco Croce. On this side of the castle are the noble rooms of the manor, connected by a grand stone staircase, on the walls of which hang tapestries, flags, and weapons bearing the coat of arms of the princes. Also on the second floor is the large ballroom (measuring 13 x 13 meters), which is entirely frescoed according to a decorative program designed by Leopoldo Pollack, and the gallery of the ancestors, enriched by white marble fireplaces and Baroque stuccoes made between 1740 and 1760 by Carlo Beretta in which are depicted the busts of 19 members of the lineage and the exploits they conducted described with inscriptions in pure gold.

To the north of the castle are the greenhouses and stables, whose façade echoes the forms of an ancient temple, designed by Leopold Pollack in 1792. The castle wing opens onto the large Italian garden, remodeled in the same years again by Prince Antonio, featuring seven rows of giant magnolias, statues, small stone obelisks, and the monumental fountain with Neptune and Thetis surrounded by nymphs, an 18th-century work by Carlo Beretta. The garden ends to the west with a large gate, with six tall pillars surmounted by statues, nymphs, putti, and vases (all by Carlo Beretta), called the "Teatro de Rastelli", designed by Giovanni and Ruggeri and finished by Francesco Croce in 1737. On the faces of the main pillars of the gate is repeated several times the initials of Prince Anthony, surmounted by the prince's crown.

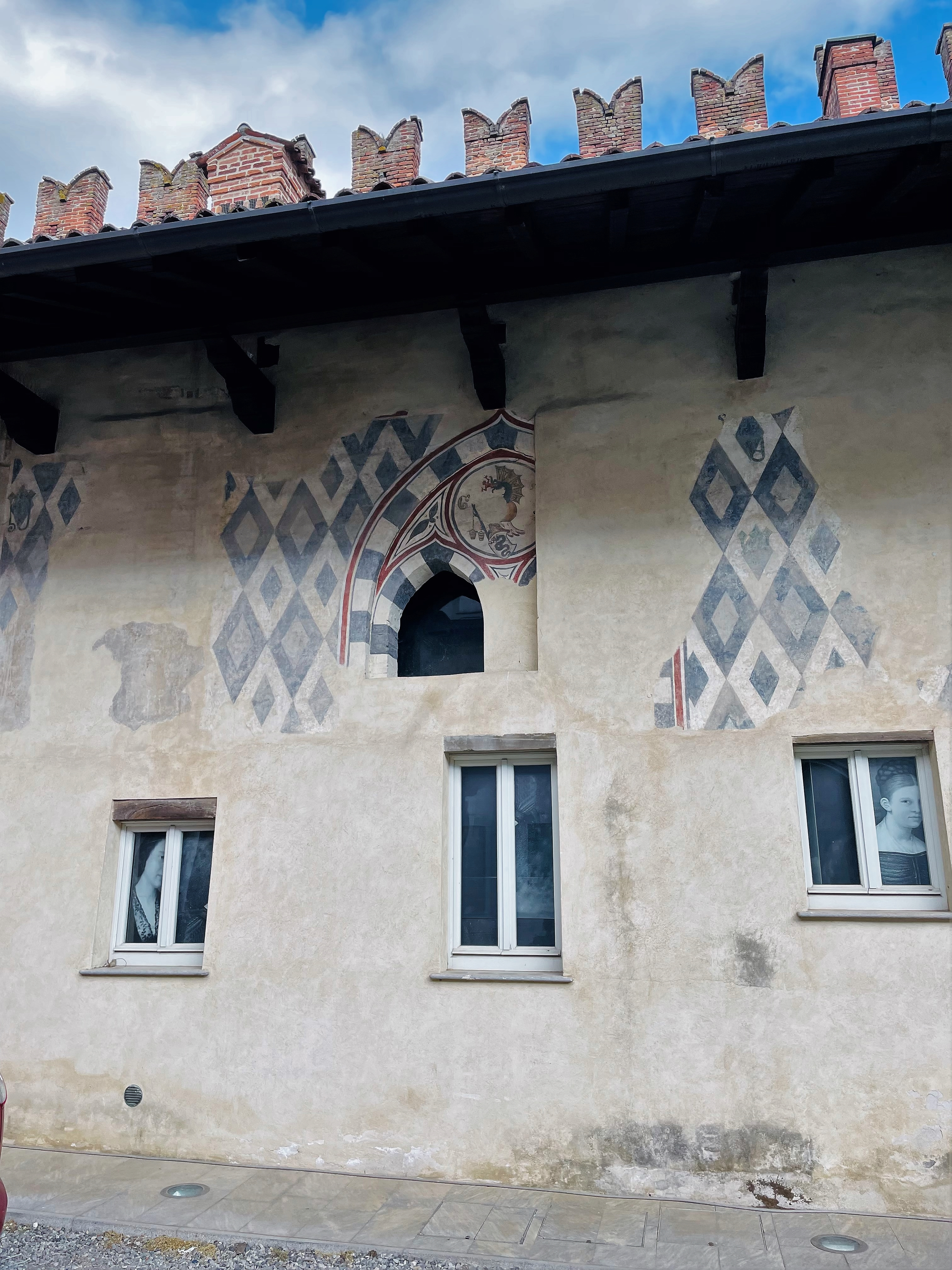
Part of the lozenge decoration of the rooms in the east wing of the castle, second half of the 14th century.

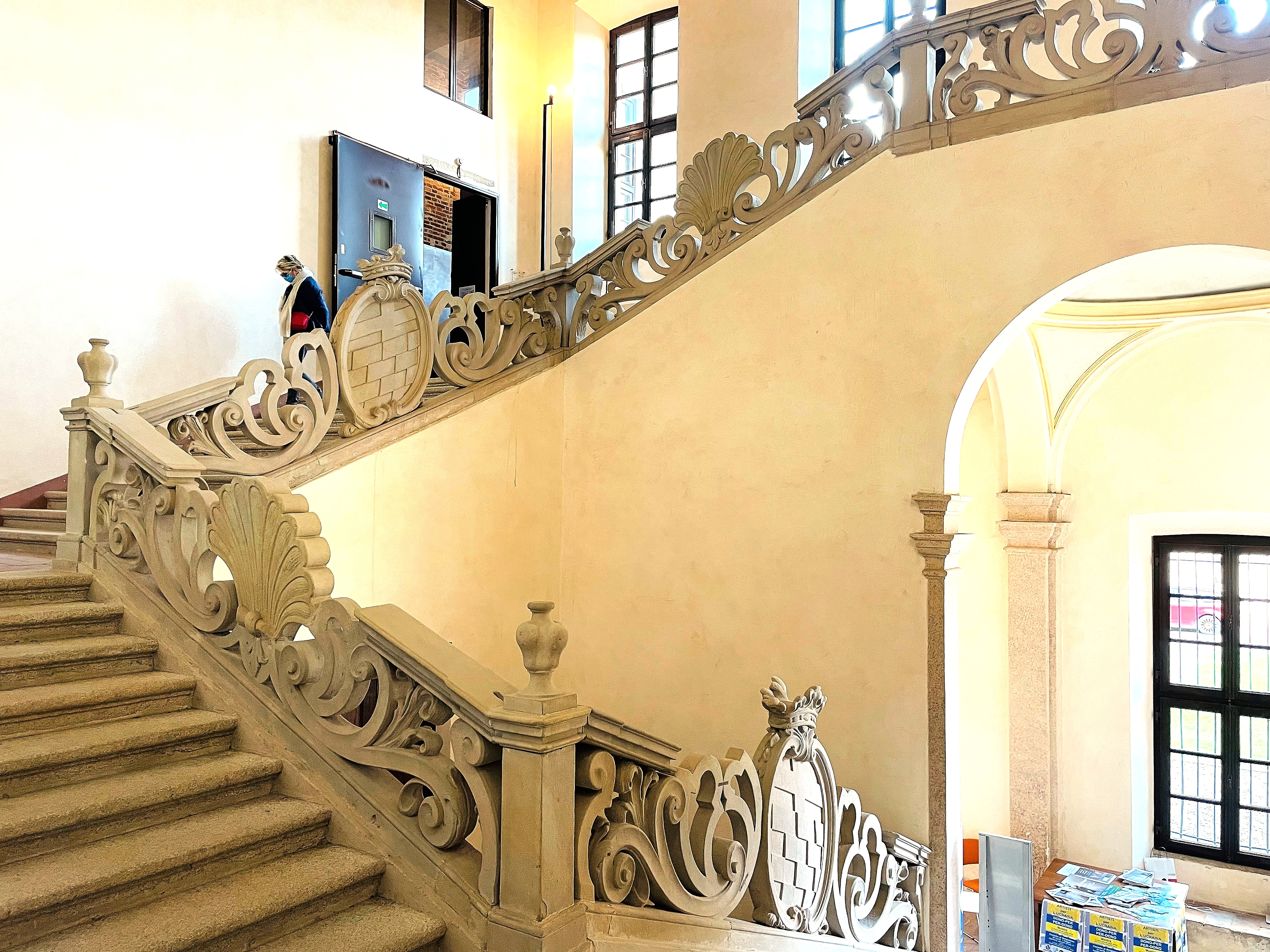
The grand staircase in the eastern part of the castle, 18th century.

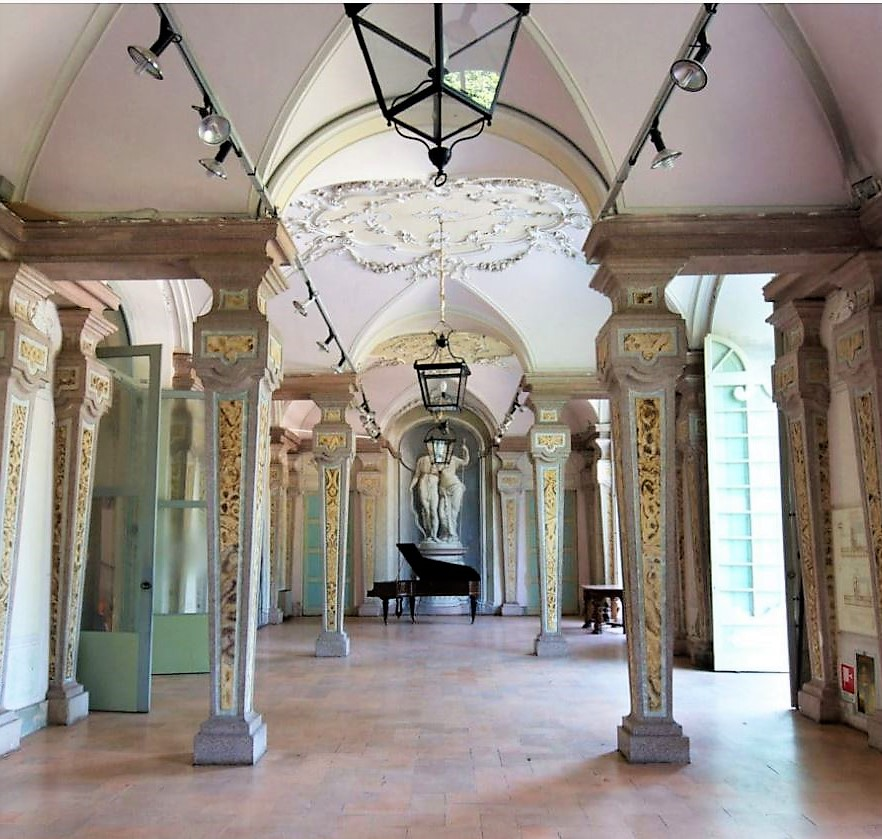
The atrium of the western part of the castle.

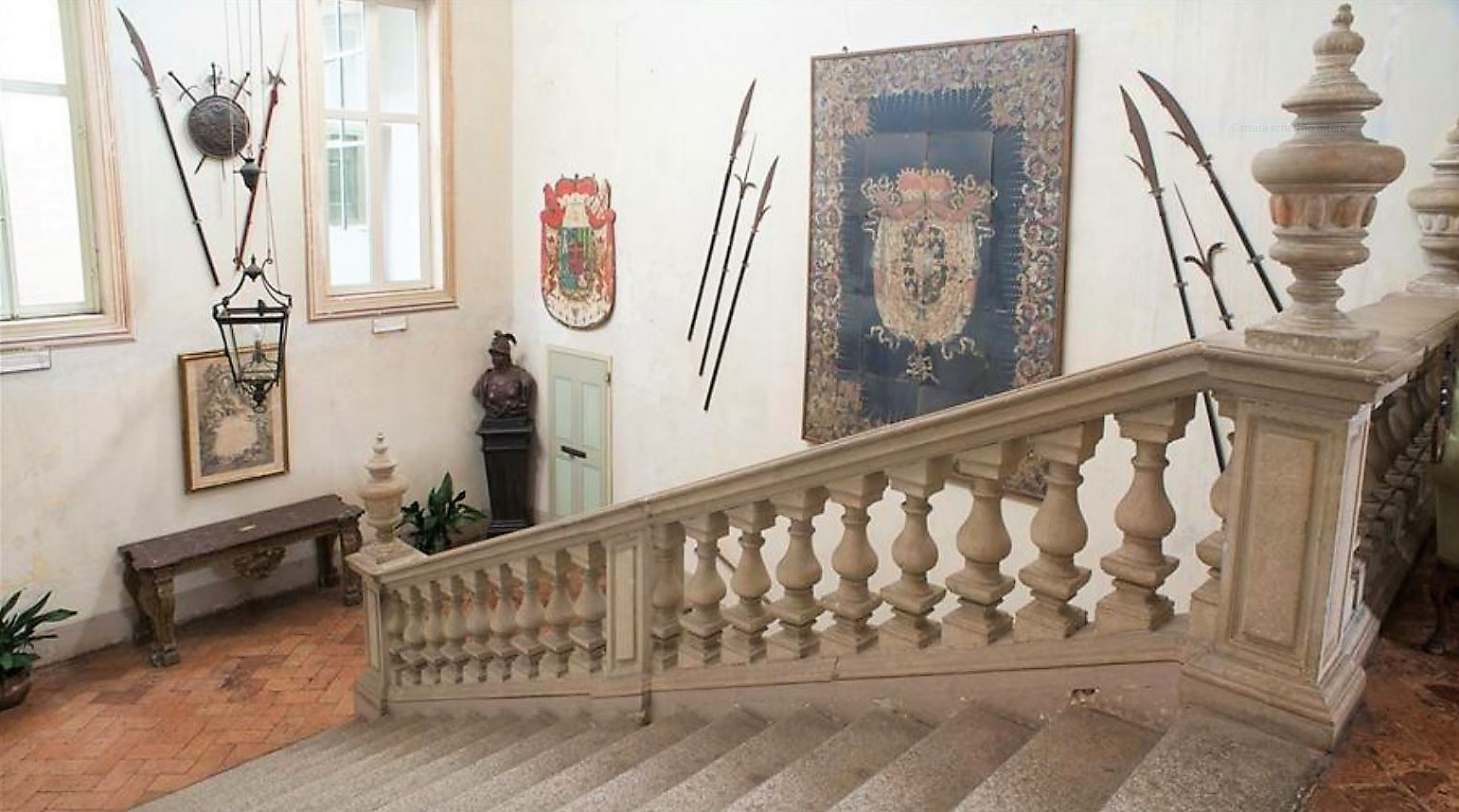
The grand staircase of the western part of the castle, 18th century.

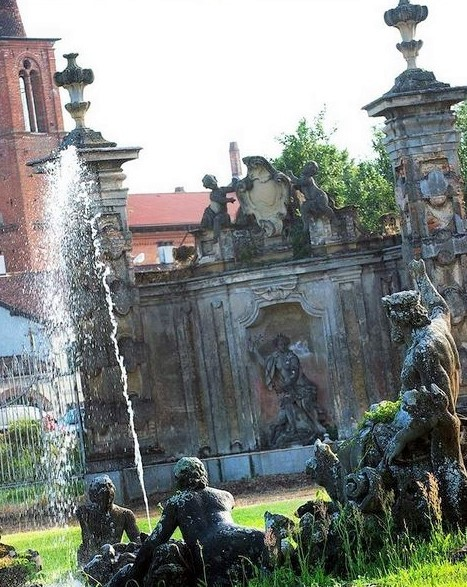
Carlo Beretta, fountain of Neptune and Thetis.

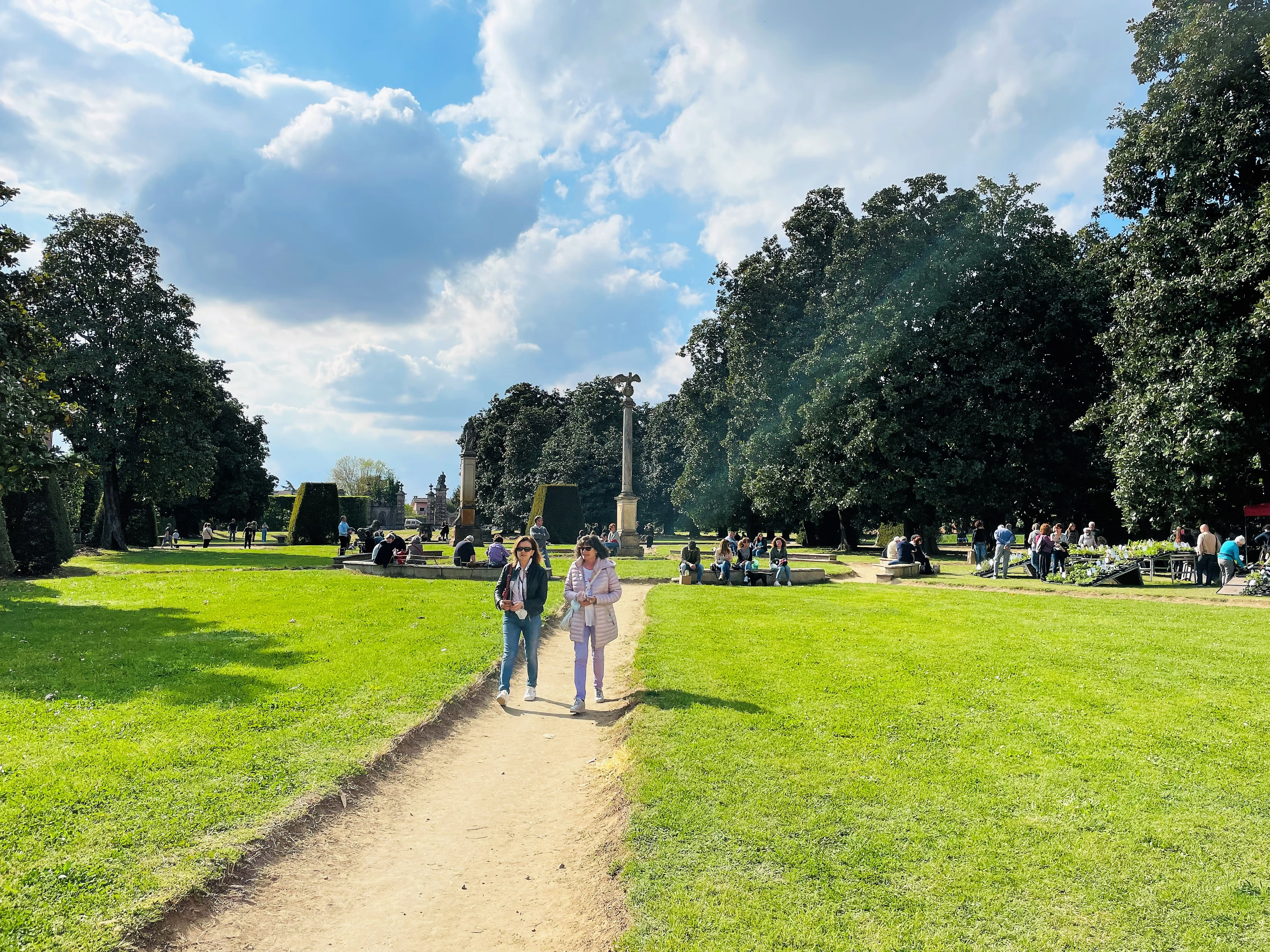
A glimpse of the park.

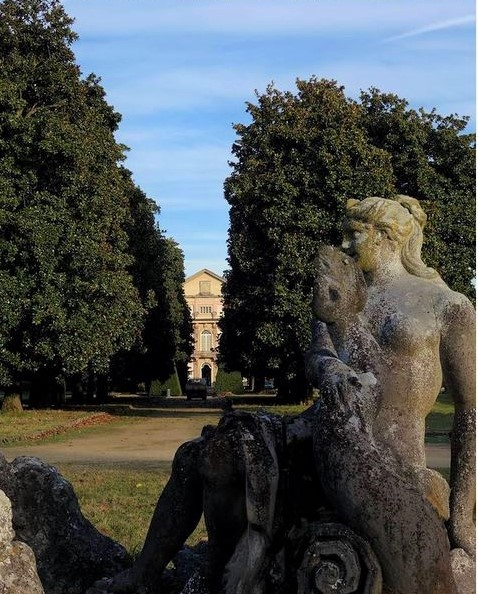
The park from the fountain of Neptune and Thetis.

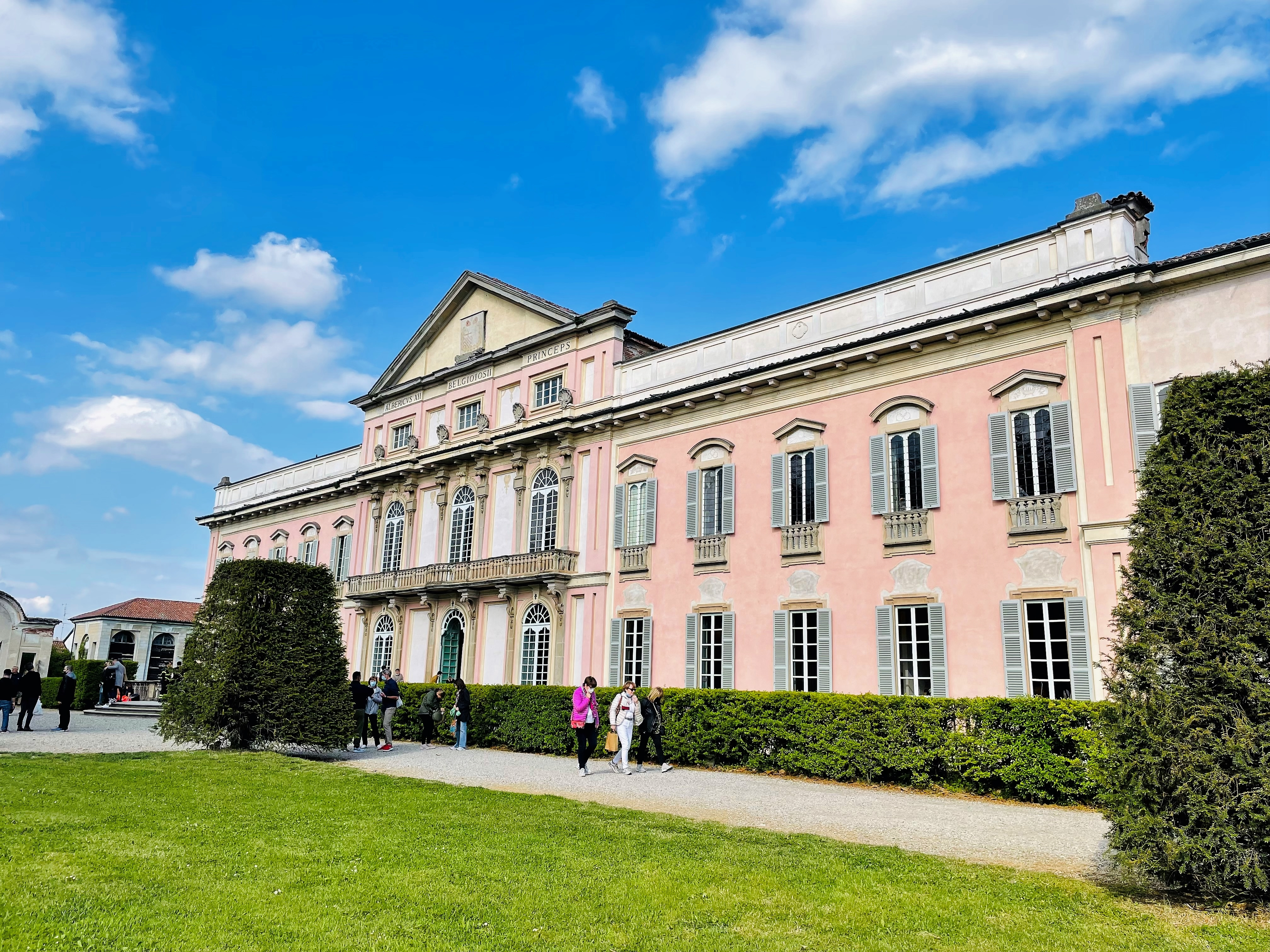
Belgioioso Castle

== See also ==
- Belgioioso, Lombardy
- Visconti Castle (Legnano)
- Lombardy
- Pavia
- Northern Italy

== Bibliography ==
- Cairati, Carlo (2020). Pavia viscontea. La capitale regia nel rinnovamento della cultura figurativa lombarda. Vol I: Il castello tra Galeazzo II e Gian Galeazzo (1359-1402) [Visconti Pavia. The royal capital in the renewal of Lombard figurative culture. Vol I: The castle between Galeazzo II and Gian Galeazzo (1359-1402)] (in Italian). Milan: Scalpendi Editore srl. p. 384. ISBN 9791259550187.
- Rocculi, Gianfranco (2017). "La sala delle imprese nel castello di Belgioioso" [The hall of enterprises in the castle of Belgioioso]. Nobiltà: Rivista di Araldica, Genealogia, Ordini Cavallereschi (in Italian). CXL.
- Galli, Letizia (2009). Riprendiamo le misure: rilievi e osservazioni per la conservazione del castello di Belgioioso [Resuming measurements: surveys and observations for the conservation of Belgioioso Castle] (in Italian). Pavia: TPC.
- Giuzzi, Marta (1995). Il castello di Belgioioso [The Belgioioso Castle] (in Italian). Castelsangiovanni: Pontegobbo.
- Tozzi, Pierluigi (1974). "Iscrizioni latine antiche e moderne al Castello di Belgioioso" [Ancient and modern Latin inscriptions at Belgioioso Castle]. Bollettino della Società Pavese di Storia Patria (in Italian). LXXIV–LXXV.
- Vaccari, Pietro (1954). "Castelli del Pavese: Belgioioso e Chignolo Po" [Castles of Pavia: Belgioioso and Chignolo Po]. Ticinum (in Italian). 10.
- Rillosi, Attilio (1927). Ugo Foscolo nel castello di Belgioioso [Ugo Foscolo in the Belgioioso Castle] (in Italian).
