= Giovanni Barbiano di Belgiojoso =

Italian nobleman and soldier (1638–1715)

Giovanni Barbiano di Belgiojoso (28 May 1638 – 20 December 1715) was an Italian nobleman and soldier.

== Bibliography ==
- A. Valori, Condottieri e generali del Seicento, Roma 1934, p. 28.
