= Cotignola =

- Comune
- Comune di Cotignola
- Coat of arms

- Location within Italy Location within Emilia-Romagna
- Coordinates: 44°23′N 11°56′E
- Country: Italy
- Region: Emilia-Romagna
- Province: Ravenna (RA)
- Frazioni: Barbiano, Budrio, San Severo di Cotignola, Cassanigo, Zagonara

Government
  - Mayor: Federico Settembrini

Area
  - Total: 35.0 km^{2} (13.5 sq mi)
- Elevation: 19 m (62 ft)

Population (31 December 2010)
  - Total: 7,414
  - Density: 212/km^{2} (549/sq mi)
- Demonym: Cotignola
- Time zone: UTC+1 (CET)
  - Summer (DST): UTC+2 (CEST)
- Postal code: 48033
- Dialing code: 0545
- Patron saint: St. Stephen
- Saint day: December 26
- Website: Official website

Cotignola (Romagnol: Cudgnôla) is a comune (municipality) in the Province of Ravenna in the Italian region Emilia-Romagna, located about 50 kilometres (31 mi) southeast of Bologna and about 20 kilometres (12 mi) west of Ravenna.

Cotignola was the birthplace of the 15th century condottiero Muzio Attendolo, whose family Sforza later ruled Milan, Pesaro and other seigniories in Italy. The other condottiero Alberico da Barbiano was born in the frazione of Barbiano.

Cotignola borders the following municipalities: Bagnacavallo, Bagnara di Romagna, Faenza, Lugo, Solarolo. It is mentioned for the first time in 919 (as Cotoniola) and was later the fief of the counts of Cunio, who had a castle in Barbiano. In the 15th century, it was ruled by the Sforza, then by the Este and, from 1598, it was part of the Papal States.

During the late stages of World War II, Cotignola was near the front line over the Senio river. Eighty percent of the urban buildings were destroyed by the Allied bombings, with some 270 civilian casualties.

== Twin towns ==
- Hüttlingen, Germany, since 2007
- Delle, France, since 2012
- Be'er Ya'akov, Israel, since 2022
