= Solarolo =

Solarolo Slarôl (Romagnol)
- Comune
- Comune di Solarolo
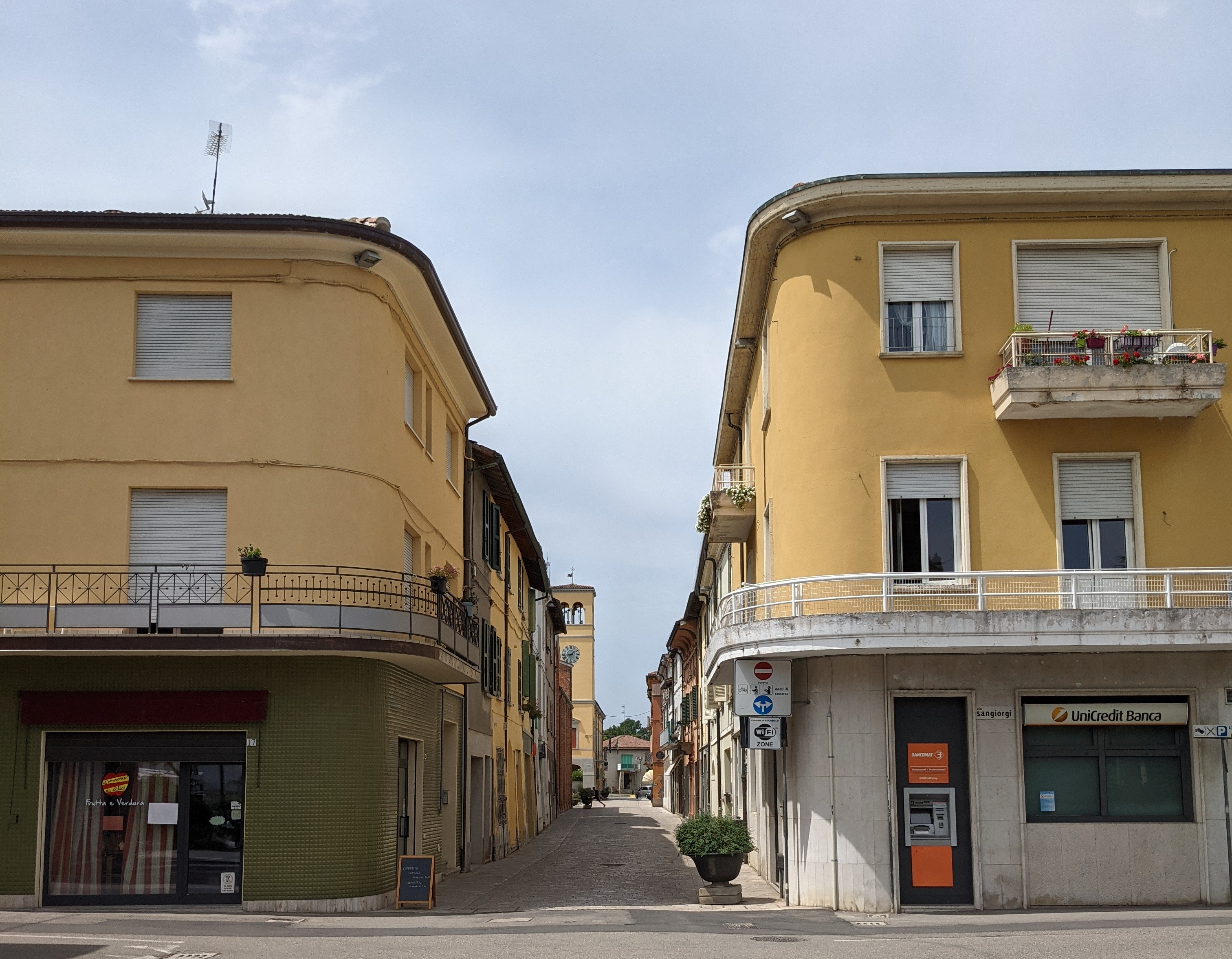

- Location within Italy Location within Emilia-Romagna
- Coordinates: 44°22′N 11°51′E
- Country: Italy
- Region: Emilia-Romagna
- Province: Ravenna (RA)

Government
  - Mayor: Fabio Anconelli

Area
  - Total: 26.3 km^{2} (10.2 sq mi)
- Elevation: 25 m (82 ft)

Population (31 December 2014)
  - Total: 4,472
  - Density: 170/km^{2} (440/sq mi)
- Demonym: Solarolesi
- Time zone: UTC+1 (CET)
  - Summer (DST): UTC+2 (CEST)
- Postal code: 48027
- Dialing code: 0546
- Website: Official website

Solarolo (Romagnol: Slarôl) is a comune (municipality) in the Province of Ravenna in the Italian region of Emilia-Romagna, located about 40 kilometres (25 mi) southeast of Bologna and about 30 kilometres (19 mi) west of Ravenna.

Solarolo borders the following municipalities: Bagnara di Romagna, Castel Bolognese, Cotignola, Faenza, Imola.

It is known for being singer Laura Pausini's home town.

== History ==
The area has been inhabited since the Bronze Age. Ruins of a village were found: the settlement was active between 1600 and 1200 B.C. and it was organized in distinct clusters separated by trenches; evidence of bovine rearing and cultivation of cereals was found. Starting from 187 B.C., an intense activity of centuriation was performed by the Romans and this is still visible nowadays in the lattice of the streets in the countryside; villae were also built in this lattice.

The toponym Solarolus appears for the first time in 993 as the name of an acreage and only in 1138 as Castrum Solarolii connected with a fortification. During the following centuries, the area of Solarolo changed several dominations, mainly by the families Manfredi, Borgia, Gonzaga, Este.

During the 17th century, Solarolo became part of the Papal States and, during the 19th century, of the newborn Kingdom of Italy.

== Twin towns ==
Solarolo is twinned with:

- Rhêmes-Notre-Dame, Italy, since 1999
- Kirchheim am Ries, Germany, since 2005
- Páty, Hungary, since 2007
