= Bagnaia =

Bagnaia may refer to:

== Places ==
- Bagnaia, Anghiari, a village in the province of Arezzo, Italy
- Bagnaia, Livorno, a village in the province of Livorno, Italy
- Bagnaia, Perugia, a village in the province of Perugia, Italy
- Bagnaia, Murlo, a village in the province of Siena, Italy
- Bagnaia, Viterbo, a village in the province of Viterbo, Italy

== People ==
- Francesco Bagnaia (born 1997), Italian motorcycle racer
