= Alberico da Barbiano =

Italian condottiero (c. 1344–1409)

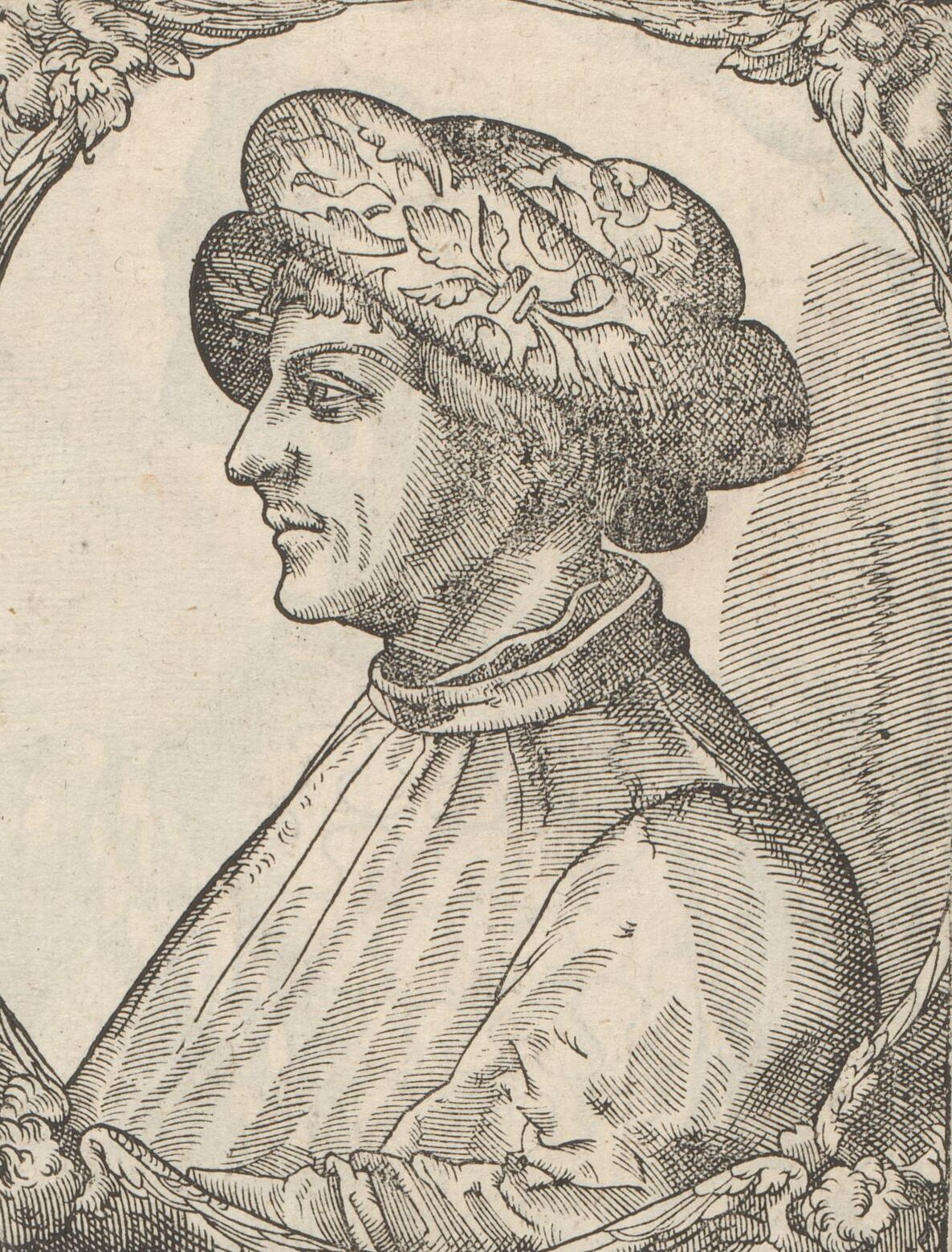
- Engraved portrait of Alberico da Barbiano by Tobias Stimmer
- Born: c. 1344; Barbiano di Cotignola
- Died: c. April 1409 (aged 64–65); Città della Pieve
- Military career
- Allegiance: Republic of Venice; Republic of Florence; Papal States; Duchy of Milan
- Known for: Leader of the Company of St. George
- Conflicts: War of the Eight Saints; War of Chioggia; Battle of Casalecchio

Alberico da Barbiano (c. 1344 – 1409) was an Italian condottiere. His master in military matters was the English mercenary John Hawkwood, known in Italy as Giovanni Acuto. Alberico's compagnia fought under the banner of Saint George, as the compagnia San Giorgio.

== Biography ==
Italy looked on with disdain at those wandering hordes of mercenaries—disheveled, savage, driven by nothing but greed, and accustomed to every kind of audacity. [...] It awaited a genius who would show those disordered troops where glory resides, and where disgrace; who would lead them into open fields, form them into proper military order, and drive them forward—firm, compact, and better trained—to change the fate of cities and scatter foreign infantry and cavalry in chaotic retreat. That long-awaited genius came to Italy: he was Alberico da Barbiano.

— Ariodante Fabretti, Biografie dei capitani venturieri dell'Umbria, vol. 1, Montepulciano, 1842, p. 109.

Born in Barbiano di Cotignola, a commune of what is now eastern Emilia-Romagna, Alberico was the son of Aldisio. The family were nobles of Romagna of long-standing, claiming descent from Carolingian times. They were hereditary lords of Barbiano, Cunio, and Lugo di Romagna and claimed as kin the lords of Ravenna, Forlì and Carrara. He married Beatrice da Polenta of Ravenna, and they had two sons, Manfredo and Ludovico.

Alberico gained his first military experience in the compagnia of the English captain John Hawkwood, taking part in the famous slaughter at Faenza and the "Cesena Bloodbath" in the 1370s. Allegedly touched by these excesses, Alberico left the foreign compagnia, deciding to form a military corps constituted only by Italian mercenaries.

Barbiano's Compagnia di San Giorgio ("St. George Company") renovated the military style of the mercenary companies of the period, with sharply improved cavalry armour and tactics, and with strong attention paid to the training aspect. Famous condottieri like Facino Cane, Jacopo dal Verme, Braccio da Montone and Muzio Attendolo began their military career in the St. George Company. Starting with 200 men, Alberico could soon boast 4,000 soldiers under his command, prompting a quick decline of the foreign companies that had dominated the Italian grounds till that moment.

The first condotta ("contract") for Alberico's force was in 1378, at the service of Barnabò Visconti of Milan, against the Scaliger and the Carraresi. The following year Alberico was called by Pope Urban VI to fight against Antipope Clement VII, the slaughterer at Cesena. The latter's infamous Breton troops were crushed in the neighbourhood of Rome on 29 June 1379, after five hours of battles.

Alberico was later involved in the war for the Crown of Naples between Queen Joan I (and her husband Otto of Brunswick) and Charles of Durazzo, backed by Urban VI. On 18 June 1381, Alberico defeated Otto and subsequently besieged Joan in the Castel Nuovo of Naples. After the Queen was captured and imprisoned in the Abruzzi, Barbiano was named gran conestabile ("chief of staff") by the new king Charles III, and in his new role he had to face Louis I of Anjou, Joan's heir, who had arrived in Italy with an army of 40,000 men. Alberico managed to protect Forlì and Cesena. However, Louis defeated Charles III at Campobasso and was declared king of Naples.

Louis eventually died after a pestilence, while Urban VI changed sides declaring Alberico, who was besieging him in Nocera, to be an enemy of the church. Charles was assassinated on 24 February 1386, but Barbiano declared his loyalty to the latter's son Ladislaus. The latter had to face a new French invasion, this time led by Louis II. Alberico for the first time in his career was defeated, at Ascoli Piceno, in 1392. Gian Galeazzo Visconti paid 3,000 florins for his freedom, engaging him for the war against Florence, Bologna and Mantua. Alberico won a series of battles in 1397 and was ready for the final siege of Mantua. However, a treaty of peace signed by Visconti with Francesco I of Gonzaga stopped him.

During his campaign in 1399, his brother Giovanni, was captured and beheaded by the enemy condottiero Astorre I Manfredi.

On 26 June 1402, he defeated a combined Bolognese-Florentine army at the Battle of Casalecchio, leading to the Milanese conquest of Bologna. The following year he left Milan to re-enter service to Ladislaus of Naples.

Alberico da Barbiano died in the spring of 1409, on the way to meet his king at Città della Pieve (Umbria).

== Legacy ==
His son Ludovico was a count of Lugo from 1411. The latter's son Alberico II was ousted from the city in 1431, and moved to Lombardy, where his heirs became feudataries of Belgioioso (current province of Pavia) and founded the House of Barbiano di Belgioioso. In 1566 the Barbiano-Belgioioso received the title of "Grandees of Spain" and in 1769 the rank of Prince of the Holy Roman Empire.

In 1930 the Italian Regia Marina launched a cruiser Alberico da Barbiano of the Condottieri class.
