= Barbiano di Cotignola =

Frazione of Cotignola, Italy

Coordinates: 44°23′N 11°52′E

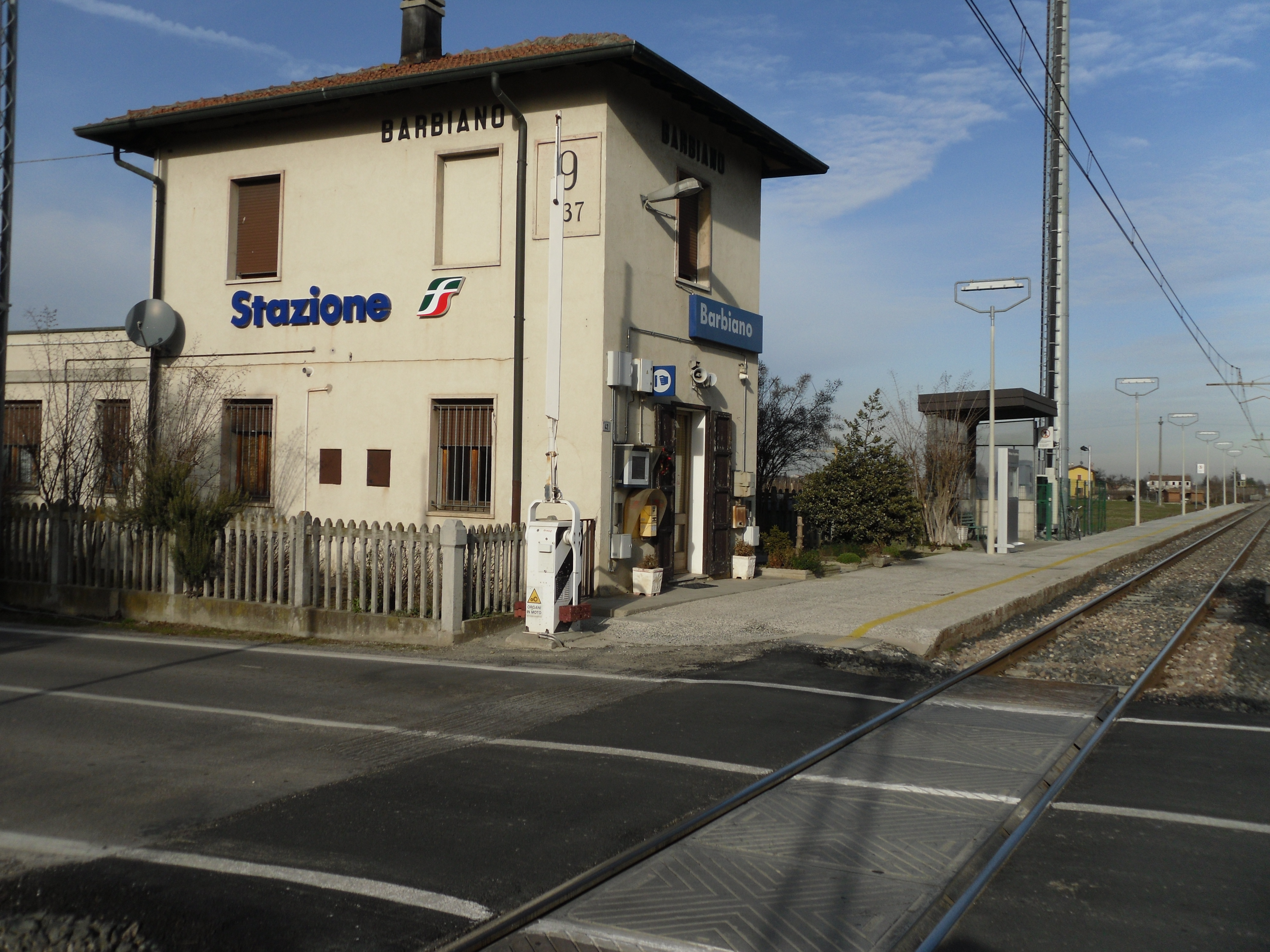
Barbiano railway station

Barbiano di Cotignola is a frazione (parish) of Cotignola, in the province of Ravenna, Italy. It is a small village, known as the birthplace of the medieval condottiero Alberico da Barbiano.

It is home to a Romanesque pieve.

== History ==
The pieve (rural church) around which Barbiano formed is known from 826, when Pope Eugene II gave it to Everard, a son of the last king of the Lombards, Desiderius. The pieve at the time also controlled that of Lugo di Romagna.

A castle was built in Barbiano by Rainero I, Everardo's grandson, in 860. This fortress was destroyed on 16 May 1409, a month after the death of the condottiero Alberico da Barbiano, lord of the village's fief. In the 15th century the area was ruled by the Sforza family, and in the following century it passed under the Este. In 1598 it became part of the Papal States, under which it remained until the Unification of Italy in 1861. In 1796 it was the seat of an ambush against French occupation troops, a feat which led, in retaliation, to the ravage of Barbiano and Lugo on 30 June/8 July.

During World War II, Barbiano was captured by the 2nd New Zealand Infantry Division on 9/10 April 1945, after six months of bombardments.
