= Belgioioso, Lombardy =

Belgioioso Belgios / Belgiojos (Lombard)
- Comune
- Comune di Belgioioso
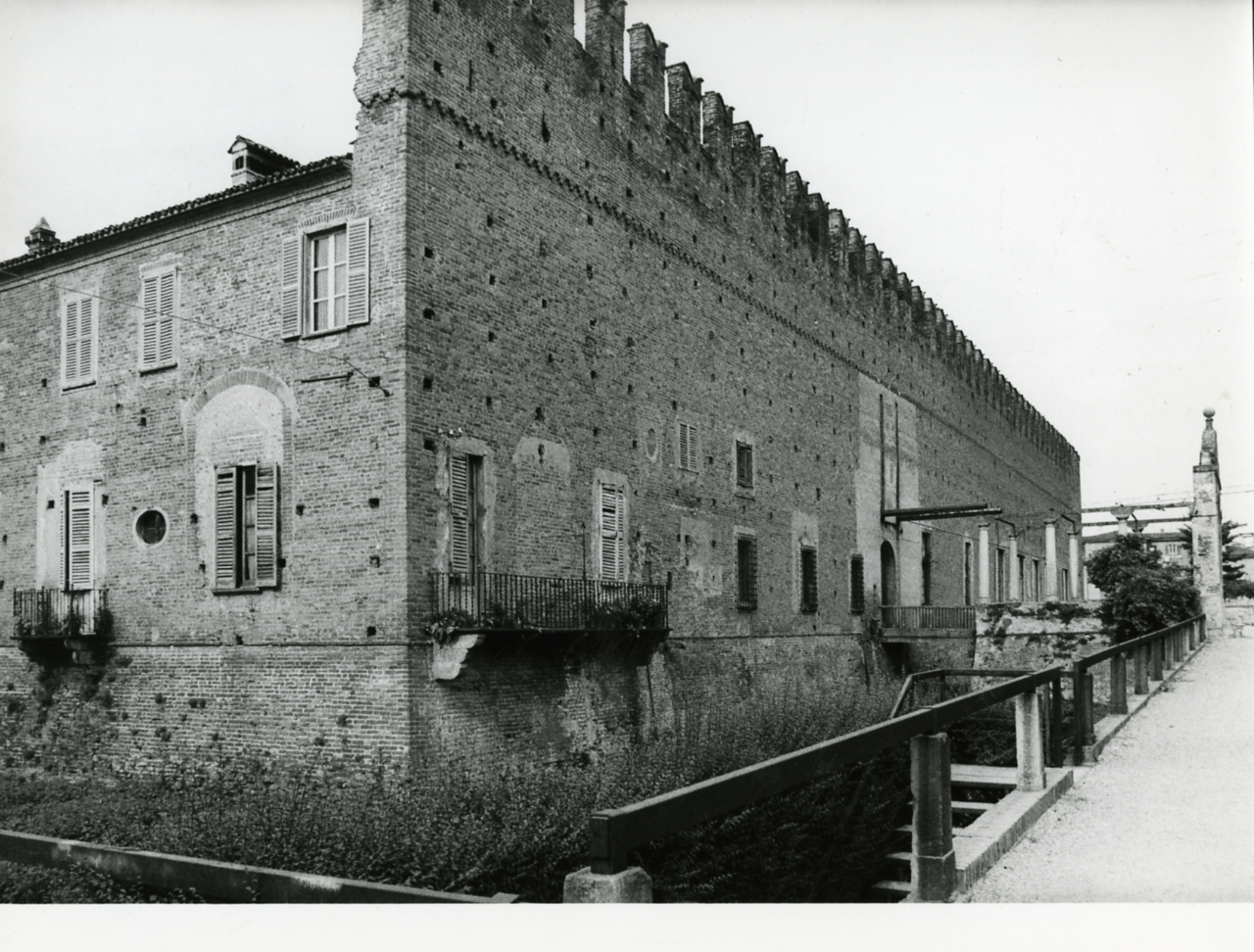
- View of Belgioioso

- Coat of arms

- Location within Italy Location within Lombardy
- Coordinates: 45°10′N 9°19′E
- Country: Italy
- Region: Lombardy
- Province: Province of Pavia (PV)
- Frazioni: San Giacomo della Cerreta, Santa Margherita

Area
  - Total: 24 km^{2} (9.3 sq mi)
- Elevation: 75 m (246 ft)

Population (December 2004)
  - Total: 5,752
  - Density: 240/km^{2} (620/sq mi)
- Demonym: Belgioiosini
- Time zone: UTC+1 (CET)
  - Summer (DST): UTC+2 (CEST)
- Postal code: 27011
- Dialing code: 0382
- Website: Official website

Belgioioso or Belgiojoso (Italian: [beldʒoˈjoːzo, -oːso]; Lombard: Belgios [belˈdʒuːs] or Belgiojos [ˌbɛldʒuˈjuːs]) is a town and comune in the Province of Pavia, region of Lombardy (northern Italy), with a population of 6,233 (2017).

It is 12 km east of the city of Pavia, between the Olona River and the Po River. Due to its geographical location, Belgioioso has become one of the southern suburbs of the city of Milan.

Belgioioso is noted for its medieval castle, the seat of the Belgioioso family. Francis I of France was held there after the Battle of Pavia.

== Twin towns ==
Belgioioso is twinned with:

- La Fouillouse, France

== See also ==
- Belgioioso Castle
