= Bagnara di Romagna =

- Comune
- Comune di Bagnara di Romagna
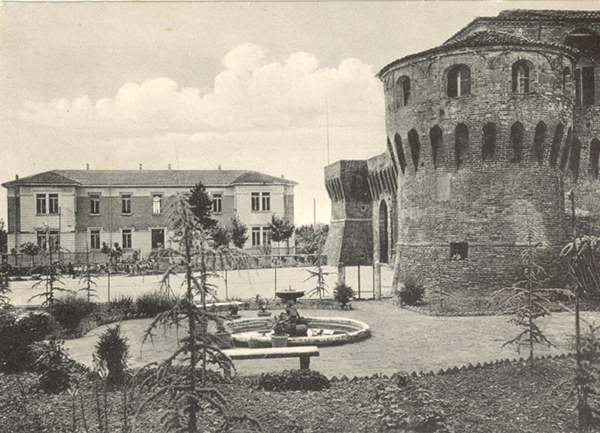

- Location within Italy Location within Emilia-Romagna
- Coordinates: 44°23′N 11°50′E
- Country: Italy
- Region: Emilia-Romagna
- Province: Ravenna (RA)
- Frazioni: S. Filippo

Government
  - Mayor: Mattia Galli

Area
  - Total: 9.96 km^{2} (3.85 sq mi)
- Elevation: 22 m (72 ft)

Population (September 2025)
  - Total: 2,334
  - Density: 234/km^{2} (607/sq mi)
- Demonym: Bagnaresi
- Time zone: UTC+1 (CET)
  - Summer (DST): UTC+2 (CEST)
- Postal code: 48031
- Dialing code: 0545
- ISTAT code: 039003
- Patron saint: Saint Andrew
- Saint day: 30 November
- Website: Official website

Bagnara di Romagna (Romagnol: Bagnêra) is a comune (municipality) in the Province of Ravenna in the Italian region Emilia-Romagna, located about 40 km (25 mi) southeast of Bologna and about 30 km (19 mi) west of Ravenna.

Bagnara di Romagna borders the following municipalities: Cotignola, Imola, Lugo, Mordano, Solarolo. It is one of I Borghi più belli d'Italia ("The most beautiful villages of Italy").

== Twin towns ==
Bagnara di Romagna is twinned with:

- Adelmannsfelden, Germany, since 2007
- Saint-Drézéry, France, since 2009
