= Great Company =

The Great Company may refer to one of several armies of mercenaries in the late medieval period:

- The free companies that ravaged France and Italy
- Catalan Company, sometimes called the Catalan Great Company
- Great Company (German), operative in Italy in the 1350s
- Great Company (English), first operative in eastern France and Provence in the 1350s, then in Italy, where it became the White Company

== See also ==
- Hudson's Bay Company, often referred to as the great company
