= Rodrigo de Villandrando (routier) =

Mercenary military leader during the Hundred Years' War

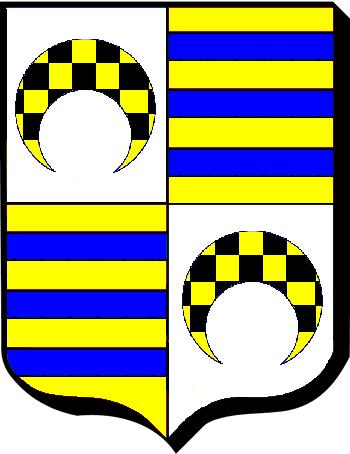
Coat-of-arms of Villandrando.

Rodrigo de Villandrando (died c. 1457) was a Spanish routier from Castile and mercenary military leader in Gascony during the final phase of the Hundred Years' War. He was famous for his pillaging and was consequently known as the Emperor of Pillagers (empereur des brigands) or L'Écorcheur (the flayer).

Originally from Valladolid, he was the son of Pedro de Villandrando and Agnes de Corral. He became Count of Ribadeo and Valladolid. Around 1410 he arrived in France and was admitted into the company of Amaury de Séverac. He rose to become captain of the routiers, veritable mercenaries in the pay of the seneschal or various other powerful lords and even bishops. When his protector Amaury died in 1427, he entered the service of Charles VII of France. In 1428 he was joined by Juan Salazar, who became his lieutenant. In his early career he is known to have pillaged Treignac, Meymac, and Tulle.

On 11 June 1430 he participated in the Battle of Anthon with around 400 men armed with such prosaic devices as billhooks, sledge hammers, and spades. He participated on the side of the French king against Louis II of Chalon-Arlay, Prince of Orange and a vassal of Philip the Good.

In 1431 he was rewarded by John II of Aragon with the county of Ribadeo and the right to eat at his table once a year. That same year he pillaged Saint-Clément-de-Régnat and was employed by the French to put down a peasant rebellion, which he did by massacring the refugees at Saint-Romain-le-Puy. In September 1432 his routiers, in the pay of Georges de la Trémoille, held Les Ponts-de-Cé against the assaults of Jean V de Bueil. Around 1433, at the height of his power, he had around 10,000 mercenaries, mostly Englishmen called Rodrigoys, under his command and he was the terror of the countryside of the Médoc, where his men habitually held the petty lords of the region for ransom and forced protection money from the populace; they were constantly pillaging and ransacking the bastides. In 1433 he took the castle of Lagarde Viaur and held it for a very high ransom. In the late 1430s he pillaged Bor-et-Bar, Salers, and Laparade.

On 24 May 1433 he married Margaret, the half-sister of Charles I, Duke of Bourbon, and illegitimate daughter of Duke John I. For 6,000 écus he bought the castles of Ussel and then Châteldon from his brother-in-law. Between 1434 and 1439 he was subsequently installed in the fortress of Montgilbert.

In 1436 his men pillaged Cordes; in 1438 Lauzun, Fumel, Issigeac, and Blanquefort were hit. In 1437 his men violently despoiled the furriers of Charles VII at Hérisson. In 1438 he joined French forces under Charles II of Albret and Poton de Xaintrailles and embarked on a chevauchée in the Bordelais and Médoc. They were stopped only by the walls of Bordeaux itself.

In 1440 he fought with Charles of Bourbon against Charles VII in the revolt known as the Praguerie. In 1441 Changy and Pavie were pillaged by his men. In 1442 he again had the support of the French king for the depredation of northern Gascony. Later that year he and Albret threatened Bazas.

In 1443 a party of his men on the command of Salazar returned to Spain, plundering upper Languedoc and the Lauragais on the way. Banned thenceforward from the realm, Rodrigo returned to Spain, where he was made marshal of Castile. He willed his worldly goods to the church of Castile and retired from the world to a monastery, where he died sometime around 1457.

== Sources ==
- Labarge, Margaret Wade. Gascony, England's First Colony 1204–1453. London: Hamish Hamilton, 1980. ISBN 0-241-10309-6.
- Lodge, Eleanor Cabot. Gascony under English Rule. Port Washington: Kennikat Press, 1926. ISBN 0-8046-1232-3.
- Quicherat, J. E. J. Rodrigue de Villandrando, l'un des combattants pour l'indépendance française au XVe siècle. Paris: Hachette, 1879.
