= Free company =

Late medieval army of independent mercenaries

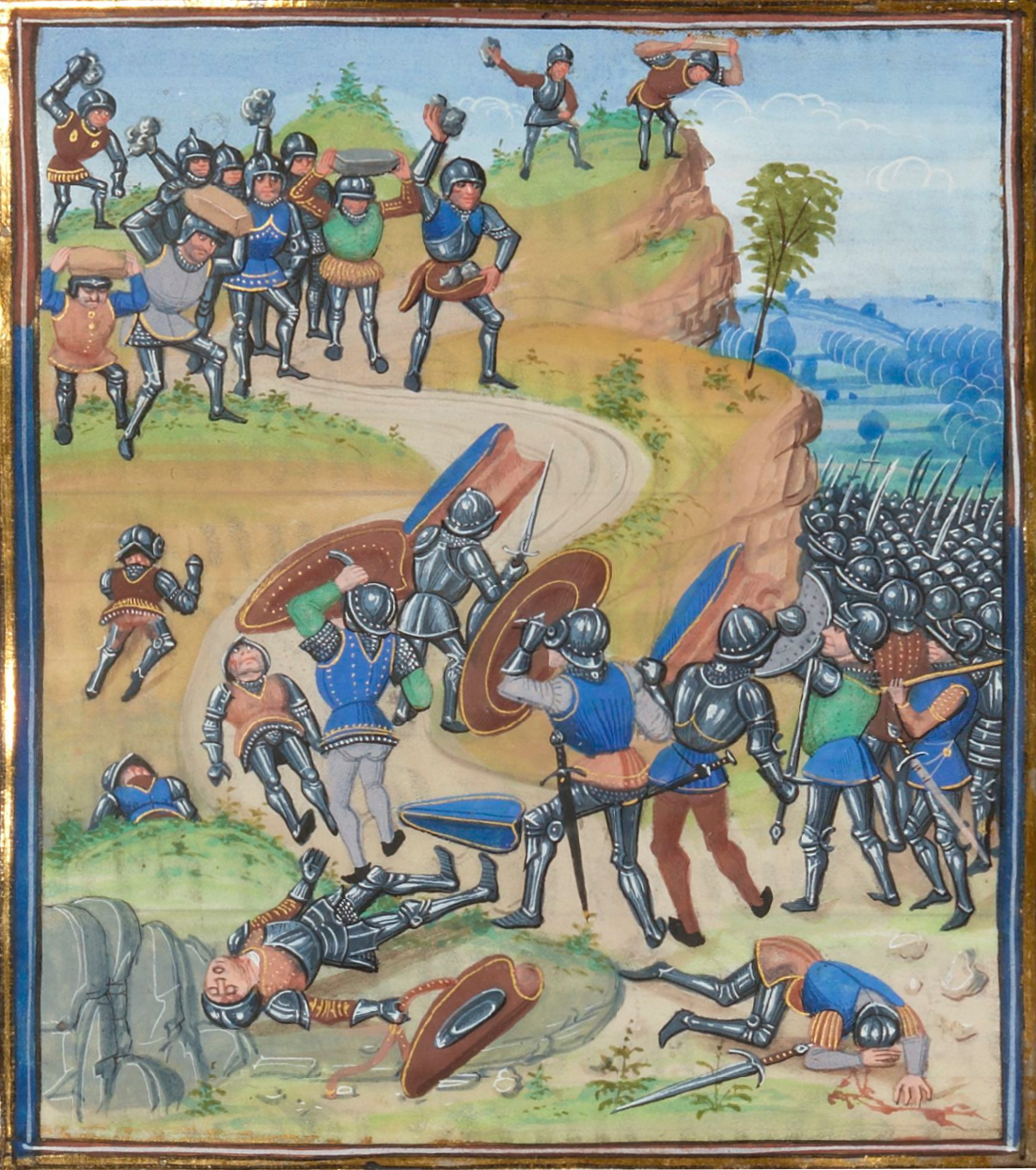
French troops being attacked by the Tard-Venus free company during the 1362 Battle of Brignais.

A free company (sometimes called a great company or, in French, grande compagnie) was an army of mercenaries between the 12th and 14th centuries recruited by private employers during wars. They acted independently of any government, and were thus "free". They regularly made a living by plunder when they were not employed; in France they were called routiers and écorcheurs and operated outside the highly structured law of arms. The term "free company" is most often applied to those companies of soldiers which formed after the Peace of Brétigny during the Hundred Years' War and were active mainly in France, but it has been applied to other companies, such as the Catalan Company and companies that operated elsewhere, such as in Italy and the Holy Roman Empire.

The free companies, or companies of adventure, have been cited as a factor as strong as plague or famine in the reduction of Siena from a glorious rival of Florence to a second-rate power during the later 14th century; Siena spent 291,379 florins between 1342 and 1399 buying off the free companies. The White Company of John Hawkwood was active in Italy in the latter half of the 14th century.

== Early history ==
Mercenary groups first appeared in the 12th century, when they participated in the Anarchy (a conflict of succession between King Stephen and Empress Matilda between 1137 and 1153).

In the 1180s, similar groups were integrated into the armies of the King of France under Philip II of France. These troops of seasoned mercenaries were organized and mobile, a valuable advantage during the battles of the time, and were important elements of the armies of Henry II of England and his son, Richard I. King John used them at the beginning of his reign, when he was richer and more powerful than the King of France. However, in 1204, he did not pay the mercenaries. Philip II of France used them to overcome the Plantagenets.

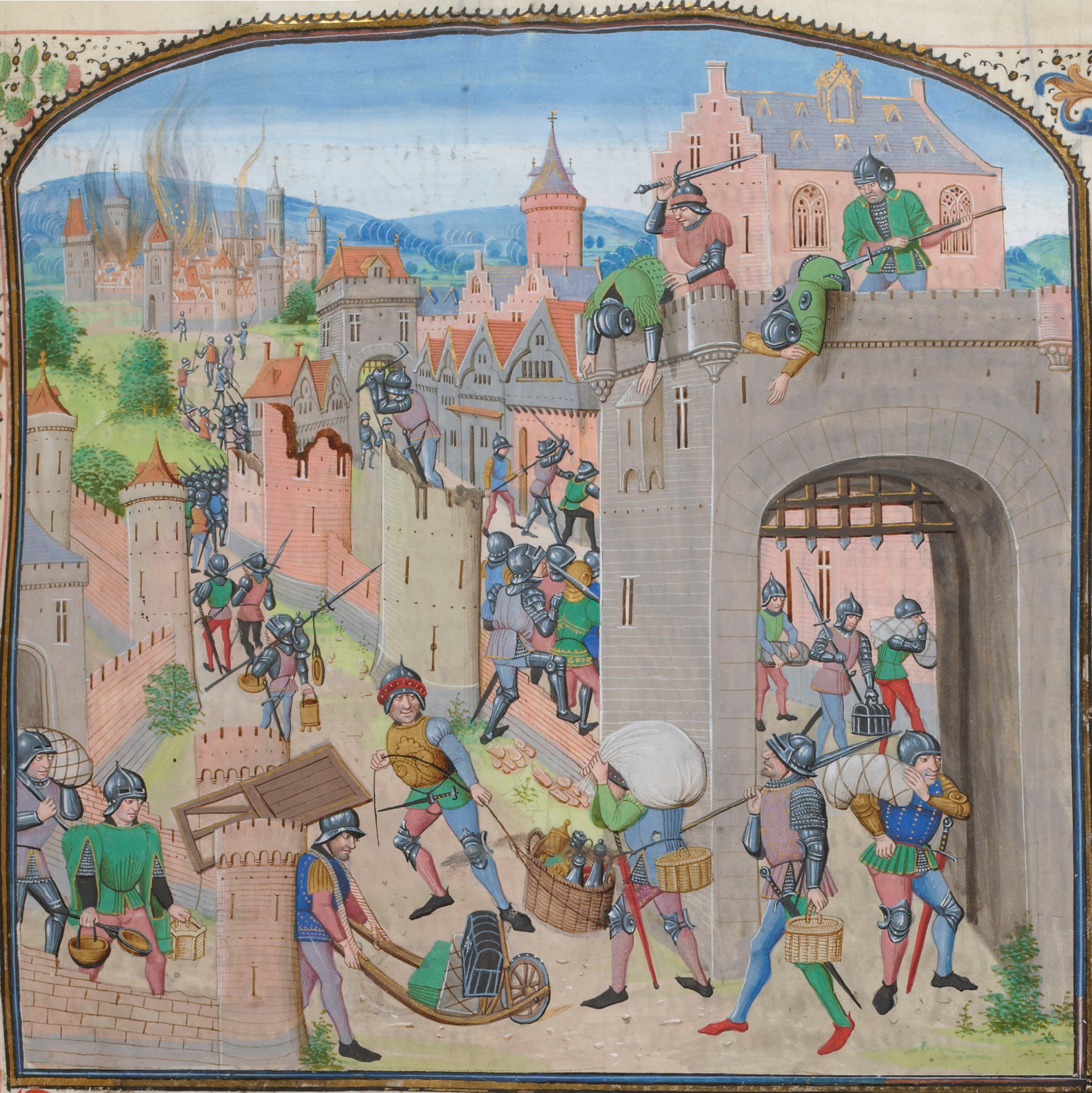
The Tard-Venus pillage Grammont in 1362, from Froissart's Chronicles.

During the Hundred Years War between England and France there were intermittent hostilities punctuated by periods of truce, when soldiers would be laid off en masse. In the absence of civilian skills and opportunities many, especially the foreign soldiers, formed armed bands known as bandes de routiers or écorcheurs and made a living by pillaging the countryside of southern France until hostilities resumed. Similar events occurred in Spain and Germany. By the time of the Treaty of Brétigny (1360), which brought about a several years suspension of the Hundred Years War, the bands had grown in size to the point where they had evolved an internal structure and adopted romantic names. The Tards-Venus (late-comers), led by Seguin de Badefol, ravaged Burgundy and Languedoc and even defeated the forces of the Kingdom of France at the Battle of Brignais in 1362.

The Catalan Company, formed in Spain in the early 1300s, fought in the Byzantine Empire before ending up in what is now Greece, and the Navarrese Company, also formed in Spain, followed them there.

By 1356, free companies, men at arms, and brigands had spread throughout the country from the Seine to the Loire engaging in unlawful activities. They had especially infested the roads from Paris to Orléans, Chartres, Vendôme, and Montargis.

== Brigands ==
Brigands were recruited from all nations, but mainly from troops dismissed from the army of Edward III of England after the peace treaty of Brétigny. On October 24, 1360, after the Treaty of Calais ratified the ceasefire of 8 May, Edward III had ordered the evacuation of English troops from fortresses in many parts of France.

One of the main brigand leaders was a Welshman named Ruffin, who was enriched by robberies and became a knight. These bands of brigands occupied and ransomed towns such as Saint-Arnoult, Gallardon, Bonneval, Cloyes, Étampes, Châtres, Montlhéry, Pithiviers-en-Gatinais, Larchant, Milly-la-Forêt, Château-Landon, and Montargis. Meanwhile, Robert Knolles headed an Anglo-Navarrese band of brigands near the borders of Normandy, where he earned 100,000 écus.

Eventually the King of France sent his constable to escort these bands to Spain in order to rid France of them. There they could assist Henry of Trastamara in his ongoing feud with his half-brother Peter of Castile. However, after placing Henry of Trastamara on the throne of Castile, the companies returned to France. One company plundered Vire in 1368 and another, conducted by John Cresswell and Folquin Lallemant, seized Château-Gontier.

The Tard-Venus were mercenaries who had been demobilized after the Treaty of Brétigny of 8 May 1360. Under the orders of Seguin de Badefol, they ranged from Burgundy to Languedoc. In 1362, in Brignais, they defeated Jacques de Bourbon, Count of La Marche.

The White Company (Compagnia Bianca) was also formed after the Treaty of Brétigny and was under the command of John Hawkwood.

The Bretons and the English in Dauphiné were companies which operated from 1374 to 1411, and accompanied the Counts of Armagnac, Turenne, and Duguesclin during their conflicts in Provence and Italy, which brought about the Great Schism between the popes of Avignon and Rome. One of their achievements was taking the Château de Soyons in 1381, from which they were later dislodged by Bouville, governor of Dauphine and Marshal Olivier V de Clisson. Their leaders were Guilhem Camisard, Amaury de Sévérac (the Bastard of Bertusan) and John Broquiers.

The Écorcheurs were demobilized mercenaries who desolated France in the 15th century after the Treaty of Arras in 1435.

== Italy ==
The structure of 12th-century Italy, where a patchwork of rich city states were in a state of perpetual dispute with their neighbours, provided an ideal base for the later and larger mercenary groups with their complements of cavalry, infantry and archers and complex internal structure. Predominantly made up of Italian and German troops, they included the Great Company formed by the German knight Werner von Urslingen (1342), the Compagnia di San Giorgio formed by the Italian nobleman Lodrisio Visconti in 1339, the White Company formed by Albert Sterz (1360) and the Compagnia della Stella of Anichino di Bongardo (Hannekin Baumgarten) (1364).

The companies made a good living by extortion (Siena paid the companies 37 times not to attack them) or by contracting to fight on behalf of one city state against another. They came to be known, in particular their leaders, as condottieri, from the Italian word for contractor. On several occasions the companies were contracted by different states to fight each other.

By the mid-1400s, the power of the free companies had come to an end with the rise in centralised state power and military force.

== List of Free Companies ==
Company	Founded	Leaders	Notes
Catalan Company	1302	Roger de Flor; Bernat de Rocafort	Disbanded, 1390
Navarrese Company	c.1360	Mahiot of Coquerel; Pedro de San Superano	Disbanded, c.1390?
Great Company	1342	Werner von Urslingen; Fra' Moriale; Konrad von Landau	Disbanded, 1363
Compagnia di San Giorgio (I)	1339	Lodrisio Visconti	Disbanded, 1339
Compagnia di San Giorgio (II)	1365	Ambrogio Visconti	Disbanded, 1374
Compagnia di San Giorgio (III)	1377	Alberico da Barbiano	Italians only
White Company	c.1360	Albert Sterz; John Hawkwood	Disbanded c.1390
Company of the Hat	1362	Niccolò da Montefeltro	Disbanded, 1365
Compagnia della Stella (I)	1364	Anichino di Bongardo; Albert Sterz	Disbanded, 1366
Compagnia della Stella (II)	1379	Astorre I Manfredi	Disbanded, 1379
Company of Bretons	c.1375	Jean Malastroit	
Company of the Hook	1380	Villanozzo of Brumfort; Alberico da Barbiano	
Company of the Rose	1398	Giovanni da Buscareto; Bartolomeo Gonzaga	Disbanded, 1410

== See also ==
- Compagnie d'ordonnance
- Routiers
- Condottiero
- Freikorps
- Tard-Venus
- Écorcheurs
- Religious military orders - Chivalric orders of knights associated with the Catholic Church, but not necessarily any particular feudal state or kingdom.
  - Knights Templar
  - Knights Hospitaller
  - Teutonic Knights
  - Spanish military orders, who were associated with various Christian states of the Reconquista
