= Albert Sterz =

German condottiero

Albert Sterz (known in Italy as Alberto Sterz) was a German noble who was a leader of mercenary Free companies, primarily operating in Italy.

Born in what is now Germany he moved to France to fight alongside the English during the Hundred Years War. When a truce was agreed between England and France at Brétigny in 1360 he formed, with other demobilised soldiers of fortune such as the Englishman John Hawkwood, a company of mercenaries originally named the Great Company. Later to be known as the White Company it recruited unemployed veteran English, German and Gascon soldiers and, like other similar groups (or companies), it survived initially by extortion, threatening to ravage towns if not bought off. Starting in the Champagne district they worked their way south and set up a base only 25 miles from Avignon, where the Pope of that time lived. There they extorted 100,000 florins from the Pope after promising not to attack and to leave the area. The Pope suggested they might like to go to Italy to give military aid to the Marquis of Montferrat who was feuding with the powerful Visconti family of Milan.

The company spent almost a year in Savoy before signing a six-month contract with the Marquis of Montferrat to help him fight the Viscontis. After hearing the Lord of Pavia was sick he teamed up with Luchino Novello Visconti of Genoa to attack the town. Ransoms for captured townspeople brought in 180,000 florins. Further attacks on numerous other towns followed.

In April 1363 he finally confronted the rival Great Company of Konrad von Landau who were under contract to the Viscontis. At the Battle of Canturino bridge near Romagnano Sesia in Piedmont Sterz's forces overcame the opposition and the injured Landau was captured, dying later that day from his injuries. The Great Company never recovered from its defeat.

Sterz then contracted with the town of Pisa to assist them in a war with neighbouring Florence. During the rest of that year, his troops attacked several Florentine towns. In mid-1364, owed back-pay by Pisa, Sterz switched sides to fight for Florence, leaving the White Company and joining up with Anichino di Bongardo (Hannekin Baumgarten) to form the Compagnia della Stella (Company of the Star).

At the end of 1365, he signed up with the Papal States and suffered a defeat at the hands of the Perugian forces led by his erstwhile colleague Bongardo. In 1366 he signed up himself to defend Perugia. However, accused of treachery by the Perugians, he was arrested and executed in the town in early November. After his death, the Compagnia della Stella disbanded.
