= Battle of Portomaggiore =

1395 battle in Italy

Date	16 April 1395
Location	Portomaggiore, Ferrara, Italy 44°42′N 11°48′E
Result	Ferrara Regency Council victory

Belligerents
Ferrara Regency Council and allies	Azzo X d'Este

Commanders and leaders
Astorre I Manfredi	Giovanni da Barbiano

Strength
3,000 (estimated)	8,000 (estimated)

Casualties and losses
100 (estimated)	1,000 plus 2,000 prisoners (estimated)

The Battle of Portomaggiore took place near Portomaggiore in the province of Ferrara, Italy on 16 April 1395. It was fought between the Este troops of the Ferrara Regency Council fighting in the name of the young Niccolò III d'Este, Marquis of Ferrara and the rebel forces of his uncle, Azzo X d'Este, pretender to the Lordship of Ferrara.

== Background ==
After the death of Alberto d'Este, Marquis of Ferrara, he was succeeded by his legitimated son Niccolò, who was still a minor. His uncle Azzo claimed the title on the grounds of Niccolò's young age and his legitimacy but was rebuffed by the Regency Council (a council formed to rule Ferrara during Niccolò's minority). Azzo therefore organised a military force by the hiring of mercenaries.

== Battle ==
The two armies met at Portomaggiore, some 10 miles (15 kilometres) southwest of the city of Ferrara. The Regency Council forces were under the command of Astorre Manfredi, a condottiero (mercenary leader) who had once formed the Compagnia della Stella, a private mercenary army. He had the support of troops from Florence, Bologna, Venice, and Carrara. Azzo's force of mercenaries was led by the condottiero Giovanni da Barbiano.

The Regency Council troops quickly attacked Azzo's 8,000-strong army, eventually forcing them to retreat and seek refuge in the castle, where they were ultimately forced to surrender. Azzo's forces lost some 1,000 men and Azzo himself was captured. Regency Council losses were limited.
