= Saint-Romain-le-Puy =

- Commune
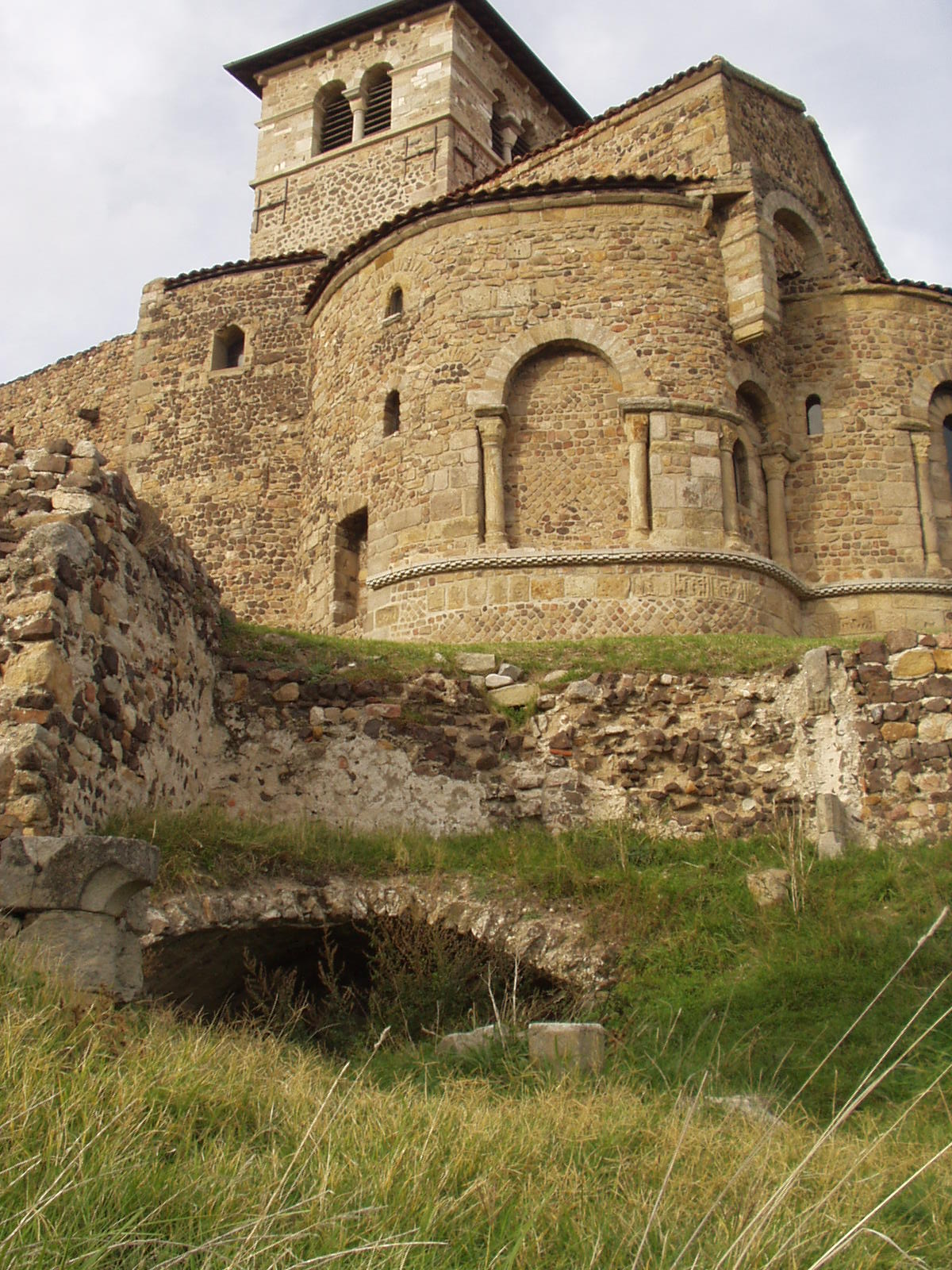
- Priory church

- Coat of arms
- Location of Saint-Romain-le-Puy
- Location within France Location within Auvergne-Rhône-Alpes
- Coordinates: 45°33′22″N 4°07′26″E
- Country: France
- Region: Auvergne-Rhône-Alpes
- Department: Loire
- Arrondissement: Montbrison
- Canton: Montbrison
- Intercommunality: Loire Forez Agglomération

Government
  - Mayor (2024–2026): Christian Soulier
- Area^{1}: 21.14 km^{2} (8.16 sq mi)
- Elevation: 407 m (1,335 ft)
- Highest elevation: 524 m (1,719 ft)
- Lowest elevation: 366 m (1,201 ft)
- Population (2023): 4,142
  - Density: 195.9/km^{2} (507.5/sq mi)
- Time zone: UTC+01:00 (CET)
  - Summer (DST): UTC+02:00 (CEST)
- INSEE/Postal code: 42285 /42610
- ^{1} French Land Register data, which excludes lakes, ponds, glaciers > 1 km^{2} (0.386 sq mi or 247 acres) and river estuaries.

Saint-Romain-le-Puy (French pronunciation: [sɛ̃ ʁɔmɛ̃ lə pɥi]) is a commune in the Loire department in central France.

The town is located 8 km (5.0 mi) from Montbrison along the D8. It was originally built on the volcanic peak (le puy), but has since migrated to the plain.

== Geography ==
Le Puy itself is of volcanic origin and the surrounding plain of Forez has basaltic conglomerates. Wells have been sunk to exploit the naturally sparkling mineral waters.

== History ==
Le Puy is located on the Roman road, the Bolène Way, linking Lyon (Lugdunum) to Bordeaux (Burdigala), which was constructed during the reign of the emperor Augustus, by his son-in-law Agrippa. It is also on the Gallo-Roman way from Sury to Changy. These roads were later reused by pilgrims to Santiago de Compostela.

About 500, Carétène (aunt of Saint Clotilde the wife of Clovis) replaced a temple of Venus (famous for a bath of youth utilising the areas' mineral springs) by a Christian church dedicated to Saint Michael.

Guy II de Forez, the feudal lord of Saint-Romain-le-Puy, was the vassal of Louis VII. In 1173, the fief of Saint-Romain was transferred from Ainay Abbey to the County of Lyon.

In 1218, Count Guy IV de Forez, gave the priory (founded in 1007) into the care of the religious of Saint-Thomas-les-Nonnains.

There was longstanding conflict between the chateau and the priory.

In 1431, the town was pillaged by routiers under Rodrigo de Villandrando on orders from the Crown as part of the quashing of a jacquerie.

In 1531, Forez passed from the control of the Dukes of Bourbon to the Crown of France.

In 1633, the surrounding town wall was destroyed by order of Richelieu.

During World War I, the town lost 102 soldiers.

== Population ==
Historical population
Year	Pop.	±% p.a.
1968	2,459	—
1975	2,475	+0.09%
1982	2,423	−0.30%
1990	2,616	+0.96%
1999	2,803	+0.77%
2007	3,419	+2.51%
2012	3,746	+1.84%
2017	3,998	+1.31%
2023	4,142	+0.59%
Source: INSEE

== Economy ==
Local industries include Mineral Waters (François Parot, a public works entrepreneur sunk a well in 1858) and Glassmaking (Saint-Gobain-Emballage factory founded in 1893). Agriculture includes beef rearing, dairying and wine-growing.

== Sights ==
- Priory of Saint-Romain-le-Puy 10th century to 14th century. Fortified priory on a hill, founded by Ainay Abbey. Historic Monument;
- Château de La Bruyère and its outbuildings are late 18th century - early 19th century. The current castle was started in 1792 by Damian Battant de Pomerol, a lawyer in Montbrison, and was completed about 1803. Quid mentions that a castle in the town was referred to in the 12th century. Historic Monument - protected elements include the pigeon loft, roofing, salon and interior décor. There is also a fine park. Ref: E. Salomon, Les châteaux historiques de Forez, In-4, 1926, t. I, p66-70;

== International relations ==
The commune is twinned with Monte San Biagio (Italy).

== See also ==
- Communes of the Loire department
