= Battle of Canturino =

1363 battle in PIedmont

Coordinates: 45.63°N 8.38°E

Date	22 April 1363
Location	Bridge of Canturino, Romagnano Sesia, Piedmont
Result	Montferrat victory

Belligerents
Marquisate of Montferrat	Duchy of Milan

Commanders and leaders
Albert Sterz; John Hawkwood	Konrad von Landau (DOW)

Units involved
White Company	Great Company

Strength
Unknown but included English, German, Hungarian and Genoese troops	Unknown but included German and Hungarian troops

Casualties and losses
Unknown	Unknown

The Battle of Canturino (22 April 1363) was a clash of two condottiere companies, the long-established Great Company under Konrad von Landau and the newer White Company under Albert Sterz and John Hawkwood near Novara, north-west of Milan.

== The battle ==
The exact details of the battle are unknown. The men-at-arms of both sides are said to have dismounted to fight. The battle was swayed by two events. The Hungarians in the Great Company refused to fight their fellow countrymen in the White Company and left the field, leaving the Great Company at a disadvantage. Shortly after this, Konrad von Landau was hit in the face by a rock which broke the nosepiece of his helmet, partly incapacitating him. The loss of their leader and part of their army undermined the Great Company and they fled. Konrad von Landau was captured alive but he had been further wounded in the melee and died shortly afterwards.

== Aftermath ==
The Battle of Canturino led to a truce but had no other significant result other than the death of Landau and the demise of the Great Company. It was, however, the first field action fought by the White Company and the beginning of their rise to prominence. In July 1363, after a bidding war for its services between Pisa and Florence, the company entered Pisan employ.
