= Portomaggiore =

- Comune
- Comune di Portomaggiore
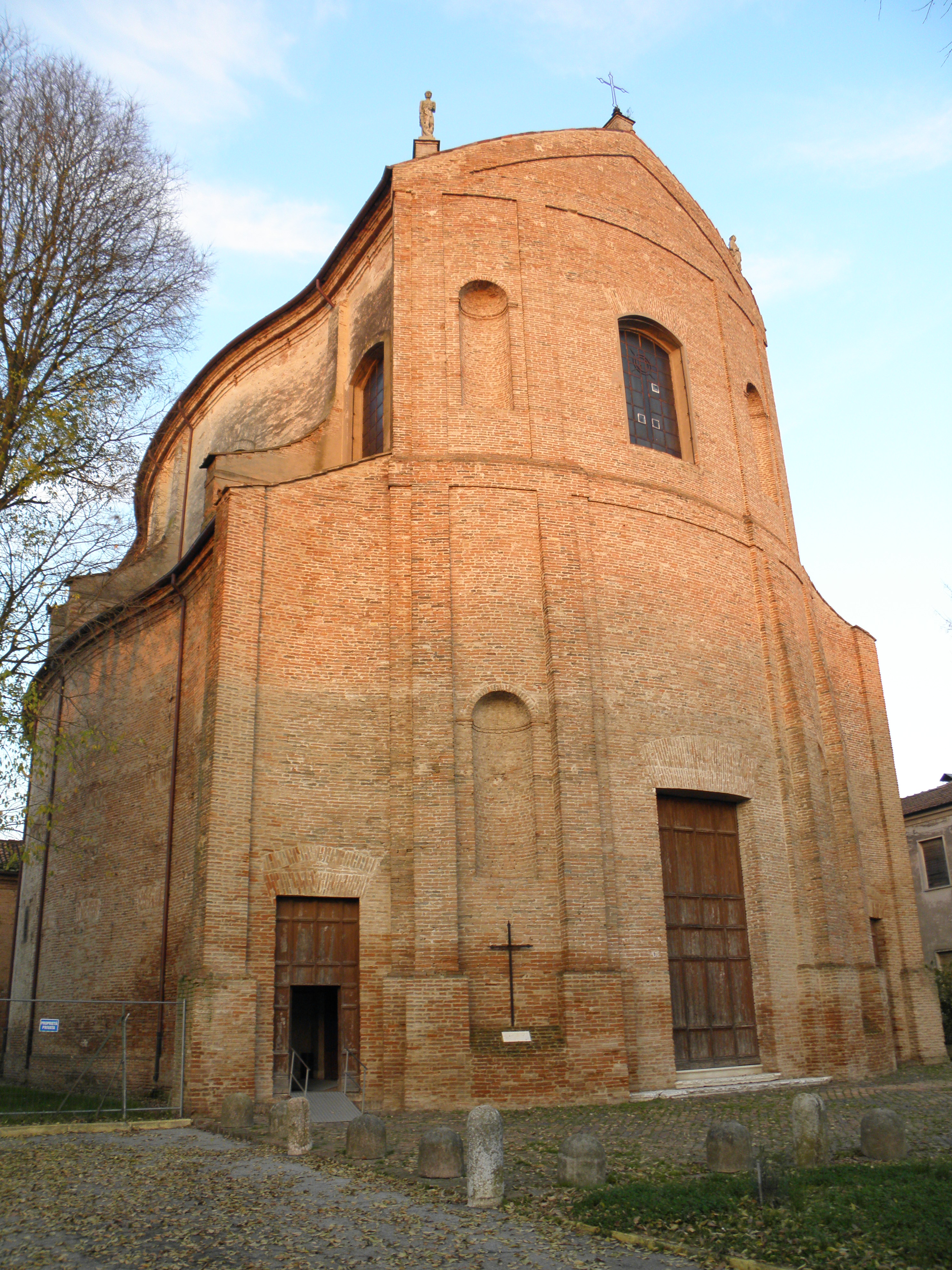
- Church of San Giorgio in Gambulaga

- Flag Coat of arms

- Location within Italy Location within Emilia-Romagna
- Coordinates: 44°42′N 11°48′E
- Country: Italy
- Region: Emilia-Romagna
- Province: Ferrara (FE)
- Frazioni: Gambulaga, Maiero, Portorotta, Portoverrara, Quartiere, Ripapersico, Runco, Sandolo

Government
  - Mayor: Nicola Minarelli

Area
  - Total: 126 km^{2} (49 sq mi)
- Elevation: 2 m (6.6 ft)

Population (31 May 2022)
  - Total: 11,642
  - Density: 92.4/km^{2} (239/sq mi)
- Demonym: Portuensi
- Time zone: UTC+1 (CET)
  - Summer (DST): UTC+2 (CEST)
- Postal code: 44015
- Dialing code: 0532
- Patron saint: St. Charles Borromeo
- Website: Official website

Portomaggiore (Ferrarese: Portmagiòr) is a town and comune in the province of Ferrara, Emilia-Romagna, Italy.

== History ==
In the Battle of Portomaggiore of 1395, mercenary troops of the Ferrara Regency Council, assisted by allies from Florence, Bologna, and Venice and fighting in the name of the young Niccolò III d'Este, Marquis of Ferrara beat the rebel forces of his uncle, Azzo X d'Este, pretender to the Lordship of Ferrara. Azzo X d'Este was captured in the battle.

== Main sights ==
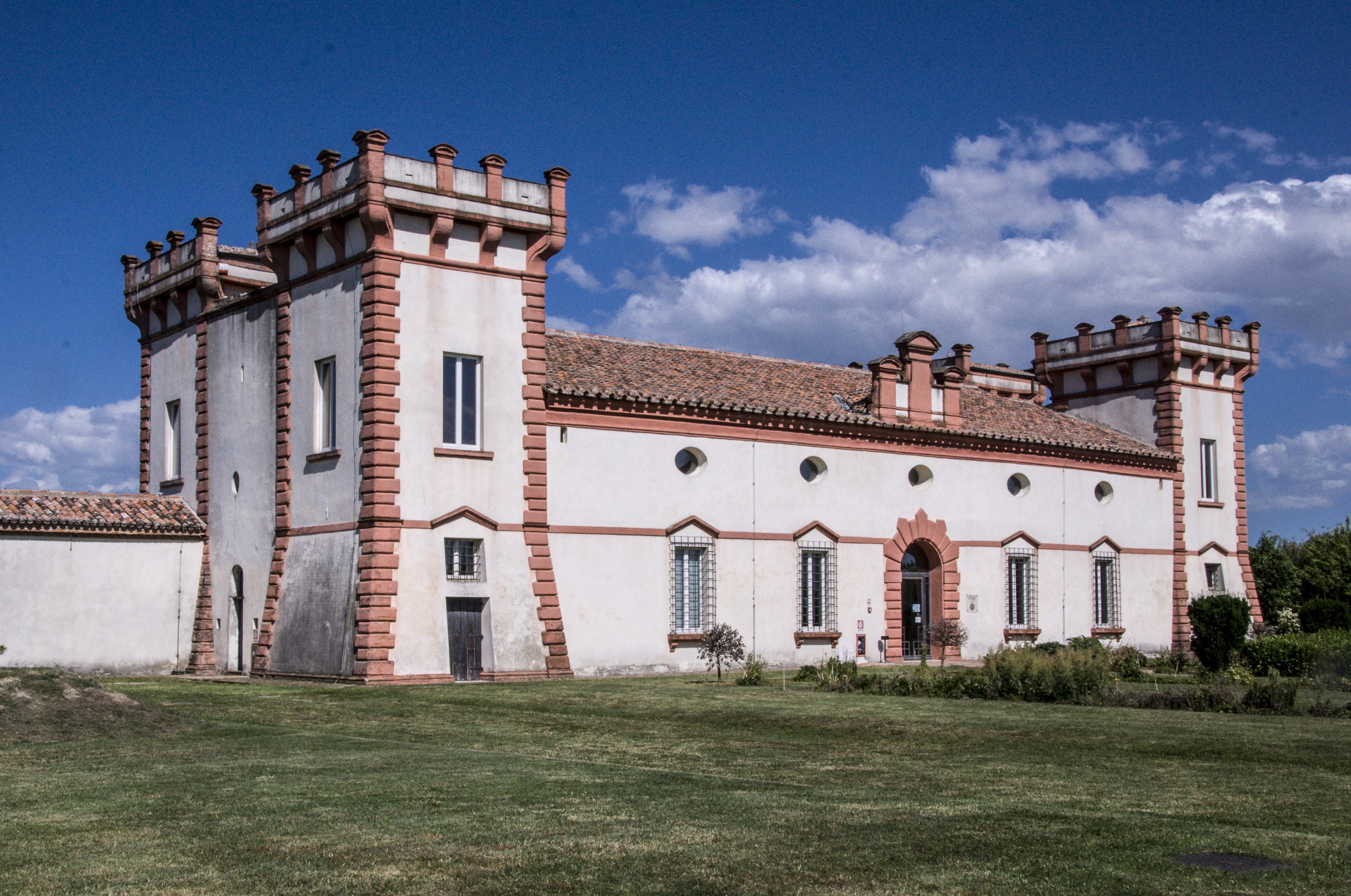

The main attraction of the comune is the Delizia del Verginese, in the frazione of Gambulaga, a castle-residence built by Duke Alfonso I d'Este in the early 16th century. Also remarkable is the church of San Giorgio, Gambulaga.

== Notable residents ==
Davide Santon, a former footballer and Marcella Tonioli, an Italian compound archer, were born in Portomaggiore.
