= Company of the Hat =

14th-century condottieri

The Company of the Hat (Compagnia del Cappalletto) or the Black Company (Compagnia Nera) was a company of mercenary soldiers which operated in northern Italy in the 14th century. It was noteworthy as a Free Company which was created by and largely made up of Italians.

It was formed in Ossaia, Italy in August 1362 by the condottiere Niccolò da Montefeltro, together with Marcolfo dei Rossi and Ugolino dei Sabatini. It recruited dissatisfied Italian fighters serving the city of Florence and the name of the new group stemmed from their practice of hoisting their caps in the air in protest. Originally numbering some 1000 Italian, Burgundian and German knights, the company was led by Niccolò da Montefeltro.

In 1363, the company was in the service of Florence, for whom they fought against the towns of Pisa and Siena and the White Company. However the enemy's militia, comprising 800 knights under Ors Orsini, surprised Montefeltro's company and captured and imprisoned the latter with 1,300 of his men. After this defeat, the company was broken up and dispersed, many of the men accepting service in neighbouring Perugia. In 1365, after a period of inactivity, the company joined with the Compagnia di San Giorgio and fought against Florence, Siena and the Papal State.
