= Caferro =

Caferro is a surname. Notable people with the surname include:

- Mary Caferro (born 1959), American politician
- William Caferro, American historian
