= Écorcheurs =

French armed bands in the reign of Charles VIII

The écorcheurs (French: [ekɔʁʃœʁ], lit. "flayers") were armed bands who desolated France in the reign of Charles VII, stripping their victims of everything, often to their very clothes.

They were mercenaries without employment since the Treaty of Arras which ended disputes between the Armagnacs and Burgundians in 1435. Rodrigo de Villandrando was known as the "Emperor of Pillagers" (empereur des brigands) and "L'Écorcheur" (the flayer).

== History ==
From the mid-14th century the French royal forces, whether voluntary or semoncées, had become institutionalized. The permanence of conflicts during the Hundred Years War (1337–1453) had created career soldiers, paid by the king or nobles. These were not mercenaries, as their vassals and clientelistic ties remained parallel to their economic interest in war. During times of peace or truce, these unemployed warriors gathered in bands and lived on pillage and ransoms. In the 14th century, after the Peace of Brétigny-Calais (1360), large armies of mercenaries armies were disbanded, on occasion without receiving their pay.

Those who did not have the financial means to go home or wanted to continue their martial lifestyle, which was highly profitable, then formed autonomous bands of the road which exerted pressure on the regions of France. These were the great companies (not be confused with the grandes companies, which are rather the result of political instability in fifteenth century France and were mercenaries in the strict sense).

== See also ==
- Routiers
- White Company
- Free company
