= Compagnia della Stella =

14th century mercenary free companies

The La Compagnia della Stella (Company (or Fellowship) of the Star) was the name of two separate companies of mercenary soldiers which operated in northern Italy at different times in the 14th century.

== Compagnia della Stella of Albert Sterz ==
The first company with the name was formed in August 1364 by the condottieri (soldiers of fortune) Anichino di Bongardo (Hannekin Baumgarten), Albert Sterz and Ugo della Zuccha and was composed largely of English and German mercenary soldiers. Bongardo contributed the men of his own company and Albert Sterz many men of the White Company who followed him when he left it after its mauling at the Battle of Cascina. The name referred to the emblem of the Knights of Bongard, the family to which Anichino belonged. The following month Anichino left the company and command devolved to Albert Sterz.

Under Sterz's leadership the company was hired by the Papal States who were engaged in hostilities with Perugia. The Star Company comprised about 5,000 cavalry and 1,000 infantrymen, while that of Perugia consisted of some 10,000. Fighting took place over five months in Umbria, Tuscany and Lazio, with the main battle taking place in San Mariano, near Corciano, where the Sterz forces were comprehensively defeated by the White Company in 1365. They were then hired by Perugia, but disbanded after Sterz had been accused of treachery by the Perugians and beheaded in the town.

== Compagnia della Stella of Astorre Manfredi ==
The second company of the name was formed in Soragna in June 1379 by Astorre I Manfredi, who recruited adventurers mainly from Emilia-Romagna, initially having a complement of about 600 lancers and 2,000 infantry.

The company tried to attack Bologna and Rimini, but was then hired by Bernabò Visconti of Milan and the Venetians during the War of Chioggia between Venice and Genoa. In August 1379, on the orders of Visconti, they attacked Genoa and looted several villages of the city, including Sampierdarena. However, their most important battle took place on September 24 of that year when 400 lancers and 3,000 infantry under Manfredi were defeated by the Genoese near the Bisagno valley. Most of Manfredi's mercenaries were captured, with the exception of Manfredi himself, who was saved by a farmer to whom he promised a reward of 10,000 ducats. Many of the captured mercenaries were subsequently executed by the local people.

== Bibliography ==
- E. Ricotti - Storia delle compagnie di ventura in Italia - ed. Giuseppe Pompa, Torino, 1847.
- A. Sorbelli - Corpus chronicorum bononiensium, vol.3 - Città di Castello, Lapi, 1939.
- M. Mallet - Signori e mercenari - La guerra nell'Italia del Rinascimento - Il Mulino, Bologna, 1983.
