= San Giorgio, Gambulaga =

Roman Catholic church in Italy

Coordinates: 44.74494°N 11.78993°E

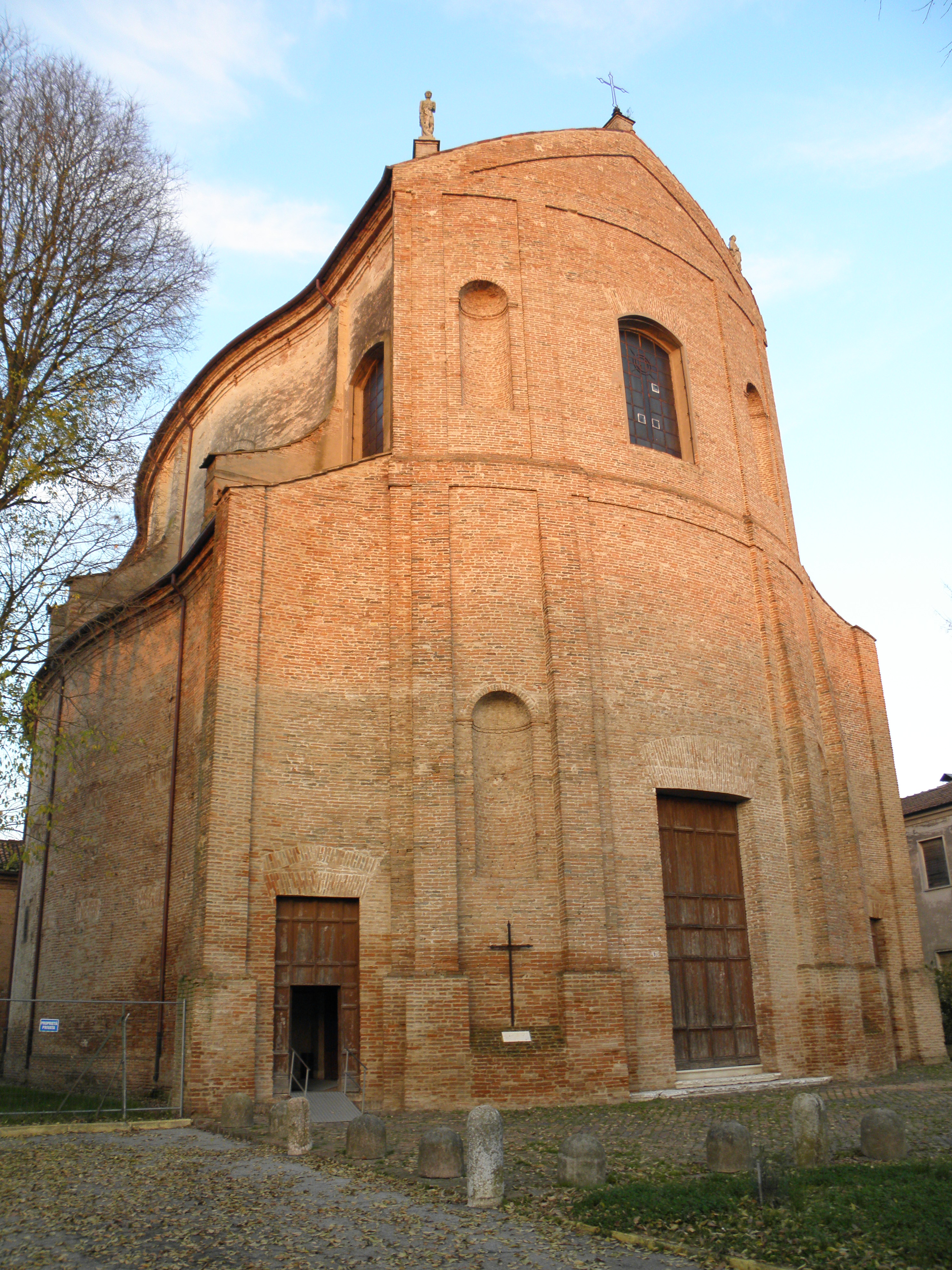

The Chiesa di San Giorgio Martire or Church of St George the Martyr is a Baroque-style, Roman Catholic parish church located in Via Verginese in the frazione of Gambulaga, north and within the town limits of Portomaggiore, in the province of Ferrara, region of Emilia-Romagna, Italy.

== History ==
A church was erected at the site of a former castle owned by the family of Adelardi Marchesella. The church was commissioned in 1777 by the local parish priest Don Francesco Marchini, and designed by Antonio Foschini. Work took seven years. The tall brick facade is notable for its convex layout with four empty niches. On the roofline are statues of two female saints. The interior has an oval layout with a rounded apse. At the entrance are two marble statues depicting Saints Peter and Paul. The main altarpiece at one time consisted of a triptych of Dosso Dossi depicting St George and the Dragon. A 19th-century copy is present in the sacristy. The interior was restored in the 1950s.
