= Amaury de Sévérac =

Marshal of France under Charles VII

- Occupation: Marshal of France

Sévérac coat of arms

Amaury, lord of Sévérac-le-Château, and Beaucaire of Chaudes-Aigues, was Marshal of France from 1422 to 1427.

He was the last of the first creation of the barons of Sévérac. He began a military career in Flanders under the command of his lord Count John III of Armagnac. In 1389 he then followed John who claimed the title of king of Majorca in Aragon where he was taken prisoner at the Battle of Navata.

After paying his ransom in 1390, Amaury re-established his position with John III of Armagnac and, with Francois d'Albret, led columns of the forces of the Grandes Compagnies de France (mercenary bands of brigands) in Lombardy. In July 1391 he was with John III at the Battle of Alessandria, when they unsuccessfully fought alongside his brother-in-law, Carlo Visconti, Count of Parma against a Milanese army sent by his ambitious cousin, the Duke of Milan, Gian Galeazzo Visconti.

Despite the death of John III in the battle Amaury stayed on to wage war in northern Italy on behalf of Parma and Florentines until 1395, when the Duke of Milan decided to pay him to leave. On his return to France, Amauy he joined and army gathered by the count of Valentinois, the bishop of Valencia and the Prince of Orange to exterminate surviving bands of Écorcheurs, armed ex-soldiers who lived by pillaging.

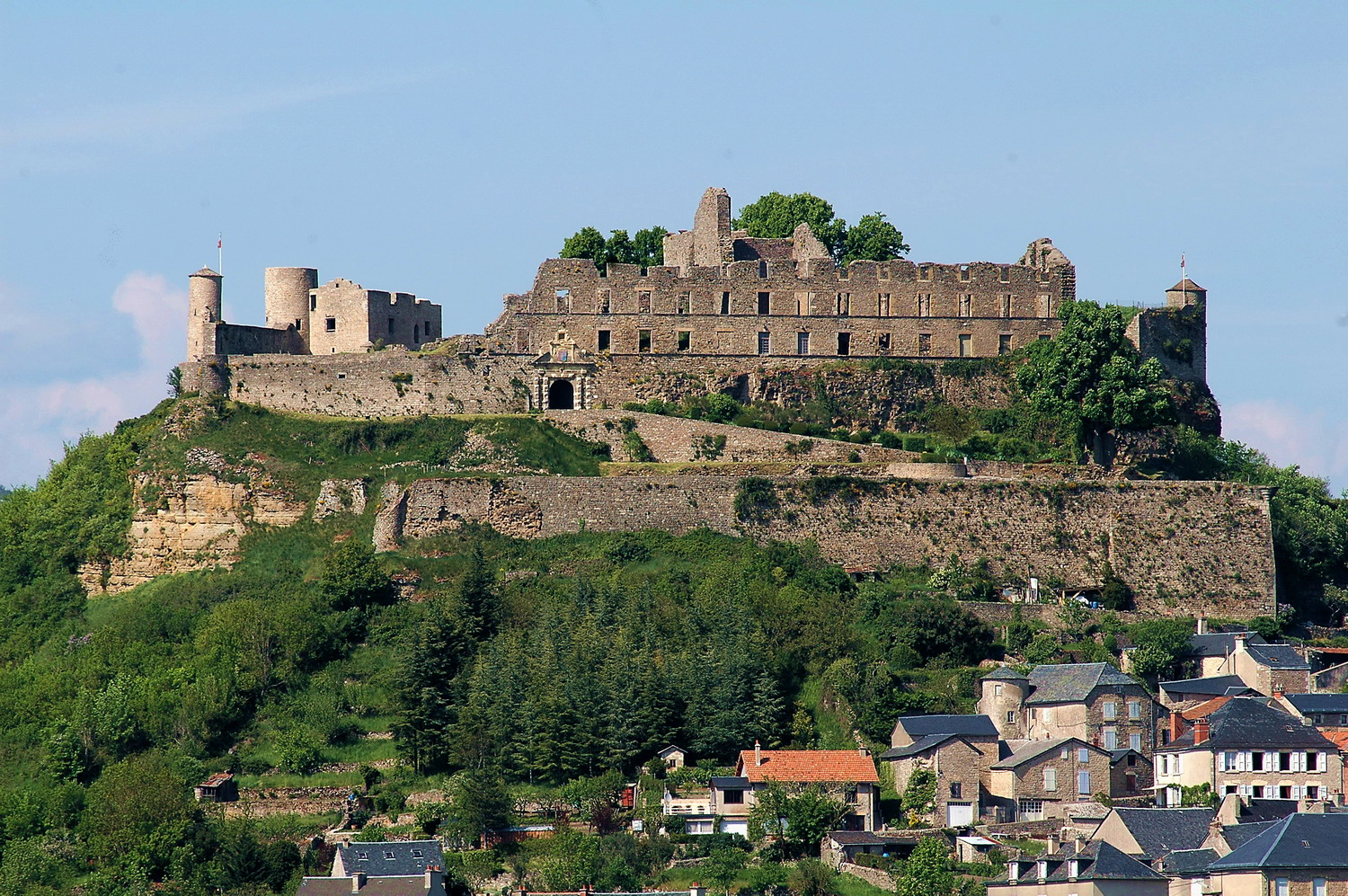
Chateau de severac.

Returning to Rouergue, Amaury tried to develop the local economy, starting the iron mine of Espeyrac, starting fairs and while taking part in the infighting between the Armagnac and Burgundians. He commanded the royal army at the Battle of Cravant in 1423, where he was defeated by the Anglo-Burgundians.

Raised to the rank of Marshal of France in 1424, he was appointed captain general for Lyonnais, Mâconnais and the Charolais. He had made a will in 1425 for the Count of Armagnac.
