= Company of the Rose =

Italian company of mercenaries

The Company of the Rose (Compagnia della Rosa) was a company of mercenary soldiers which operated in northern Italy in the 14th and 15th centuries.

It was founded in Bologna, Italy, in August 1398 by Giovanni da Buscareto and Bartolomeo Gonzaga. At the time of its formation, the Company of the Rose consisted mainly of Italians, made up of 1,000 knights and as many foot soldiers. It was employed to defend Bologna against Pino I Ordelaffi, Lord of Forlì, but were defeated by the latter in the vicinity of Forlì.

They continued in existence until 1404.
