= Routiers =

Medieval mercenaries

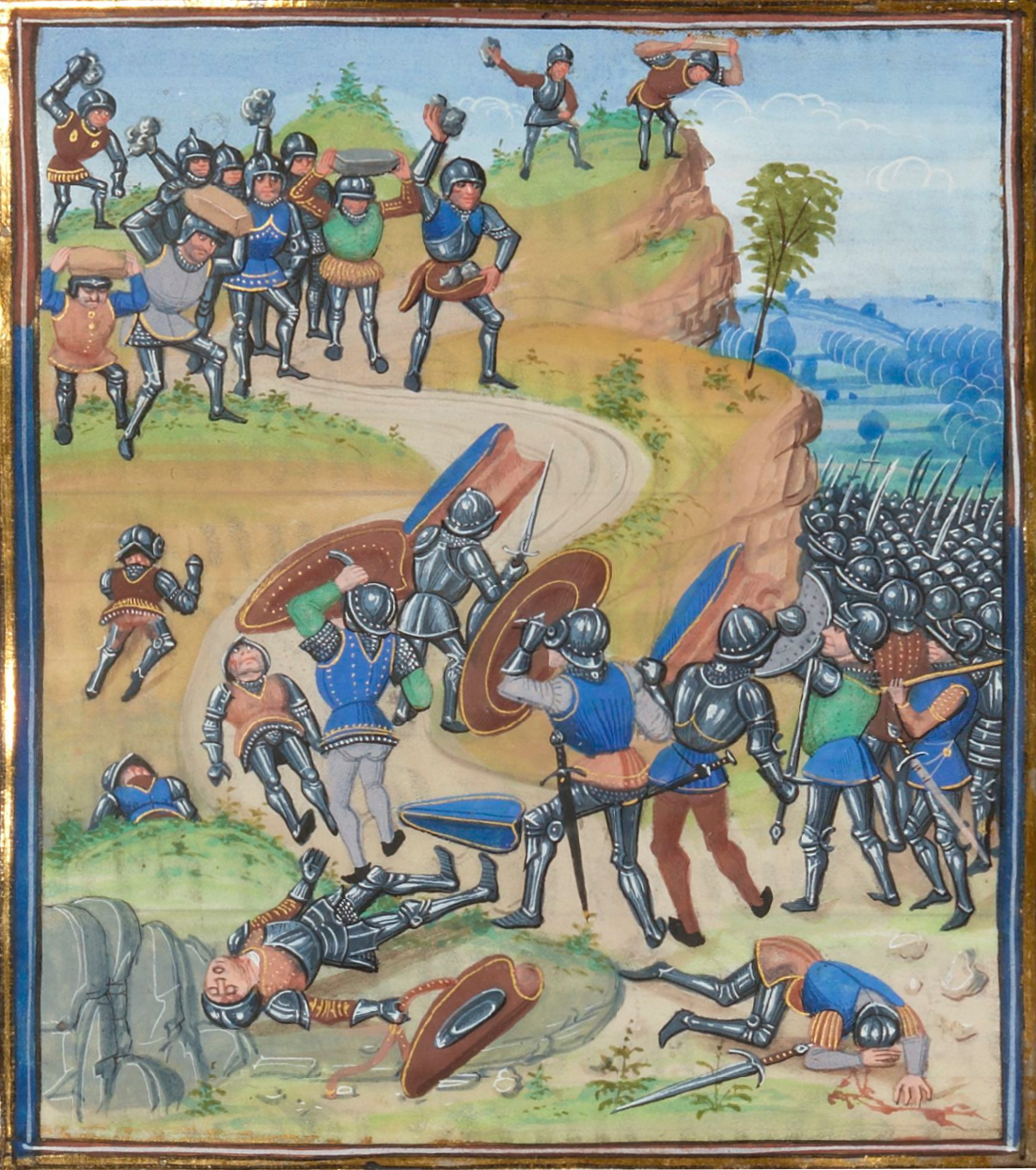

Routiers (French: [ʁutje]) were mercenary soldiers of the Middle Ages. Their particular distinction from other paid soldiers of the time was that they were organised into bands (rutta or routes). The term is first used in the 12th century but is particularly associated with free companies who terrorised the French countryside during the Hundred Years' War.

== Routiers of the 12th and 13th centuries ==
Although paid soldiers were known before the 12th century, the phenomenon of distinct bands (German Rotten, French routes) of mercenary soldiers, often mainly footsoldiers (spearmen, slingers, javelineers, archers and crossbowmen), appears to date from the mid 12th century. Exactly what distinguishes these mercenaries from simple paid soldiers is disputed by scholars but common elements include fighting for profit (as opposed to other reasons such as fealty or faith), a "foreignness" of coming from a different geographical area to that in which they were fighting, and that as members of a rutta, a company of soldiers hired for specific campaigns, routiers moved from contract to contract. Numerous different terms were used for these troops, some geographical (e.g. Brabançons from Brabant, Aragones from Aragon, Bascoli from the Basque country) and other nicknames (e.g. cotereaux or cotereli, perhaps from the knife they carried).

Mercenary bands were mainly seen in France, Aquitaine and Occitania but also Normandy, Iberia, England, and the lands of the Holy Roman Empire. They were noted for their lawlessness, with many complaints from the church about their depredations, leading to an explicit condemnation by the Third Lateran Council in 1179 and many efforts by the Papacy to eradicate or pacify them. Mercenary bands continued to be used but by the early 13th century they began to decline. While useful, they became increasingly unpopular. In England, not only was their brutality condemned, but the rise of mercenary leaders of lowly origins to high office caused friction within the nobility. King John's use of mercenaries in his civil wars led to condemnation and banishment of mercenaries in Magna Carta in 1215. Mercenary bands also fell from favour in France in the early 13th century, the end of the Albigensian Crusade and the beginning of a long period of domestic peace removing the context in which the routiers flourished.

== Routiers in the Hundred Years' War ==
The Hundred Years' War, which lasted from 1337 to 1453, was the backdrop to their pillaging. The Hundred Years' War was fought between two royal families over control of the French throne: the Plantagenets from England, and the House of Valois from France. The War, which is divided into three stages – the Edwardian War (1337–1360), the Caroline War (1369–1389), and the Lancastrian War (1415–1453) – saw the development of new tactics and weaponry that revolutionised warfare during that time period.

By 1348 the Black Death was tearing through Europe, England was bankrupt, and King Edward III was invading mainland France. In 1347 Edward besieged the city of Calais on the English Channel. Capturing Calais was a major strategic victory, which allowed the English to permanently keep troops in France. In 1356, King Edward III's son, the Black Prince, led a large band of routiers in his chavauchée, captured the French King John II at the Battle of Poitiers, and soon the French government began to fall apart.

=== Origins ===
The routiers' history can be traced back to a few years after the start of the Hundred Years' War, to Brittany in the early 1340s. No revenue was being generated from the revenues of the Duchy of Brittany for the English army, which meant that the army's soldiers had to live off the land. This "living off the land" began as simple freebooting, but quickly transformed into patis, or "ransoms of the country". A village near a garrison would usually be ransacked for any supplies. Subsequently, the village would be forced to pay the respective garrison for future protection.

This system soon caused much instability in the region for a few reasons. The patis system did not generate any revenue for the English cause but it made small fortunes for individual captains. These captains, whose income depended on controlling an area, rather than wages from the Duchy, were hard to control. While in theory, the King's Lieutenant could rely on his garrisons in time of war, they were scarcely enthusiastic combatants. Furthermore, garrisons that were stationed in fringe territories were subject to boredom, which was relieved by random brutality. That state, coupled with the fact that they were surrounded by hostile inhabitants, caused a lot of animosity between the peasants and soldiers, which in a few instances led to skirmishes and made the task of governing the Duchy harder.

The problem was not confined to Brittany. The Château de Lusignan was a fortress near Poitiers captured by the Earl of Lancaster in September 1346. When the Earl withdrew from the area he left a garrison under the command of Bertrand de Montferrand. Many of his troops were men with questionable pasts: criminals and misfits. Despite a truce between 1346 and 1350, the garrison laid waste to over fifty parishes and ten monasteries, and destroyed towns and castles throughout southern Poitou. In May 1347, a French force was sent to recapture the fortress but was ambushed by the garrison and forced to retreat.

=== Nature of the Companies ===
==== Geographical origins ====
Routiers were usually referred to as "Englishmen" in France, but they were actually composed for the most part by Gascons, after the name of the region of what is now South-West France in which they resided. But the Gascons were considered then as a distinct people from the French. The full demographic that filled the ranks of the routiers included Spaniards, Germans, English, and Frenchmen. Although there had been major raiding campaigns led by English noblemen such as the Prince of Wales, many individual routes were led by Gascon officers. Kenneth Fowler has examined the origins of 166 named captains. Ninety-one of these were involved in the Great Companies. 36 were English, 26 from Aquitane, 19 were Gascons, five from Béarn and five from Germany. In addition to these, there was a group of 45 Breton captains and a further group from Navarre.

==== Organisation ====
Unlike the earlier routiers companies, the routes of the Hundred Years' War were primarily mounted forces. Their main fighting men were men-at-arms, sometimes accompanied by mounted infantry including mounted archers. For example, the companies operating around Auvergne in September 1363 were estimated at 2,000 lances of men-at-arms and 1,000 mounted infantry. In addition, the companies could be accompanied by groups of pillagers. A route operating around Beaune in September 1364 were numbered as 120 "good lances", 100 other combatants "not including pillagers", suggesting these last were not considered as militarily significant. Larger companies of routiers could be surprisingly well organised. They each had a command structure with a staff that even included secretaries to collect and disperse their loot. A few of the groups had their own uniforms, such as the notorious Bandes Blanches of the Archpriest Arnaud de Cervole.

=== Examples of routiers ===
John Hawkwood is the most famous of the English routiers. Beginning as a routier, he ultimately spent three decades as a mercenary captain in Italy.

== Bibliography ==
- Seward, Desmond, The Hundred Years War. The English in France 1337–1453, Penguin Books, 1999, ISBN 0-14-028361-7
- Sumption, Jonathan, The Hundred Years War I: Trial by Battle, University of Pennsylvania Press, September 1999, ISBN 0-8122-1655-5

== See also ==
- Mercadier
- Free company
- Écorcheurs
