= Azzo X d'Este =

Italian condottiero

Azzo X d'Este (1344–1415) was an Italian condottiero, a member of the House of Este.

Born into a cadet branch of the family, he contested the seigniory of Ferrara to the young Niccolò III, an illegitimate son of marquess Alberto d'Este who was under the protection of Pope Boniface IX and Venice. After a failed attempt to poison him, Azzo created a compagnia of mercenaries, with the support of some Este vassals. However, his invasions of the Ferrara territory were crushed by Azzo da Castello, and he retired to the Modenese.

With the help of Giovanni da Barbiano and an army of 8,000 men, in 1395 he tried again the capture of Ferrara, taking advantage of da Castello's death. But he was again heavily defeated at the Battle of Portomaggiore (16 April), this time by a Venetian army, and imprisoned. Later he was exiled to Candia (Crete).

He died in Venice in 1415.
