= William Caferro =

American historian

William Caferro is Gertrude Conaway Vanderbilt Professor of History & Professor of Classical and Mediterranean Studies at Vanderbilt University. His expertise is in medieval and Renaissance European history. His publications synthesize economic, military, social, literary, and historical trends.

In 2023, Caferro was elected as a fellow of the Medieval Academy of America. Caferro was awarded a Guggenheim Fellowship (2010) by the John Simon Guggenheim Memorial Foundation. He has also held fellowships from Villa I Tatti (Harvard Center for Renaissance Studies), the Institute for Advanced Study (Princeton), the Italian Academy for Advanced Study (Columbia University) and the John Simon Guggenheim Memorial Foundation. He is currently a member of the Deputazione di Storia Patria di Toscana and l'Associazione di Studi Storici Elio Conti in Italy.

He received his bachelor's degree from Haverford College in 1984 and a doctorate from Yale University in 1992.

== Published works ==
Books

- Caferro, William (1998). Mercenary Companies and the Decline of Siena. Johns Hopkins University Press. ISBN 978-0801857881
- Jacks, Philip and William Caferro (2001). "The Spinelli of Florence: Fortunes of a Renaissance Merchant Family." Penn State University Press. ISBN 978-0271019246.
- Caferro, William (2006). John Hawkwood: An English Mercenary in Fourteenth-Century Italy. Johns Hopkins University Press. ISBN 978-0801883231.
- Caferro, William (2017), Editor. The Routledge History of Renaissance Europe New York and London: Routledge Press. ISBN 978-1138898851
- Caferro, William (2010). Contesting the Renaissance. Wiley-Blackwell. ISBN 978-1405123709.
- Caferro, William (2018). Petrarch's War: Florence and the Black Death in Context. Cambridge University Press. ISBN 978-1108424011

Selected Articles

- Caferro, William (1994). "City and Countryside in Siena in the Second Half of the Fourteenth Century". The Journal of Economic History 54(1): 85-103.
- Caferro, William (1996). "The silk business of Tommaso Spinelli, fifteenth-century Florentine merchant and papal banker". Renaissance Studies 10(4): 417-439.
- Caferro, William (1996). "Italy and the Companies of Adventure in the Fourteenth Century". The Historian 58(4): 794-810.
- Caferro, William (1996). “L'Attività bancaria papale e la Firenze del Rinascimento. Il caso di Tommaso Spinelli,” Società e storia 55: 717-753.
- Caferro, Wiiliam (2008). “Continuity, Long-Term Service and Permanent Forces: A Reassessment of the Florentine Army in the Fourteenth Century,” The Journal of Modern History 80: 303-32.
- Caferro, William (2008). “Warfare and Economy in Renaissance Italy, 1350-1450,” Journal of Interdisciplinary History 39: 167-209.
- Caferro, William (2008). “Tommaso Spinelli, the Soul of a Banker,” Journal of the Historical Society 8.2: 303-322.
- Caferro, William (2013). “Petrarch’s War: Florentine Wages at the Time of the Black Death” Speculum 88.1: 144-16
- Caferro, William (2013). “Edward Despenser, The Green Knight and the Lance Formation: Englishmen in Florentine Military Service” in The Hundred Years War, part III, edited by L. J. Andrew Villalon and Donald Kagay (Leiden: Brill): 85-104.
- Caferro, William (2014). “Dante, Byzantium and the Italian Chronicle Tradition” in Dante and the Greeks, edited by Jan Ziolkowski. Harvard University Press: 227-245.
- Caferro, William (2017). “Dante, Riccobaldo and Empire,” Dante Studies 135: 135-155.
- Caferro, William (2018). “The Visconti War and Boccaccio’s Florentine Public Service in Context, 1351-1353,” Heliotropia 15: 161-182.

== Awards ==
- 2002 Madison Sarratt Prize for Excellence in Undergraduate Teaching (Vanderbilt)"People".
- 2008 Medieval Institute, Otto Grundler Book Prize
- 2010 Guggenheim Fellow
- 2016 Vanderbilt University, Award for Excellence in Graduate Teaching
- 2023 Fellow of the Medieval Academy of America
