= White Company =

European free company

The White Company (Italian: Compagnia Bianca del Falco) was a European free company active during the 14th century. Initially known as the Great Company of English and Germans, it was later commonly referred to as the English Company (Italian: Compagnia degli Inglesi; Latin: Societas Angliciis). The company arrived in Italy in 1361, led first by the German mercenary Albert Sterz and later by the Englishman John Hawkwood, under whom it gained its greatest notoriety.

The White Company operated as a structured military organization, maintaining an administrative staff of chancellors, notaries, and treasurers, and entering into legally binding contracts known as condotte with the city-states and the papacy that employed it. Despite this organizational structure, the company was also characterized by widespread pillaging, extortion, and violence. It is credited with introducing to Italy the practice of dismounting men-at-arms in battle, a tactic already established in the Hundred Years' War. The company ceased to exist as an operational unit following its defeat by the Company of the Star in November 1364.

== Overview ==
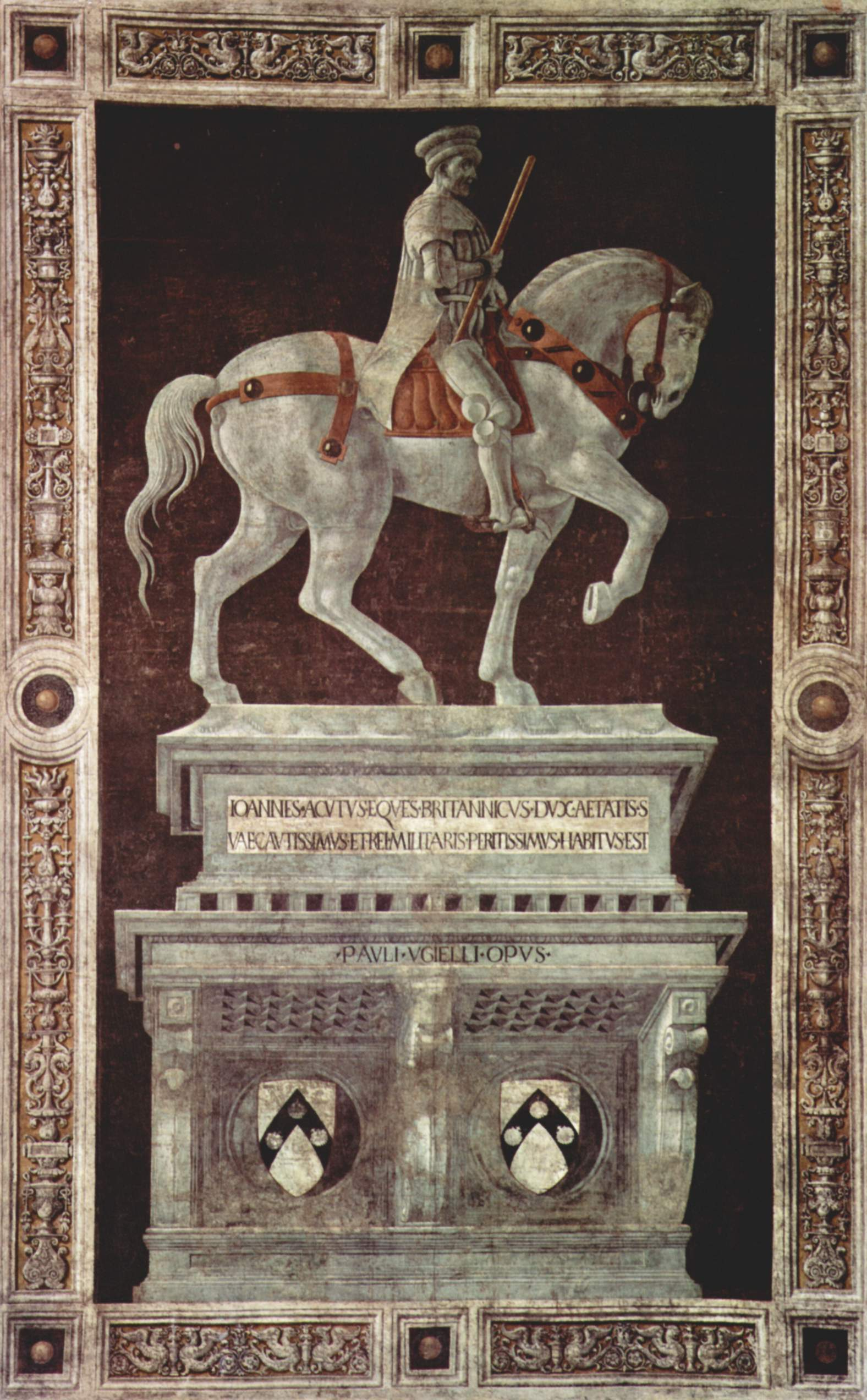
Funerary Monument to Sir John Hawkwood (1436), fresco on canvas by Paolo Uccello

The White Company (Compagnia Bianca del Falco) was a European free company (Compagnia di ventura) active during the 14th century. Free companies were highly organized mercenary groups that operated as armies for hire in medieval Europe from the 12th to 14th centuries, unaffiliated with any government. The White Company was led from its arrival in Italy in 1361 to 1363 by the German mercenary Albert Sterz and later by the Englishman John Hawkwood. Although the White Company is the name by which it is popularly known, it was initially called the Great Company of English and Germans and would later often be referred to as the English Company (Italian: Compagnia degli Inglesi, Latin: Societas Angliciis). Contrary to the popular media counterpart from Sir Arthur Conan Doyle, historian William Caferro describes the White Company as a violent band of thieves, ravagers, and rapists while also making a point to show that the White Company still acted as a completely structured entity, with an administrative staff of chancellors, notaries, and treasurers.

== Arrival in Italy ==
Prior to the Hundred Years' War, many free companies had already found success operating in Italy which has been attributed to a lasting impact of global disparities like the Plague, as well as Italy's large-scale separation into small independent city states. While these city states were not weak or uniquely poor, their small population made supporting a standing army impossible. Following the signing of the treaty of Brétigny on May 8, 1360 Italy saw an increase of English and French free companies cross the Alps in search of employment. This new wave of mercenaries included the newly established White Company. Even though free companies were in increasing demand, they were not constantly under contract. This, connected with the dramatic increase of companies, led to an increase of pillaging as a form of income from these soldiers.

== Combat Composition ==
Despite it being commonly referred to as the English Company, personnel were drawn from a wide range of nationalities, reflecting the international nature of Italian mercenary warfare in the 14th century, including at various times Germans, Italians and Hungarians but mostly English and French veterans of the Hundred Years' War. The number of men in the company varied over the years. In 1361, it is recorded as having 3,500 cavalry and 2,000 infantry. The company was organised in lances of three men; a man-at-arms, a squire and a page. Of these, only the man-at-arms and squire were armed. The identities of these men are not able to be confirmed by historians due to the practice of soldiers who had committed crimes assuming new names and joining free companies.These lances were organised into contingents, each under a corporal, who was often an independent sub-contractor. The company contained numbers of infantry, particularly English longbowmen.

== Administrative Structure ==
From an administrative stance, the White Company operated under a similar structure to many other free companies of the same nature. The troops of the company would be paid by the treasurer. One of The White Company's treasurer was an Englishman, William Thornton. The treasurer would disperse funds as decided through the agreement in the condotta; the official term for the legally binding payment agreement which was signed by the company leader and the hiring city-state or pope. In the condotta as well was often a menda clause, which was a financial insurance mechanism requiring the employing entity to compensate individual soldiers in the result of expensive equipment being stolen or heavily damaged, often including their horses. Finance arrangements often began with a prestito, or down payment, delivered upon the signing of the condotta. However, this term frequently overlapped with the practice of extortion, as they often demanded such payments in exchange for a promise of non aggression against the very cities that employed them. These contracts also had personal clauses for the soldiers themselves, William Caferro makes a note that all of the English soldiers who were under contract had a written clause that they would not, and would not have to attack any Englishman, or city with any connection to the English country or the Crown. While scholars note that the company is often seen as wealthy from prior success, it is commonly noted that this success might not be in the same structured system noted so far. Instead much of the financial gain came from pillaging, not only those who they were sent to attack but also their employers and anyone else. The finances of the White Company introduce a type of paper currency. William Caferro highlights a shift in fiscal exchange by noting that during John Hawkwood's employment a gold and silver shortage was heavily affecting Italy which led the city of Siena to pay him using lettere di cambio, or bills of exchange, in order to settle a 4,000 florin debt.

== Origins of the name ==
It was originally a part of the Great Company during its short operation north of the Alps, however began to operate on its own under the name the White Company, because there were two other companies recorded operating using the title of The Great Company. The Great Company name became an additional alias later on with the addition of "of the English and Germans". William Caferro has suggested that the alternative name the Great Company of the English and Germans is a reference to the nationality of its two most famous leaders, John Hawkwood and Albert Sterz. No medieval sources explain origin of the name, the White Company, although many reference it. The traditional view is that it is a reference to the brightly polished armour of the men-at-arms. However, William Caferro has also suggested that it was because the company originally wore white surcoats. A Florentine chronicler Filippo Villani stated that the soldiers of the White Company were strong and fierce like a lion while also clever and cunning like a fox, ultimately attaching the common Tuscan metaphor, the lion and the fox, to the company.

== Tactics ==
The White Company is credited with introducing to Italy the practice of dismounting men-at-arms in battle, a practice already commonplace in the battles of the Hundred Years' War in France. Contemporary witnesses record that the company fought dismounted and in close order, advancing with two men-at-arms holding the same lance at a slow pace while shouting loud battle cries. The longbowmen apparently drew up behind. This is not to suggest that they abandoned mounted combat altogether. William Caferro highlights the company's ability to deploy and attack at night in order to catch the defensive army off guard. They are also noted in their ability to scale walls in order to enter fortified towns. They used scaling ladders made out of small sections that could be fitted together to any length. Caferro cites chroniclers who would praise the army's ability to go through extreme weather and travel excessive distances quickly. The White Company was also known for breaking up into smaller units to make movement easier and maximise their area of target. Caferro brings up their use of raids in which they would purposely burn farm land and crops to inflict economic damage as well as their physical violence. It is also important to note that their military tactics weren't always professional as their violence would often go beyond what was typical.

== Battles ==
The White Company was involved in the following battles:

- Battle of Canturino 1363
- First Battle of Cascina 1364

== End of the company ==
The end of the White Company was an interesting period of just under a year. In the spring of 1364, John Hawkwood was promoted to captain while the company was in service to the Pisan government. During this employment the Florentines managed to bribe the armies operating for the Pisans which included the White Company and their German allies. This halted their attack leading to the German company leaving as well as many of the English soldiers. It was at this point when former captain Albert Sterz left the White Company to form his own, the Company of the Star. In November 1364, the White Company faced the Company of the Star and ultimately lost. While it is unconfirmed and only written about by one chronicler, the victory may be credited to the German use of hand-bombards, which were primitive handguns officially used in the fifteenth century. After this defeat the company dwindled in size until it was no longer operational. Many of the soldiers, including John Hawkwood continued to operate in Italy; sometimes even under the same name, however this company itself no longer existed.

== Popular culture ==
The White Company is the title of a novel by Sir Arthur Conan Doyle which is very loosely based on the historical company. Unlike the historical company, the main focus of the action is in Spain and the White Company led by Bertrand de Guesclin to Spain in 1366 was also an inspiration. The book was popular as an adventure novel, its well-chosen title raising the profile of the historical company among a lay readership.

The Band of the Hawk, the mercenary company led by Griffith in the Japanese manga Berserk by Kentaro Miura, is based on John Hawkwood and the White Company.

The Black Company by Glen Cook is another series that takes inspiration from the White Company.

White Company also appears as a playable mercenary company in Corvus Belli Infinity setting a miniature skirmish wargame.

== See also ==
- Condottiero
