= Astorre I Manfredi =

Italian condottiero

Astorre Manfredi (c. 1345 – 28 November 1405) was an Italian condottiero. He was the son of Giovanni Manfredi, who had been lord of Faenza (today's Emilia-Romagna) and other castles in the area before the Papal reconquest. Astorre lived for a while in Pistoia after his father had lost his last possession in Romagna; three years after the latter's death, in 1375, he managed to recover Granarolo.

== Military career ==
In 1377, he reconquered Faenza, then occupied by the Este, with the help of his brother Francesco and the Ordelaffis, Lords of Forlì. To obtain the money to keep his seignory, he formed a Compagnia di Ventura (mercenary band), called Compagnia della Stella (Company of the Star). Barnabò Visconti hired him to attack Genoa, but when that city paid him 13,000 florins, he moved back; when he tried again to assault the city, his troops were ambushed in the Bisagno valley and badly defeated. Astorre himself barely escaped being taken as a prisoner.

In the meantime, his brother Francesco has attempted to attain power in Faenza, and Astorre imprisoned him in the castle of Solarolo. Later, Astorre was at the service of Bologna in the war against Gian Galeazzo Visconti of Milan. His deeds gained him the praise of the Bolognesi, who gave him the palace in the city that still bears his name.

In the Battle of Portomaggiore (16 April 1395), he defeated the Ferrarese rebel Azzo d'Este, whom he kept as a prisoner in Faenza in the following year. His excessive pretences, however, pushed Niccolò III d'Este, lord of Ferrara, to capture his son Gian Galeazzo, who was later exchanged with Azzo.

In 1400, the possession of the castle of Solarolo caused a war against Giovanni I Bentivoglio, the Papal vicar of Bologna, who had hired the famous Alberico da Barbiano. The outnumbered Astorre could only get help from the Pope, and in 1404, Faenza and all his territories were returned to the Papal States. After a period as a condottiero under the Papal banners, he was captured when allegedly planning to regain Faenza through a revolt. He was condemned to death and executed in the main square of his city in 1405.

Preceded by Niccolò III d'Este	Lord of Faenza; 1377–1404	Succeeded by To the Papal States
