= Malerba (condottiero) =

14th C. German mercenary leader in Italy

Rinaldo Giver, known as Malerba (in German Reinhold von Giver), died 1345, was a German or Swiss condottiero.

== Name ==
Il Malerba was the nom de guerre of a German or Swiss soldier, Reinhold von Giver or Raynolds von Givres und Malerba or Rainald Frenz, and is often referred to as Rinaldo Giver in the Italian chronicles of the period. The name may have been based on the Italian word for invasive plant or weed. (Similarly, Philip of Sulz, a German cavalryman, called himself Malispiritas.)

== Military career ==
He appears to have arrived in Italy as part of the army which Louis the Bavarian brought with him in 1327 to claim the imperial crown of the Holy Roman Empire.

In general it suited the Italian princes to have Germans in their pay rather than nationals, as language differences made them a less political threat. The blood of their citizens was spared and war was waged with less ferocity, because the combatants were almost all compatriots, and had no cause for hatred against one another. After a victory, the vanquished were stripped of their weapons and their horses, and then sent away without ransom.

Malerba is first seen in the service of Florence in the war against the Veronese militia led by Mastino II della Scala.

In early 1338 about 3,000 German cavalrymen (known as barbute due to their helmets) were released from Mastino's service at Vicenza and, under the leadership of Malerba, hired themselves out to Lodrisio Visconte to plunder Milan. He is recorded as the leader of Helvetian and Raetian forces of the Compagnia di San Giorgio, which took part in the Battle of Parabiago. Although the condottieri won the initial battle, they were so weakened that they succumbed to a counter attack by Milan force of 700 cavalry led by Hector de Panigo. On crossing the Olona river on his way back to Milan, de Panigo met Malerba and his force who had been positioned to cut off the retreat of any fugitives. In the last engagement of the day, Malerba was defeated and the Company of St. George was scattered.

In March, he was hired by Azzone Visconti, but four months later he passed into the service of the Valperga family, who entrusted him with the command of 300 cavalrymen to attack and plunder the territories in fief of the prince of Savoy-Acaia.

Quæ gens pulcra fuit, & tota Theutonica.

— Pietro Azario "Cronicon"
Translation:

These people were fair, and completely Teutonic.

He destroyed and plundered several localities in the Turin area but was unable to penetrate enemy territory because he was blocked by the troops of the margrave John II of Montferrat. In the autumn of 1340, he entered the service of the margrave of Montferrat.

In 1342, Malerba was with the Great Company of Guarnieri d'Urslingen, with which he fought against Florence. He dared to go to into Florence disguised as a monk to spy on their preparations and was caught and taken prisoner by Gualtieri di Brienne, mayor of the Tuscan city. He was subsequently freed and joined Urslingen in Romagna.

The Pepoli family had taken over Bologna as a result of the conflict between Guelfs and Ghibellines. Their opponents gradually appeared in Urslingen's camp and promised to reward him if he would drive Taddeo Pepoli and his sons out of the city and restore it as a republic. A force of Bologna republicans occupied the castle of Laterina, near Arezzo, awaiting the rest of the Great Company but became trapped. Malerba is noted as one of the leaders attempting to relieve them.

In 1344, he went into the service of the Church to fight against the Ottomans. He went to Turkey at the head of 25 knights and joined the Venetian militia led by Piero Zeno and the Genoese militia led by Martino Zaccaria. In 1345, the city of Izmir was taken from the Turks, who then attacked the church of St. John, where Malerba and 40 other knights were attending a mass celebrated by the Patriarch of the Knights of Jerusalem, Friar Manuel Camosini. He was killed and beheaded. According to another version, he was captured and mauled by the Turks.

== Sources ==
- Azario, Pietro (1861). Chronicon de gestis principal vicecomitum (in Latin). Milan: Fredericum Angelus.
- Bronner, Franz Xaver (1828). Abenteuerliche Geschichte Herzog Werners von Urslingen (in German). Aarau: Sauerländer.
- Damiani, Roberto (2012). "Malerba". Note biografiche di Capitani di Guerra e di Condottieri di ventura operanti in Italia tra il 1330 e il 1550 (in Italian).
- Kortüm, Friedrich (1836). Die Geschichte des Mittelalters [The History of the Middle Ages] (in German). Vol. 2. Bern: C. A. Jenni, Sohn.
- Mallett, Michael (2009). Mercenaries and Their Masters. Barnsley: Pen & Sword Military. ISBN 9781848840317.
- Muratorii, Lodovico Antonio (1729). "Chronicon Estense". Scriptriptores rerum Italicarum (in Latin). Vol. 15. Mediolanum (Milan).
- Ricotti, Ercole (1845). "Le prime Compagnie Tedesche A. 1327 - 1343.". Storia delle compagnie di ventura in Italia (in Italian). Vol. II. Turin: Giuseppe Pomba e C. Editori.
- Rogers, Clifford J., ed. (2010). "Parabiago, Battle of". The Oxford Encyclopedia of Medieval Warfare and Military Technology. Oxford: Oxford University Press. ISBN 9780195334036.
- Sismondi (1818). Histoire des républiques Italiennes du Moyen Age (in French). Vol. 5. Paris: Treuttel & Würtz.
