= Visconti Castle (Crenna) =

Medieval and revival castles Gallarate, Lombardy, Italy

- Castello Visconteo di Crenna
- Crenna (Gallarate), Lombardy, Northern Italy
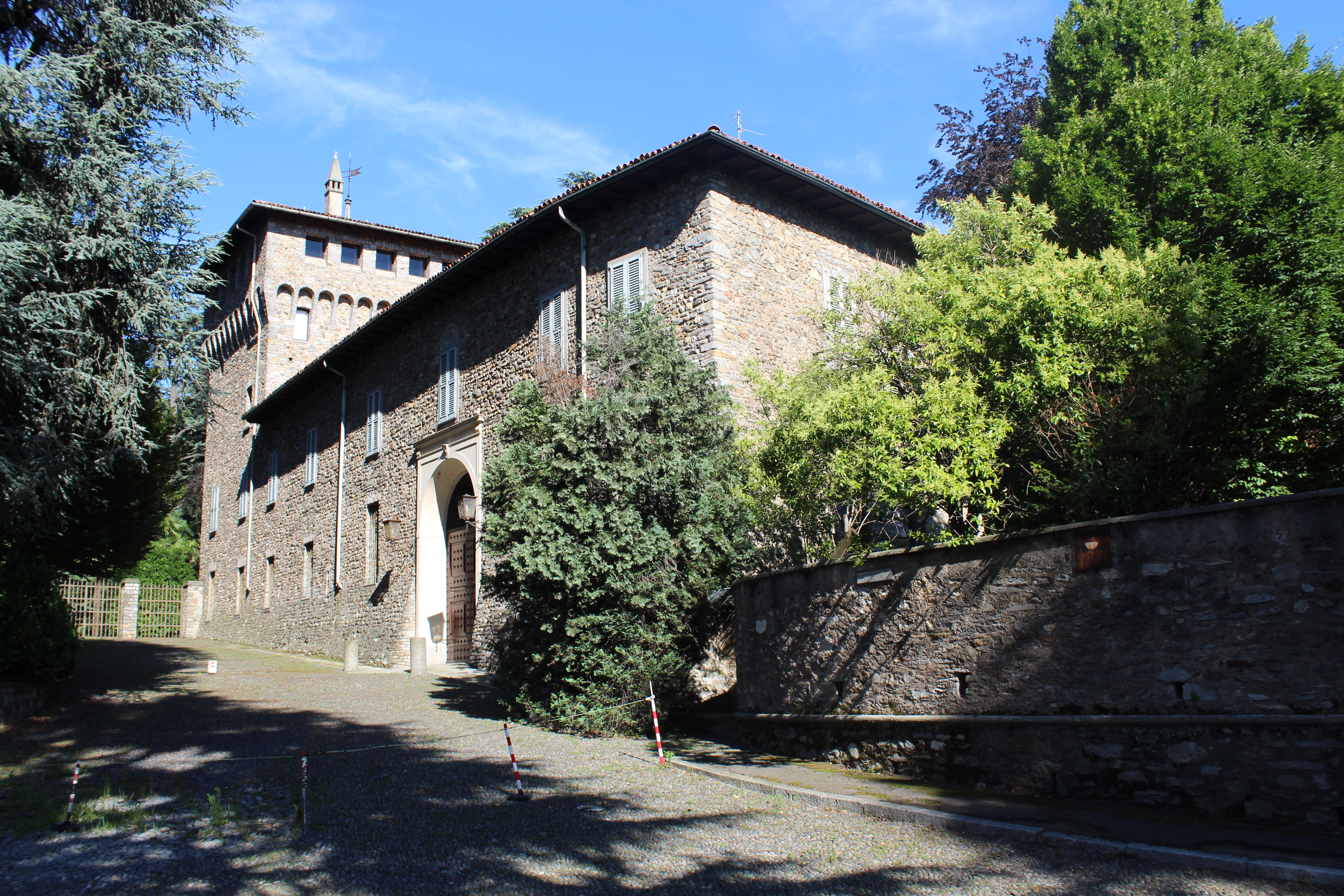
- One of the buildings in the area of the Crenna castle

Site information
- Type: Medieval castle, Revival castle
- Owner: Private
- Open to the public: No
- Condition: Good

Location
- Coordinates: 45°40′19″N 8°47′03″E

Site history
- Built: 12th-14th centuries, 18-19th centuries (adaptations and revival castles)
- Built by: Unknown, expanded by Lodrisio Visconti
- Events: Rebellion of Lodrisio Visconti against his cousins, lords of Milan (1322–1339)

The Visconti Castle of Crenna is a castle of medieval origin located in Crenna, district of Gallarate, Lombardy, Northern Italy. It is linked to the fame of Lodrisio Visconti, who raised against and then reconciled with the family members of his cousin Matteo Visconti, Lord of Milan. In the 14th century, the castle underwent expansion and destruction according to the alternative fortunes of Lodrisio.

Since the 19th century, a group of private estates, also in the revival castle form, have been constructed near the original building, characterizing the area today.

== Location ==
The Visconti Castle is located on the top of a hill over the valley of the Arno torrent. The position favors the control of the territory to the east toward Milan. The location is believed to be at the origin of the initial settlements and fortifications.

== History ==
The castle is mentioned for the first time in the 12th-century sources. At the end of the 13th century, it was received by Pietro Visconti with other nearby castles (Besnate, Orago, and Jerago) as part of a division between him and Matteo and Uberto, sons of Teobaldo Visconti. In the neighboring Gallarate, Teobaldo, after being captured by members of the opposite faction supporting the Della Torre family, was executed in 1276.

The castle was inherited by Lodrisio, son of Pietro, who greatly expanded it. In the meantime, his cousin Matteo became Lord of Milan. After the death of Matteo in 1322, a conflict arose between his sons and Lodrisio. Lodrisio was dislodged from Crenna, and the castle was destroyed. After putting together the Compagnia di San Giorgio, a militia of mercenaries, in 1339, he was finally defeated in the Battle of Parabiago by an army led by Azzone, grandson of Matteo. Lodrisio later reconciled with their cousins, and the castle was subsequently restored.

The castle was later transferred to the Visconti di Crenna, the Visconti cadet branch originated by Lodrisio and named after Crenna. Over several generations, divisions among brothers led to the fragmentation of the area surrounding the castle. The building underwent changes and adaptations in the 16th and 17th centuries after further family divisions. New buildings, in the form of revival castles, were later added.

The Visconti di Crenna became extinct in 1722, and the buildings were transferred consequently to other families.

== Today ==
After the transformation of the late 19th and the first decades of the 20th century, the ancient castle's area is today surrounded by recent buildings. A tower and other revival caste constructions are visible from the center of Crenna. The eastern façade of the castle, looking toward Gallarate, can be seen from afar at the top of the Crenna hill.

== Sources ==
- Conti, Flavio; Hybsch, Vincenzo; Vincenti, Antonello (1991). I castelli della Lombardia. Provincie di Como, Sondrio e Varese (in Italian). Novara: Istituto Geografico de Agostini. ISBN 9788840293783. OCLC 1283309593.
- Del Tredici, Federico; Rossetti, Edoardo (2012). Castle trails from Milan to Bellinzona - Guide to the dukedom's castles. Milan: Nexi-Castelli del ducato. ISBN 9788896451069. OCLC 955635027. Archived from the original on July 13, 2024.
- Mallett, Michael (2009). Mercenaries and their Masters: Warfare in Renaissance Italy. Barnsley, South Yorkshire: Pen & Sword Military. ISBN 9781848840317. OCLC 1848840314.
- Muir, Dorothy (1924). A history of Milan under the Visconti. London: Methuen & Co. Ltd. OCLC 1627896.
- Litta Biumi, Pompeo (1819–1884). Visconti di Milano. Famiglie celebri italiane (in Italian). Milano: Luciano Basadonna Editore. OCLC 777242652.
