= Great Company (German) =

14th-century German mercenary group

The Great Company was a group of mercenaries, chiefly of German origin but operating in the Italian peninsula, who flourished in the mid-14th century. At its height, the company numbered approximately 10,000-12,000 men, chiefly armored cavalry. The Great Company's power set the pattern for later condottieri who came to dominate Renaissance Italian warfare.

== History ==
=== 1340s ===
The company was founded in 1342 by Werner von Urslingen, whose reputed motto was "Enemy of God, Enemy of Piety, Enemy of Pity", with some writers even reporting the phrase inscribed on his breastplate. Urslingen was inspired by Lodrisio Visconti's Compagnia di San Giorgio, under which he had fought in the battle of Parabiago. Commanders included his brother Reinhardt, Ettore da Panigo, Konrad von Landau and Francesco II Ordelaffi. The strength of the company at this point was recorded as 3,000 men-at-arms. In autumn 1342, the company was dissolved and Urslingen and many of his German followers returned home.

In 1347 Urslingen was hired by King Louis I of Hungary in his war with Queen Joanna of Naples. Here he was reunited with his old comrade Konrad von Landau and served for the first time with the Provençal knight, Montreal d'Albarno, known as Fra' Moriale. The Company won a major victory at the Battle of Meleto in 1349. The company then split again, with Urslingen and Landau operating in central Italy while Fra Moriale stayed in Naples.

=== 1350s ===
In 1351 Urslingen retired to Germany and Landau and Fra' Moriale reunited, the latter taking command of the company, which now added Italians, Provençals and Hungarians to the previous mainly German majority of mercenaries. The major area of operation was once more central Italy. In 1353–54, the company's strength was estimated at 10,000 fighting men and 20,000 camp followers. In 1354, Fra' Moriale was arrested and executed in Rome and Konrad von Landau became commander-in-chief. The company signed on with the Venetian League in 1358 and the following year with Siena, during which time it suffered not only an ambush in the mountains at Le Scalelle on the way to Siena but a serious setback at the hands of Florence when they had to ransom their commander.

In 1359 the company had again reached a substantial strength, amounting to some 20,000 men; it subsequently fought in battles against Rimini, Fabriano, Camerino, the Papal States and Florence. In July the company was crushed by the Florentine army under Pandolfo II Malatesta at the Battle of Campo delle Mosche.

=== 1360s ===
In 1363, hired by the Visconti of Milan, it fought against Albert Sterz's White Company, which the Great Company had defeated the previous year and which had been hired by the Marquis of Montferrat. In April, after three months of clashes, the Great Company was decisively defeated at the Battle of Canturino and Konrad von Landau himself was killed.

== See also ==
- Condottieri
- Free company
