= Konrad von Landau =

Konrad Wirtinger von Landau (died 22 April 1363), known in Italy as Conte Lando, was a German military adventurer and condottiero who was active in north and central Italy.

He was born the eldest son of Count Eberardo III in the ancient Swabian village of Burg Landau near Ertingen in present-day Württemberg and held the title of Konrad II, Count of Landau.

He went to Italy in 1338, entered the service of the Lords of Venice and fought against the army of Verona led by Mastino II della Scala. In 1339 he joined the Compagnia di San Giorgio of Lodrisio Visconti to attack Milan, then under the control of Lodrisio's estranged brothers. After initial success, their company was defeated at the Battle of Parabiago. In 1346, fighting for Venice against Milan, he was again on the losing side. In 1347, in the service of the Marquis of Saluzzo, when attempting to counter the attack by the Milanese and the Marquis of Montferrat, he was forced to surrender to the enemy.

In 1348 he joined the Great Company of Werner von Urslingen and took part in an expedition sponsored by King Louis I of Hungary into Naples against Joanna I of Naples to avenge the killing of Louis's brother Andrew by the Neapolitans. In 1349 they won the Battle of Meleto against the Neapolitan barons which earned the company some 500,000 florins in booty and ransoms. He then spent the next few years fighting in various campaigns for different patrons in central Italy.

In 1354, after Urslingen had died and Fra' Moriale had taken over the leadership of the Great Company, Landau rejoined its ranks and fought in various conflicts with Pisa, Siena, Florence and Milan. When Fra' Moriale was captured and executed in Rome later that year Landau himself took command.

After further years of fighting for various sponsors, his company came up in 1363 against the White Company led by Albert Sterz and John Hawkwood at the Battle of Canturino. During the battle, the wounded Landau was captured and died of his injuries later in the day.

== Historical context ==
Konrad existed during a time of conflict between cities and a larger Guelph and Ghibelline war. Konrad von Landau serves as a case study to better understand how people profited from chaotic wars, famine, and the plague.

The numerous wars and conflicts created a demand for the development of free companies. Disputes over land caused cities to go to war with one another. Some of these conflicts involving Konrad von Landau include disputes over the land between many of these northern Italian cities. Many of these disputes were funded not only between the towns but by either the papacy or the Holy Roman Empire. This conflict is known as the Guelph and Ghibelline Wars. The Ghibellines describe the cities allied with the empire and the Guilphs with the papacy. The election of bishops was another driving disputed in this conflict. The importance of bishops in the 14th century boils down to the notion that they developed the laws and collected resources and taxes from the lands in their county.

In this period, there was a continuous cycle of hiring mercenary armies. to fight off one another. Those that were disbanded often took on new alliances in a new or adjacent conflict. One example of this is the display of mercenaries such as Albert Sterz or John Hawkwood. The practice of these condottieri and the Routers was to pillage, raid, and ransom money and supplies from cities. This was common among all free companies in Northern Italy. Their effectiveness at draining resources enabled these cities to develop standing armies to combat their leverage to ransom. These cities would develop forts in their countryside and join city leagues to combat the roaming companies. This continual recruitment of militant groups indirectly contributed to the persistent emergence of other free companies.

Aside from inner city conflicts, the massive famine and the plague are other major contextual events relating to Konrad von Landau. The famine in the early 14th century caused an increase in urbanization. This is partly due to failing farms as individuals looked to the city to find security amidst the countryside. It is probable that the raiding nature of routers derived from a period of forced labor changes. Additional context on Conrad includes the black death, which came to Italy in 1347. This is when Conrad roomed in Northern Italy with the Great Company. Because of the increased urbanization, the plague took an expensive toll on the cities these companies raided.

== Historiography ==
Most of the research on Landau has been done in Italian. However, historians like Norman Housley, Mallet, and Caferro provide some description of his endeavors in English, specifically while he was in charge of the Great Company. William Caffero particularly mentioned Konrad in references to the economic impact they had on cities and their surrounding region.

Landau’s life, as well as many other condottieri at the time, are mentioned almost exclusively alongside their companies in secondary sources. Often, Konrad’s mentioned with the purpose of describing his title and occupation. The roster of historians referencing Landau significantly expands when analyzing the conflicts and free companies in which he participated. This includes the wars of the Italian city-states, the Papel conflicts, and the Guelph and Gibboline Wars throughout the regions of Tuscany, Lombardy, and Umbria.

Many historians have looked to primary and contemporary sources such as Matteo Villani, Dante, Bruni, and Machiavelli, of whom the latter three held distasteful opinions on the mercenary companies and the routers. Secondary sources take note of the positionality of these sources and how majority of them have biases siding with the papacy in Italy.

=== Primary sources ===
Matteo Villani’s The Cronica offers accounts for Conrad's alliances, battles, and general life as a condottiere. He is mentioned far more in the second, third, fourth, and fifth volumes than in the first, signifying his rise to become an essential figure in the Great Company. Notably, this source references him under the name Count of Lando. The Cronica is the most comprehensive of the accessible and translated primary sources.

Another important primary source of Conrad specifically is a documented letter between Cardinal Albornoz and Conrad himself. Translated by William Caffero, it states the nature of Conrad's operation in Italy. Conrad summarizes that, for the Great Company, it was custom to steal and kill those in both cities and the local countryside who resisted funding them. The letter's language serves as a warning to the Cardinal, and the lack of diplomacy indicates a forceful invasion wherever the company resided. Matteo Villani confirms this brutality in his earliest mention of Conrad in his Trends of the Great Company.

Other translated and accessible primary sources that discuss the Great Company in greater length include the Biccherna budget in Siena and the Cronica Senesi. The former discusses some of the tactics on raids and how the Great Company operated through smaller bands or groups of routers. The latter consists of data and statistics that provide insight to the expansive toll the Great Company took on a cities resources and finances.

== Bibliography ==
- Jacques Le Goff, L'uomo medievale, Bari, Laterza, 1999. ISBN 88-420-4197-1.
- Michael Mallet, Signori e mercenari. La guerra nell'Italia del Rinascimento, Bologna, Il Mulino, 1983. ISBN 88-15-00294-4.
- Claudio Rendina, I capitani di ventura, Roma, Newton, 1999. ISBN 88-8289-056-2.
- Ercole Ricotti, Storia delle compagnie di ventura in Italia, Athena, 1929.
