= Parabiago =

Parabiago Parabiagh (Lombard)
- Comune
- Città di Parabiago
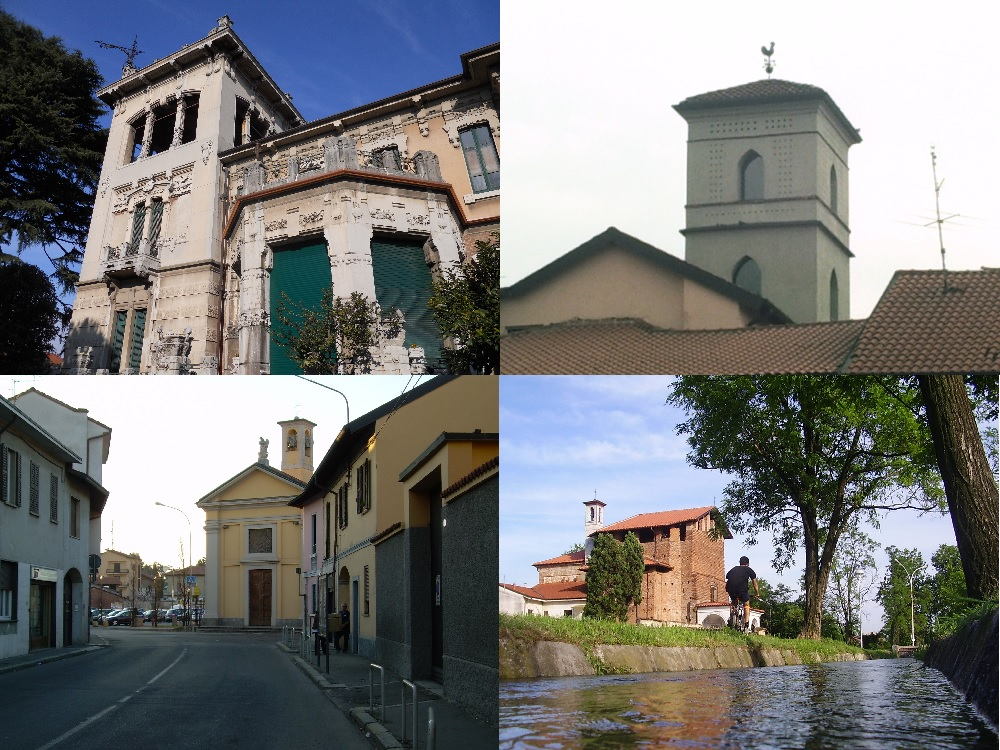
- Clockwise from top: Villa Ida Lampugnani-Gajo; ornamental tower in a lombard court; a roggia with the "Madonna di Dio il Sà" church in the background; and via San Michele with the church of San Michele in the background

- Coat of arms
- Nickname: The City of Footwear
- Location within Italy Location within Lombardy
- Coordinates: 45°33′N 08°57′E
- Country: Italy
- Region: Lombardy
- Metropolitan city: Milan (MI)

Government
  - Mayor: Raffaele Cucchi

Area
  - Total: 14.16 km^{2} (5.47 sq mi)
- Elevation: 184 m (604 ft)

Population (28 February 2017)
  - Total: 27,723
  - Density: 1,958/km^{2} (5,071/sq mi)
- Demonym: Parabiaghesi
- Time zone: UTC+1 (CET)
  - Summer (DST): UTC+2 (CEST)
- Postal code: 20015
- Dialing code: 0331 (Busto Arsizio Code)
- Patron saint: St. Gervasius and Protasius
- Saint day: 19 June
- Website: Official website

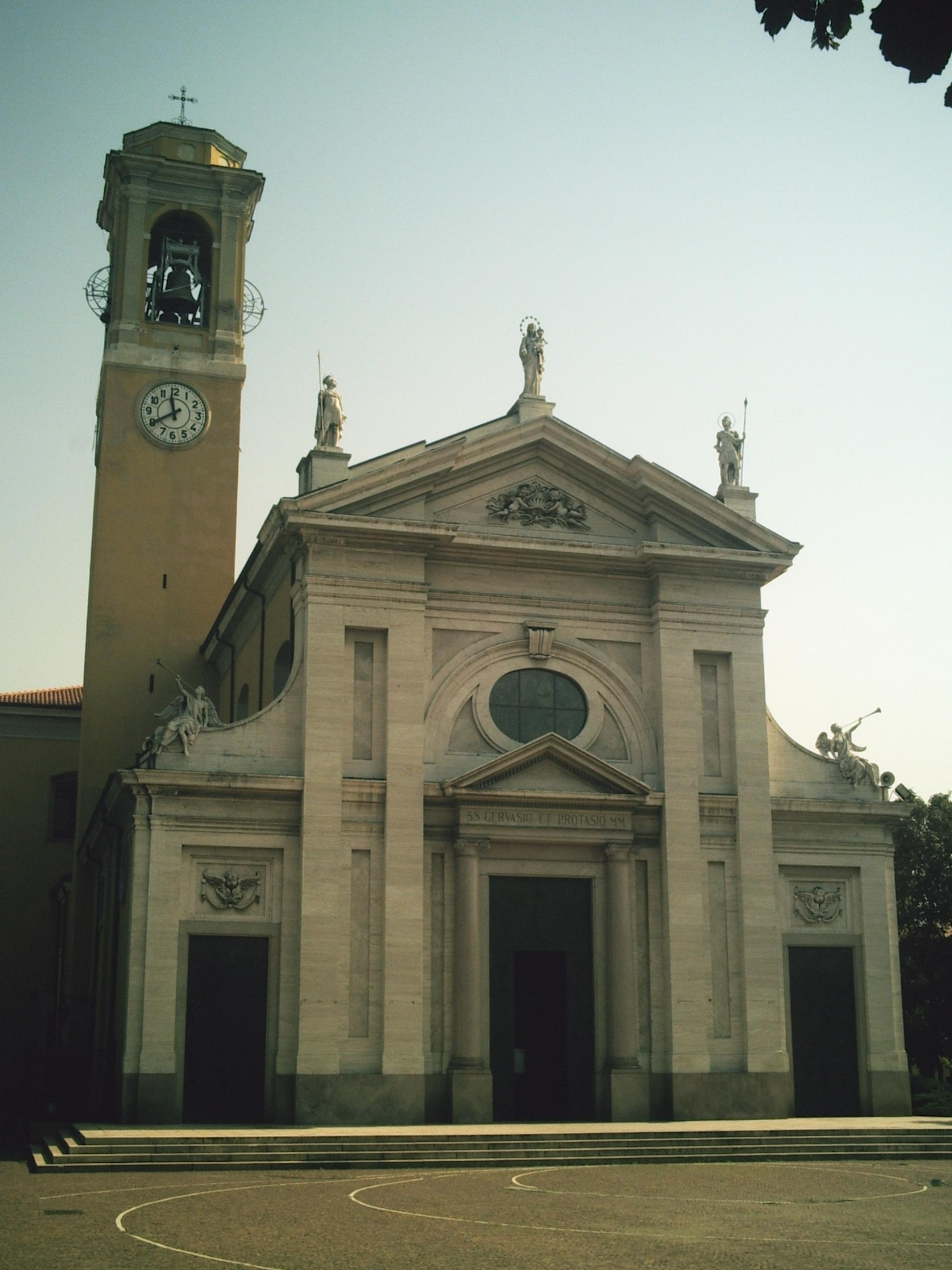
St. Gervasius and Protasius Church

Parabiago (Milanese: Parabiagh; Latin: Parabiacum) is a town located in the north-western part of the Metropolitan City of Milan, Lombardy, northern Italy.

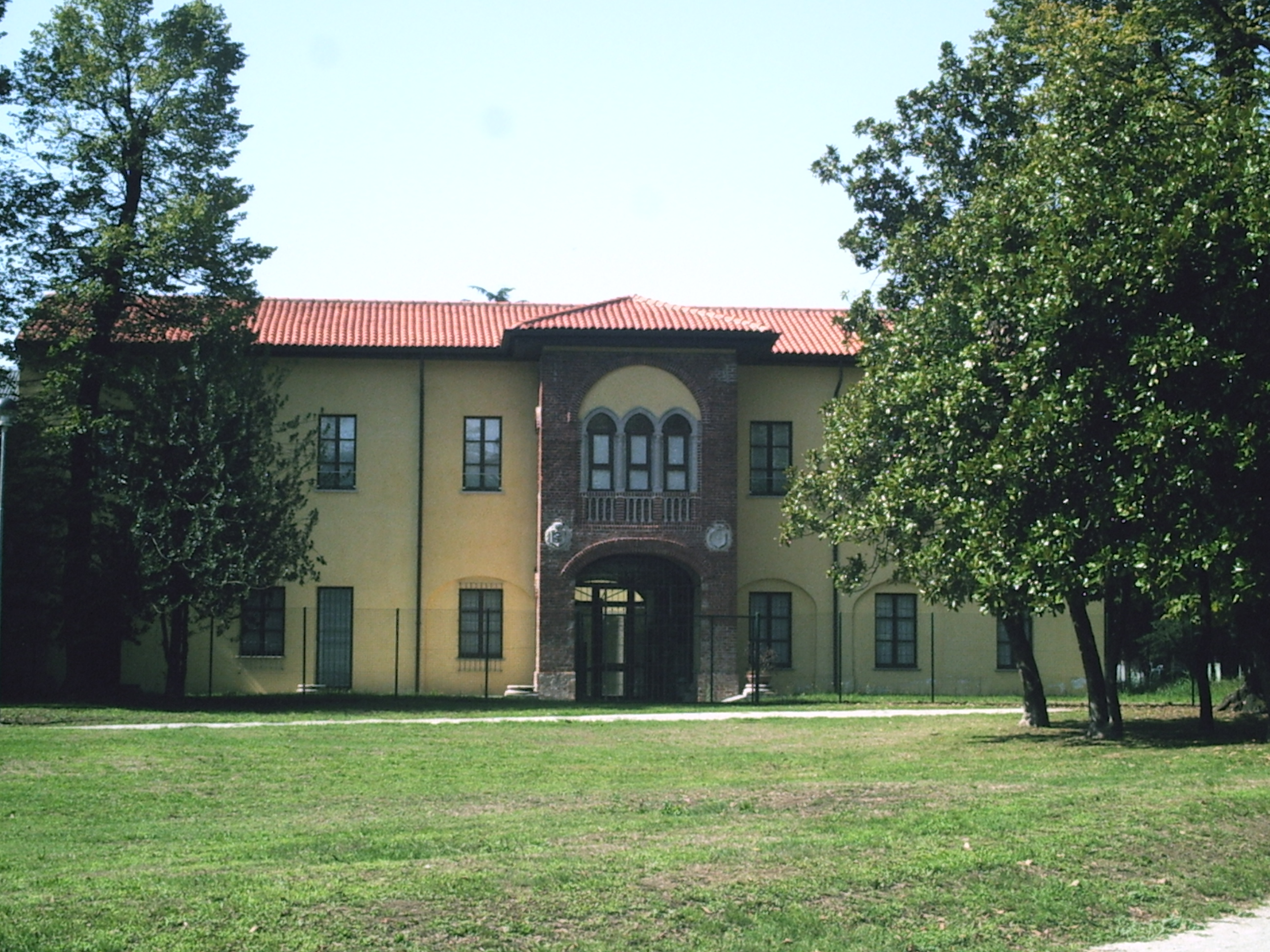
The Maggi-Corvini Villa

The town is crossed by the road to Sempione (S.S.33) and Milan – Gallarate Railway; nearby flow the Olona river and the Canale Villoresi.

== History ==
=== Ancient history and Middle Ages ===
Starting from the first Celtic-insubrian settlement (4th century BC), it developed during the Roman Empire rule, as documented by various archaeological discoveries of little objects, including the Parabiago Plate, a silver plate probably used to cover an ashes urn.

In the Early Middle Ages, Parabiago was the centre of a parish (pieve) and of an autonomous county, named Comitatus Parabiagi and sometimes Burgaria, governed by the Sanbonifacio family, of Frankish descent, coming from Verona; in the 7th century, it received by the Lombard queen Theodelinda the permission for a little artificial stream, named Riale or Röngia, which took water from the Olona river and travelled through the village: that stream lasted until the 1928, when it was definitively stilted up.

The Truce of Parabiago (28 – 29 August 1257) led to the Pace di Sant'Ambrogio (Saint Ambrose's Peace), so called because it was signed in the homonymous Basilica in Milan). It put an end to the risk of a civil war between nobles and people in the free commune of Milan. On 21 February 1339, it was the location of the Battle of Parabiago between Lodrisio Visconti and Luchino Visconti with his nephew Azzone, for the dominion over the Duchy of Milan; the battle was won by the Milanese regular army; according to tradition, this happened thanks to the miraculous apparition of Saint Ambrose. During this time, the Crivelli family inherited from the Sanbonifacio family the County of Parabiago, perhaps still corresponding with the Burgaria County.

In the following centuries Parabiago had a slow decline; it suffered two pillages, in 1449 by Francesco Sforza and in 1527 by Bourbons of Spain, as well as two epidemics (1529 and 1540).

=== Modern Age ===
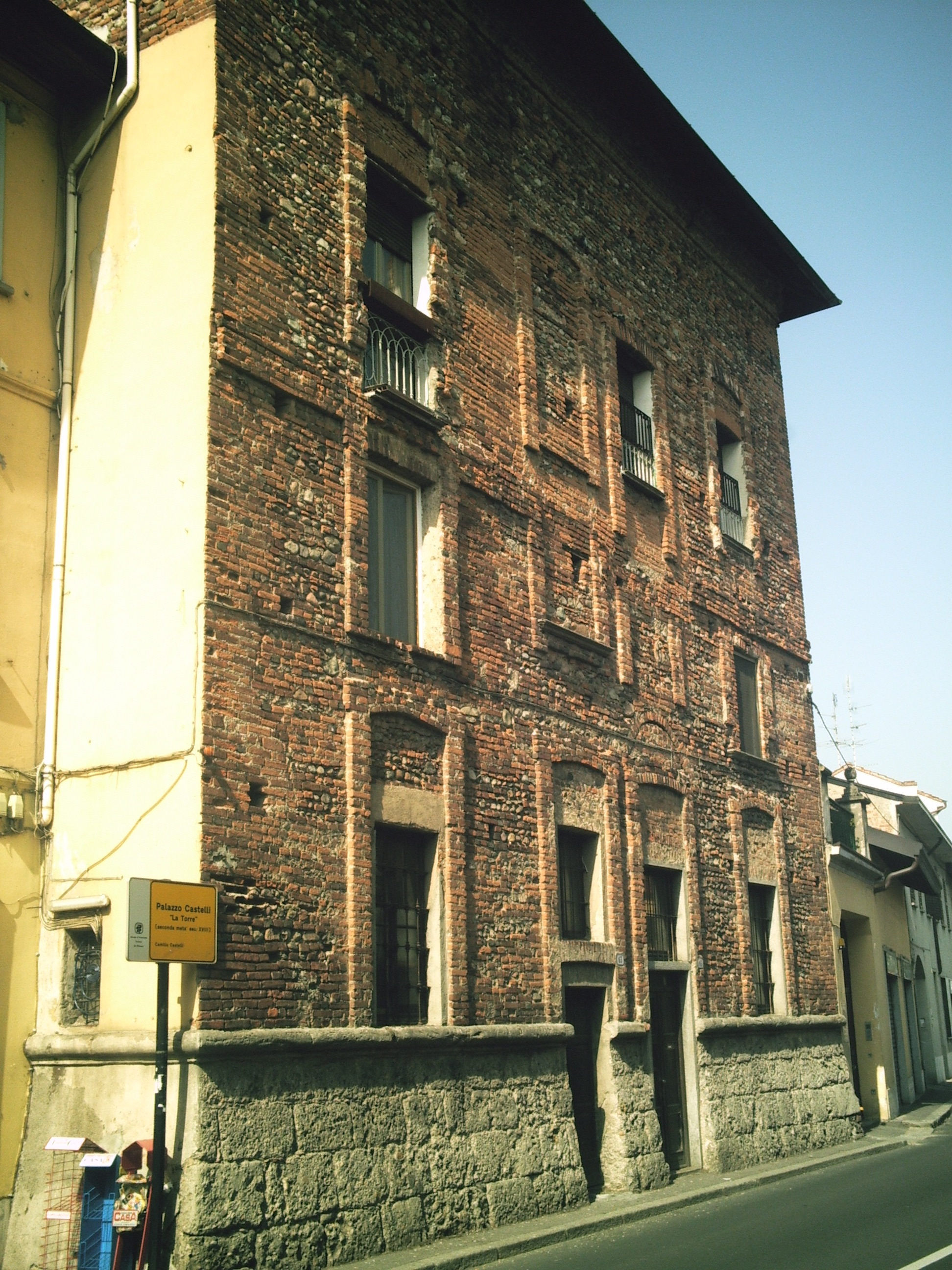
The Castelli Palace, called la Torre ("the Tower")

During Spanish rule in the Duchy of Milan, the Marquis Camillo Castelli bought the Fief of Parabiago for 8800 lire (26 September 1658); the family extinguished in 1783, with the death of Cardinal Giuseppe Castelli.

Parabiago developed in the 18th century, during the Austrian rule. Between the 19th and 20th centuries the Industrial Revolution reached Parabiago. The most active industrialists were Felice Gajo, who established the Unione Manifatture di Parabiago (United Manufacturing of Parabiago) (textiles), and Paolo Castelnuovo, who founded in 1899 the first shoe factory in the town. Since then, Parabiago is known as the Città della Calzatura (Shoes City).

=== 20th century ===
In the 1960s Parabiago like other cities and towns in Northern Italy experienced an economic boom followed by a demographic one. Industrialization caught on, the little traditional shoemakers established middle and big shoe factories; chemical and mechanical industries were born, and attracted immigration from Southern Italy. On 27 November 27, 1985 the town took the title of City.

In the early 1990s the majority of the Town Council, formed by D.C. (Christian Democracy), P.S.I. (Italian Socialist Party) and P.R.I. (Italian Republican Party), was forced to resign by the Tangentopoli scandal about the new urbanistic plan, and some important local politicians were arrested.

== Transport ==
In the district there is one stop of Metro Line S5, even if there is a project of the construction of another stop near the border with Nerviano Bourough. One Regional Railway station operated by Trenord is present in the city. Some Movibus (local bus lines) link the town with other boroughs.

== International relations ==
Parabiago is twinned with:

- Samobor, Croatia

== Sources ==
- Marco Ceriani, Storia di Parabiago, vicende e sviluppi dalle origini ad oggi, (History of Parabiago), Unione Tipografica di Milano, 1948
- Egidio Gianazza, Uomini e cose di Parabiago (Men and things from Parabiago), Comune di Parabiago, 1990
- Raul Dal Santo, Matteo Dolci, Ipotesi di definizione del paesaggio dell’altomilanese in epoca imperiale romana (Hypothesis about the Alto Milanese country during Roman Empire), Comune di Parabiago, 2006
