= Battle of Campo delle Mosche =

1359 battle in Italy

Coordinates: 43.66°N 10.63°E

Date	23 July 1359
Location	Campo delle Mosche, Pontedera, Pisa
Result	Florentine victory

Belligerents
Florence	Great Company

Commanders and leaders
Pandolfo Malatesta	Konrad von Landau

Strength
3,000 cavalry, 500 foot, 2,500 archers	500 cavalry, 1,000 foot

The Battle of Campo delle Mosche (Battle of the Field of the Flies) took place on 23 July 1359 in the district of Pontedera in the state of Pisa, Italy between the forces of Florence and those of the mercenary Great Company. It resulted in a victory for the Florentine forces.

== Starting operations ==
In 1359 Florence reacted to extortion threats by the Great Company under Konrad von Landau by assembling an army, with the help of Padua, Milan, Ferrara, and Naples, to oppose them. The Great Company had 500 cavalry and 1,000 Hungarian foot soldiers whilst the Florentine forces under the command of Pandolfo Malatesta numbered 3,000 cavalry, 500 Hungarians, and 2,500 archers.

== Battle ==
The Company troops established themselves in a defended position at Campo delle Mosche. But after being besieged by Malatesta for several days with no food or water they broke up and fled.

== Bibliography ==
- Stato Maggiore Esercito - Ufficio Storico. Niccolò Giorgetti. Le Armi Toscane e le occupazioni straniere in Toscana., 1916, Unione Arti Grafiche, Roma;
- Stato Maggiore Esercito - Ufficio Storico. Flavio Russo. La difesa costiera dello Stato dei Reali presidi di Toscana dal XIV al XIX secolo, 2002, Roma;
- Franco Cardini - Marco Tangheroni. Guerra e guerrieri nella Toscana del Rinascimento, 1990, Edifir, Firenze;
- Archivio di Stato di Firenze. La Toscana dei Lorena nelle mappe dell'Archivio di Stato di Praga. Memorie ed immagini di un Granducato. 1991, Firenze.
- Michael Mallett. Mercenaries and their Masters: Warfare in Renaissance Italy, 1974
