= Baglioni =

Baglioni is an Italian surname. Notable people with the surname include:

- Claudio Baglioni (b. 1951), Italian musician
- Piero Baglioni (b. 1952), Italian chemist and university professor at the University of Florence
- Giovanni Baglione (1566–1643), Italian early Baroque painter and historian of art
- Cesare Baglioni (c. 1525–1590), Italian painter of the Renaissance period
- Baglioni (family) or one of its members:
  - Rodolfo Baglioni (1512–1554), Italian condottiero serving in the Imperial army
  - Astorre Baglioni
  - Malatesta Baglioni the Elder (died 1437), ruler of Cannara, Spello and Bastia Umbra
  - Malatesta Baglioni the Younger (1491–1531), ruler of Perugia
  - Grifonetto Baglioni
  - Gian Paolo Baglioni (c.1470–1520), condottiero and nemesis of Cesare Borgia

== See also ==
- Baglioni Hotels, an Italian hotel firm with branches in London, Milan and other locations
- Pala Baglioni, an oil painting by Raphael
- Rappaccini's Daughter, a short story by Nathaniel Hawthorne featuring a central character named Baglioni
