= Baglioni Hotel =

Luxury hotel in London

Baglioni Hotel London

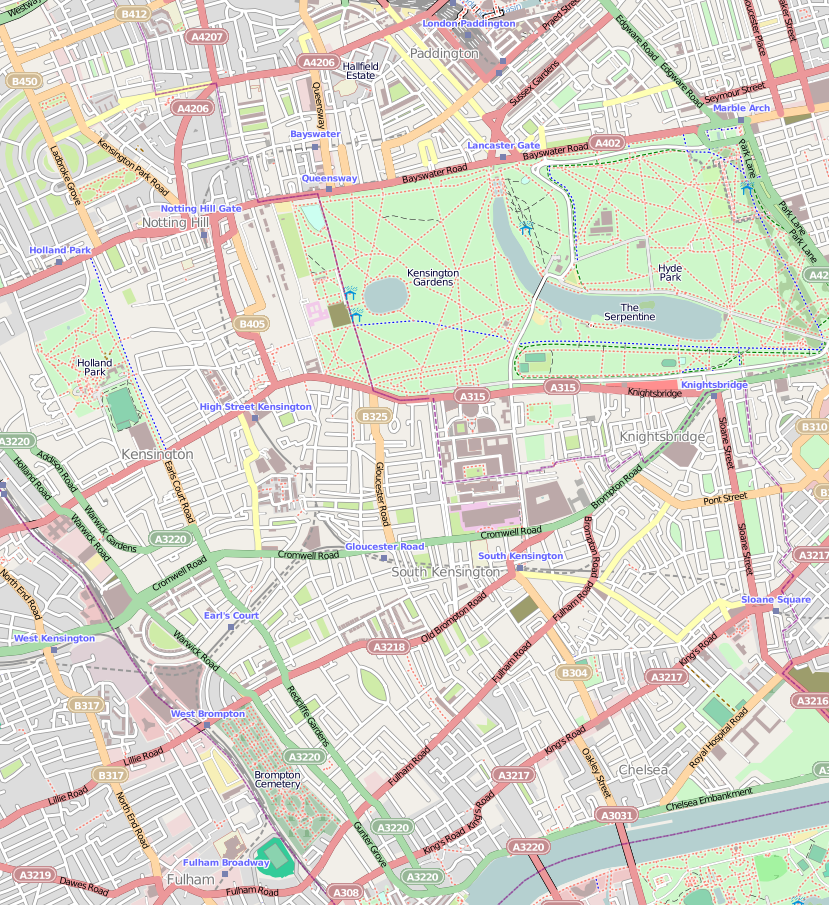
- Location in Kensington

General information
- Location: Kensington, London, England
- Coordinates: 51°30′5.4″N 0°11′4.92″W
- Owner: Baglioni Hotels

Other information
- Number of rooms: 67

Baglioni Hotel London was a 5-star luxury hotel in London, England. It was located at Hyde Park Gate in the Kensington area of London in a Georgian-era building overlooking Hyde Park. It was owned by Baglioni Hotels, an Italian firm that also has hotels in Venice, Milan The Maldives and several other places.

== Interior ==
The hotel contained Italian furnishings and had a fountain, stone floors and large gold vases. The hotel had 67 rooms, with 53 suites, including three executive suites and two presidential suites.

The hotel was served by the Ristorante Brunello which specializes in Mediterranean food, particularly Italian cuisine, and uses fresh ingredients imported from Italy for authenticity. It had over 500 wines on offer, including a collection of Sassicaia wines. The restaurant was located on the ground floor, facing Kensington Gardens. Furnishings included comfortable grey and gold velvet armchairs, Murano glass candelabras and a large fireplace.

The hotel also offered a VIP Maserati courtesy car service.

== Reception ==
Baglioni Hotel London was recognized as one of The Leading Small Hotels of the World. In 2007, it was voted by the Conde Nast Traveller, Reader's Travel Awards as the "15th Best UK Business Hotel". The Ristorante Brunello had been awarded with a Michelin star.
