= Visconti Castle (Jerago) =

- Castello Visconteo di Jerago
- Jerago (Jerago con Orago), Lombardy, Northern Italy
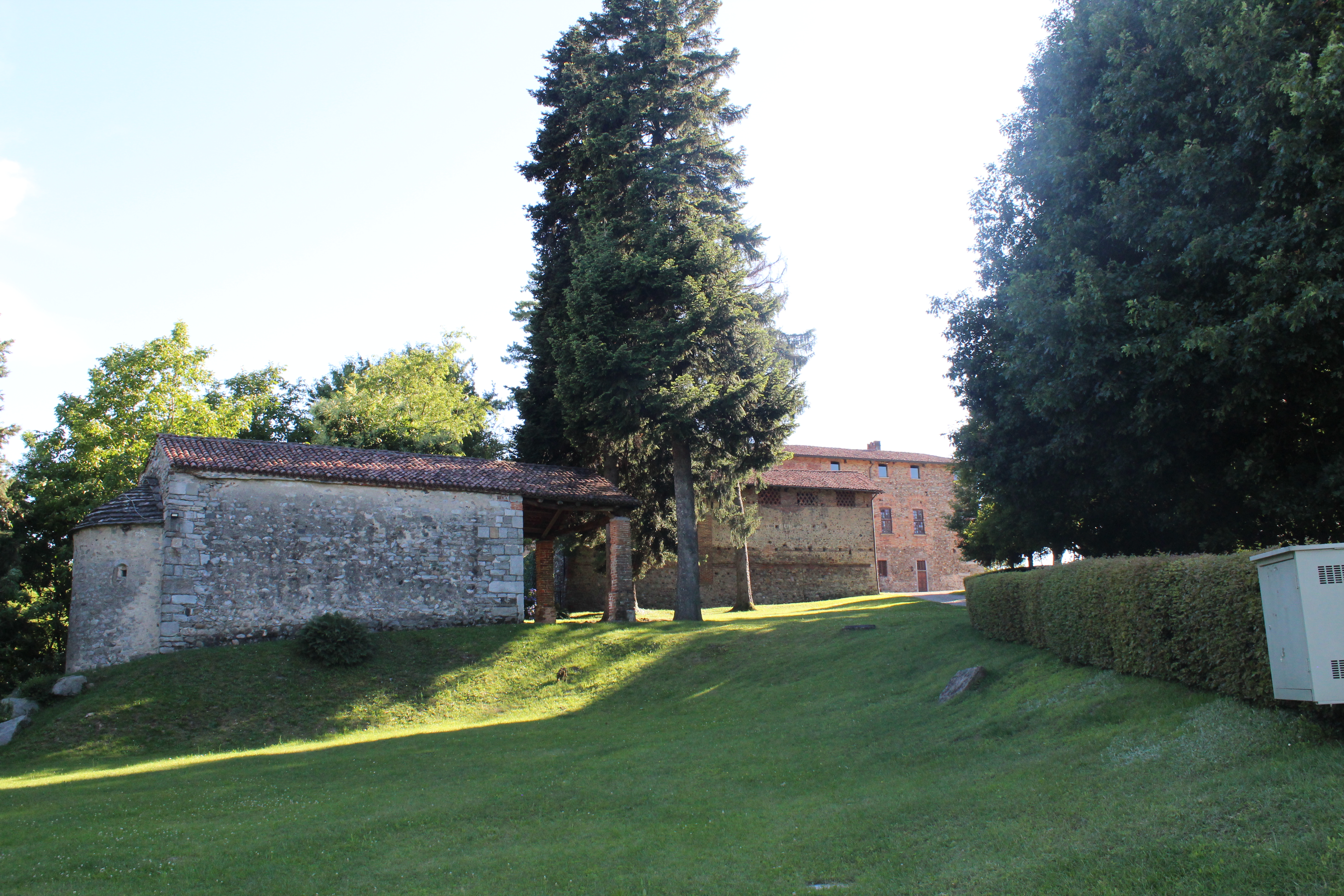
- The castle seen in the distance with the San James church on the left

Site information
- Type: Medieval castle, noble residence
- Owner: Private
- Open to the public: No, only for private events
- Condition: Good

Location
- Coordinates: 45°42′21″N 8°47′02″E

Site history
- Built: 12th century or before
- Built by: Visconti, Visconti di Jerago, Bossi families

The Visconti Castle (Castello Visconteo in Italian) of Jerago is a castle of Middle Age origin located in Jerago, Lombardy, Northern Italy. Having been a property of members of the Visconti house between the 13th and 18th centuries, it retains still today their memory in its name.

== Location ==
The castle lies a few hundred meters from the town of Jerago in the direction of the nearby Besnate on a hill known since the Middle Age under the name of mons Sancti Jacobi (Latin for “hill of Saint James”). The name derives from the small Romanesque church located near the castle and dedicated to Saint James.

== History ==
Probably the site was fortified since the Early Middle Ages. The current castle dates back at least to the 12th century, as suggested by the nearby church of San James with its 10th-century frescos.

Since the 13th century, the castle and the lands subject to it are attested as a Visconti property. In the 14th century, after divisions among heirs, the estate passed to the Visconti di Jerago, a collateral branch of the Visconti that resided permanently in the castle.

Albeit a minor branch of the Visconti house, the Visconti di Jerago gained some prominence from marriage to personalities of the 15th century. Antonia Visconti di Jerago married the condottiero Francesco Bussone da Carmagnola. One generation later, Elisabetta married Cicco Simonetta, a statesman of the Duchy of Milan and first secretary of Francesco Sforza. Bernabò and Gaspare, son of Azzone, brothers of Elisabetta, divided their inheritance in 1493. The deed of their property division contains the first detailed description of the castle: U-shaped and closed on one side by a simple wall. The castle was later enlarged and closed to the north with a new wing, receiving the current quadrilateral shape.

With the extinction of the Visconti di Jerago, in the 18th century, the castle passed to members of the Bossi family, who accentuated its characteristic as an elegant residence. They opened doors and windows and arranged a terraced garden downhill to the south.

== Today ==
The castle is today a private estate. In good conditions, it is available for corporate, cultural, or private events.

Above the entrance, an 18th-century coat of arms of the Bossi family is still visible.

== Sources ==
- Conti, Flavio; Hybsch, Vincenzo; Vincenti, Antonello (1990). I castelli della Lombardia. Provincie di Milano e Pavia (in Italian). Novara: Istituto Geografico de Agostini. ISBN 88-402-9108-3.
- Del Tredici, Federico; Rossetti, Edoardo (2012). Percorsi castellani: da Milano a Bellinzona: guida ai castelli del ducato (in Italian). Castelli del ducato. ISBN 9788896451021.
- Litta Biumi, Pompeo (1819–1884). Visconti di Milano. Famiglie celebri italiane (in Italian). Milano: Luciano Basadonna Editore. OCLC 777242652.
