= Werner von Urslingen =

German mercenary

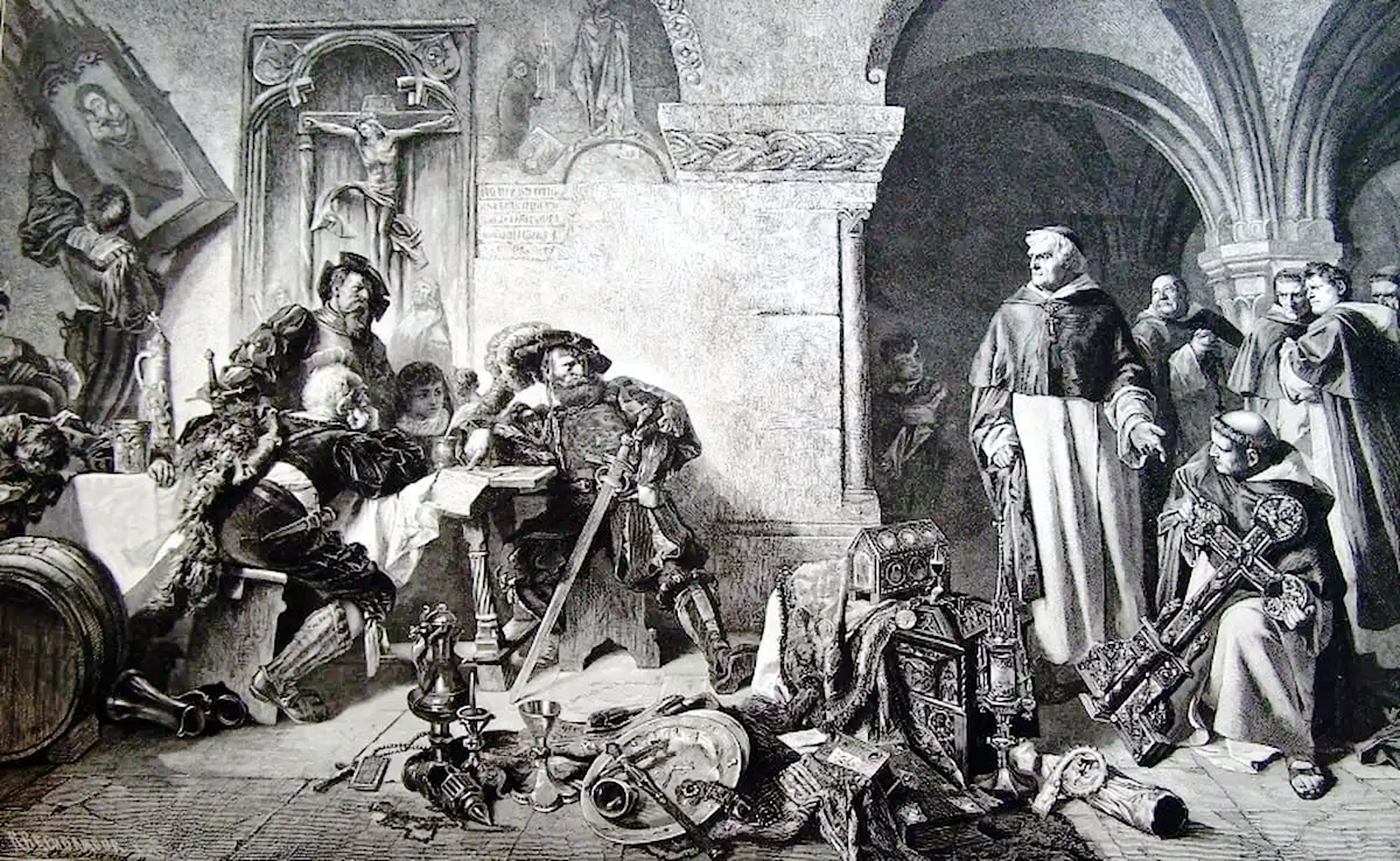
Wernher von Urslingen collecting tribute from a church

Werner von Urslingen (Werner of Urslingen in English, called in Italian: Guarnieri d'Urslingen or Duca Guarnieri; c. 1308 – 1354) from German-speaking origins in the Holy Roman Empire was a mercenary serving mostly in Italy, and also known as the founder of the Great Company.

== Biography ==
Werner was born at Irslingen, in Irslingen Swabia, a member of the family of the dukes of Urslingen, and probably a descendant of the dukes of Spoleto. In 1338 he fought in the Scaliger War for the Republic of Venice against Mastino II della Scala of Verona. After the end of that conflict, he entered the Compagnia di San Giorgio, financed by the Veronese and led by Lodrisio Visconti, and took part in the battle of Parabiago.

In 1342 Werner joined the service of the Republic of Pisa in its war against Florence, whose troops were led by Malatesta III Malatesta. After that war he collected a troop of adventurers under the name Great Company, with which he plundered rural Tuscany, Umbria, and the Romagna. He supported Francesco Ordelaffi against the Papal States, and was bribed by his enemy, Malatestino Malatesta of Rimini, to help him in his feud with Ferrantino Malatesta. In 1343 Werner was hired by Taddeo Pepoli of Bologna for a very large sum, to fight against Obizzo III d'Este of Modena; but he switched to the Este side and went on to ravage several cities, including Correggio. His company was subsequently expelled from the Ferrara area, and Werner of Urslingen returned to Germany with some of his men.

In 1347 he returned to the Italian peninsula and entered the service of Louis I the Great, king of Hungary and Poland, whom he assisted in obtaining possession of Naples. Werner of Urslingen's troops defeated Louis, Prince of Taranto (Joan's husband) near Naples, and King Louis was able to enter the city; the following year, however, Werner was accused of collaboration with Joan, and arrested. After having been freed, he entered the service of the Caetani of Fondi with 3,000 men, to attack the Orsini at Supino. In 1348 he sacked and destroyed Anagni: this spurred Perugia and other communes to muster an army against him, and Werner, whose troops had also been struck by the plague, was forced to retreat. He then joined the service of the Papal States, for which he conquered several territories, and then that of Joan of Naples, whom he helped to return to Naples. In 1349, after a period of fighting in Apulia (of which he was named viceroy), he was ambushed by the Hungarian Voivoda of Transylvania, Stephen Lackfi, and defeated. Werner then mustered an army of 3,000 Hungarian, German, and Neapolitan knights and 2,000 Lombard foot soldiers to counter-attack Stephen, defeating him before Naples.

In 1350 he allied with Giovanni di Vico to ravage the Papal fiefs in northern Latium. In the same period he signed an agreement with Louis of Taranto to cede him Capua, Aversa, and other strongholds in the Kingdom of Naples. Werner subsequently fought for the lords of Forlì and Faenza against the papal legate, and, hired by Giacomo Pepoli of Bologna, helped him to regain his city, but not before sacking it. After Bologna was sold back to the Visconti, Werner besieged it, but was defeated by Galeazzo II Visconti's army.

In 1351 his company was unable to find anyone to pay it, until he was hired by Mastino II della Scala and then by the Visconti. Later, he returned to Swabia, where he died in 1354. After his death, the leadership of the Grand Company went to Fra' Moriale.

He is said to have worn a breastplate with the inscription "The enemy of God, of pity and of mercy."

== Sources ==
- Rendina, Claudio (1999). I capitani di ventura. Rome: Newton & Compton. ISBN 88-8289-056-2.
