= Baglioni Hotels =

Baglioni Hotels S.p.A.
- Trade name: Baglioni Hotels & Resorts
- Type: Società per azioni
- Industry: Hospitality
- Founded: Punta Ala, Italy (March 1974)
- Number of locations: 8
- Website: baglionihotels.com

Founded in 1974, today Baglioni Hotels and Resorts includes a collection of eight (8) luxury properties in Italy, London, and the Maldives. Casa Baglioni Milan, which opened its doors in early 2023, adds to the company's collection of City Hotels, with other locations in Rome, Florence, Venice, and London.) The Baglioni Collection also includes luxury Resorts in Apulia in the Salento countryside; one in the marine protected area of Tavolara on Sardinia's northeast coast; and one in the Maldives, on the island of Maagau, in Dhaalu atoll.

== History ==
In the early 70s, Roberto Polito was sent to the Tuscan coast to develop a resort for a Swiss company. He fell in love with the Tuscan region at first sight. By the time the partnership ended, Roberto had determined his next venture, and in 1974, he opened Baglioni Resort Punta Ala.In 2011, Guido Polito was appointed as CEO by his father, Roberto. He subsequently went on to personally develop Hotel Baglioni London and the most recent Baglioni Resorts in the Maldives, Sardinia, and Apulia.

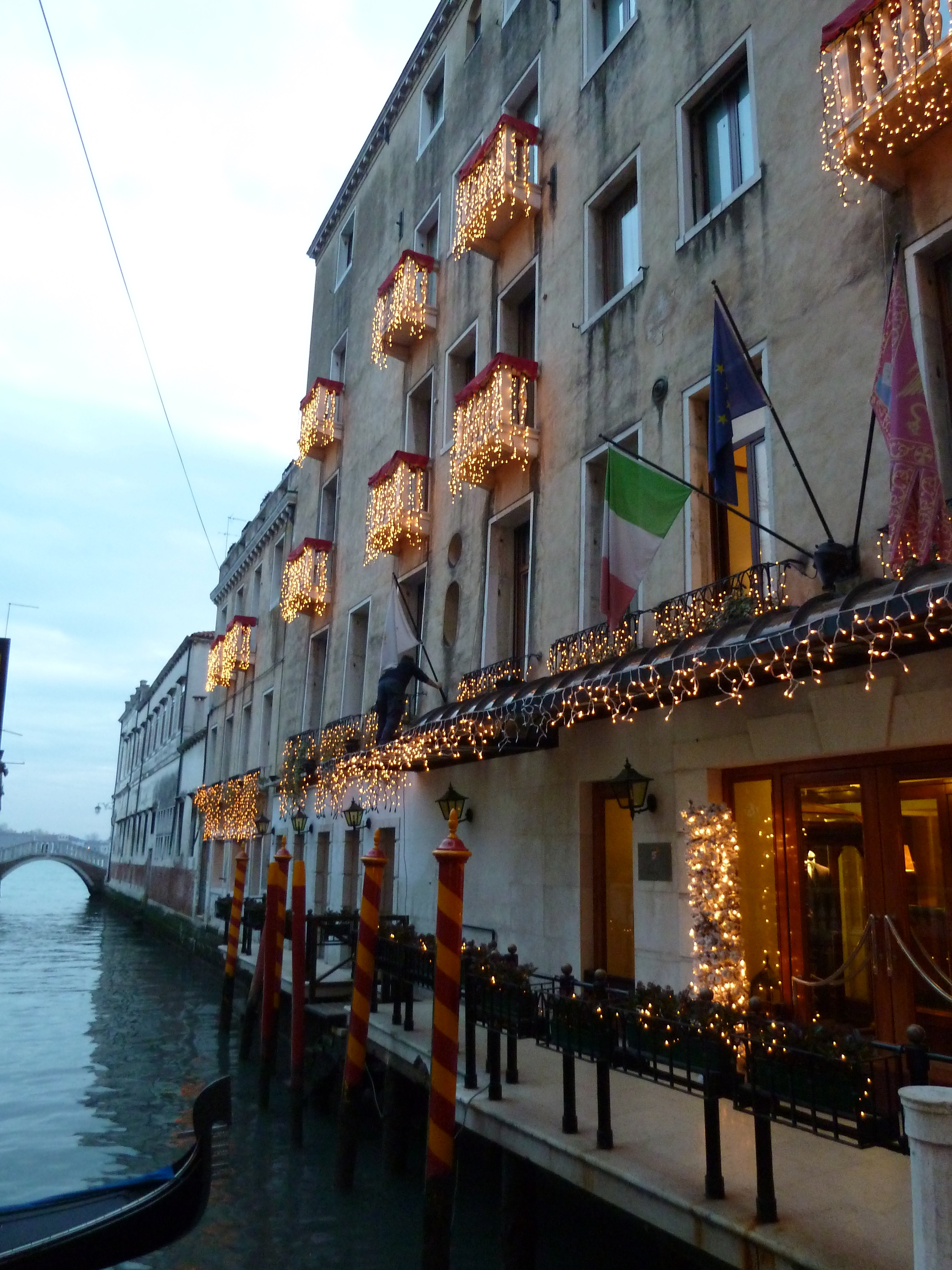
Baglioni Hotel Luna in Venice

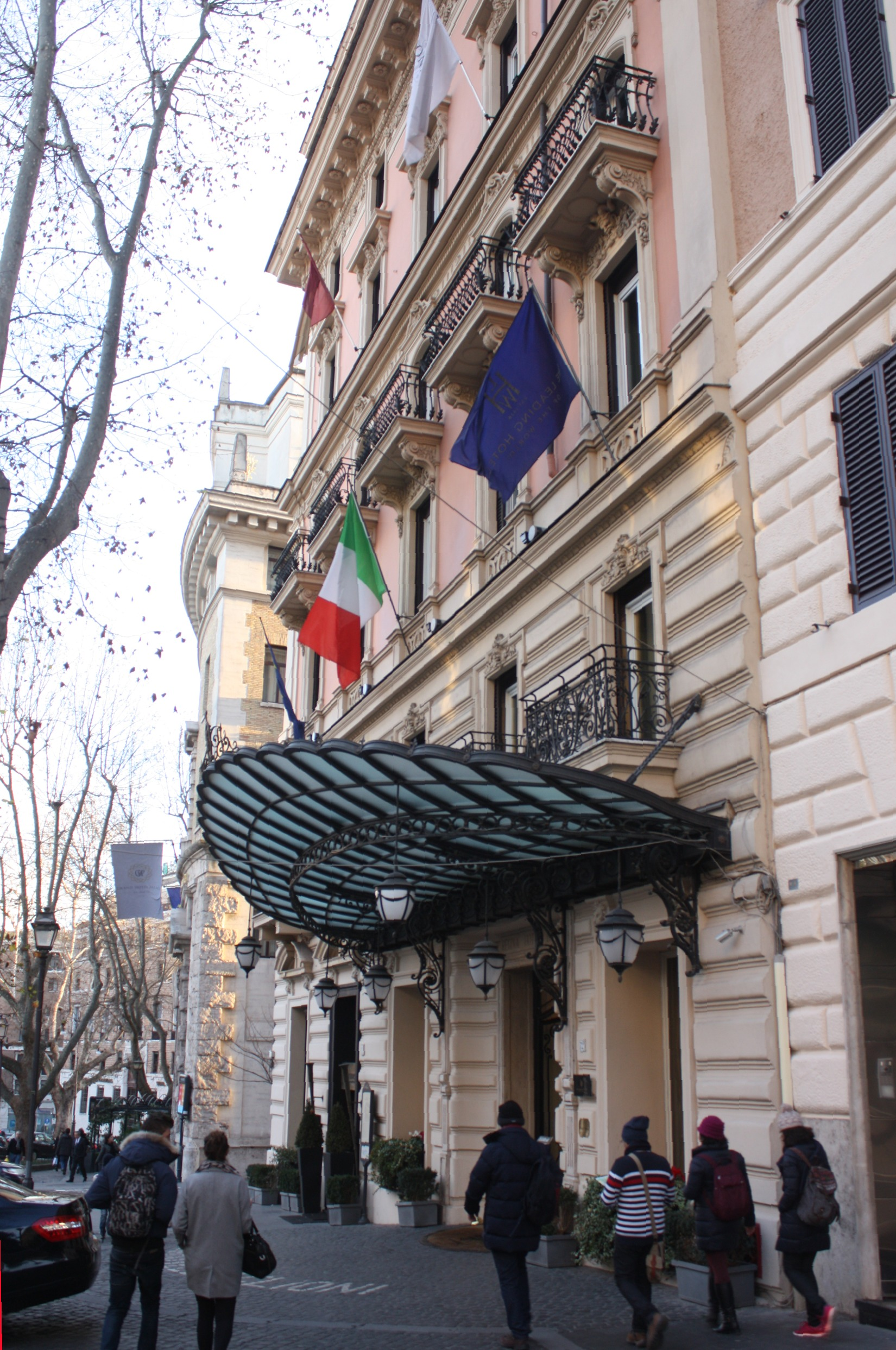
Baglioni Hotel Regina in Rome

- In 1974, Commendatore Roberto Polito bought his first property in Tuscany Baglioni Resort Cala del Porto in Punta Ala Tuscany and founded Baglioni Hotels Group.
- In 1988, the company bought the Baglioni Hotel Luna in Venice.
- In 1989, the company bought the Baglioni Hotel Regina in Rome.
- In 1992, the company bought the Baglioni Hotel Carlton in Milan.
- In 1998, the company bought three hotels in France.
- In 2004, Baglioni Hotels inaugurated the Baglioni Hotel London.
- In 2009, the Baglioni Relais Santa Croce in Florence was included in the Baglioni Collection.
- In 2011, Guido Polito, Roberto's son, was appointed CEO of the Group
- In 2014, Baglioni Hotels and Resorts celebrated its first 40 years of history.
- In 2019, the company inaugurated its first resort abroad, the Baglioni Resort Maldives, on the island of Maagau, in Dhaalu Atoll.
- In 2021, the company inaugurates the Baglioni Resort Sardinia on Sardinia's northeast coast, close to San Teodoro.
- In 2022, Baglioni Hotels formed a financial partnership with The Palace Company, formerly known as Palace Resorts.
- In February 2023, Casa Baglioni Milan opened its doors in the historic Brera district, home of the 1960s Art Deco movement.
- In September 2023, Baglioni Maldives became an all-inclusive resort, the brand's first property to adapt to this modality.
- In October 2023, Guido Polito left the role of CEO of Baglioni Hotels & Resorts, and Massimo Baldo became the brand's new VP for Europe.
- In 2023, The Palace Company became the sole shareholder of Baglioni Hotels & Resorts, consolidating the Mexican hotel group of all-inclusive resorts in Mexico, The Caribbean, Europe and The Maldives.
- In September 2024, Baglioni Relais Santa Croce became Palazzo Firenze by Baglioni Hotels and Resorts, a renaming to a new image of this luxury hotel in Florence
- In 2024, the Baglioni London property at 60 Hyde Park Gate underwent a change in management and was integrated into the portfolio of the French multinational hospitality company Accor.
