= Condottiere =

Mercenary soldier leader in medieval Italy

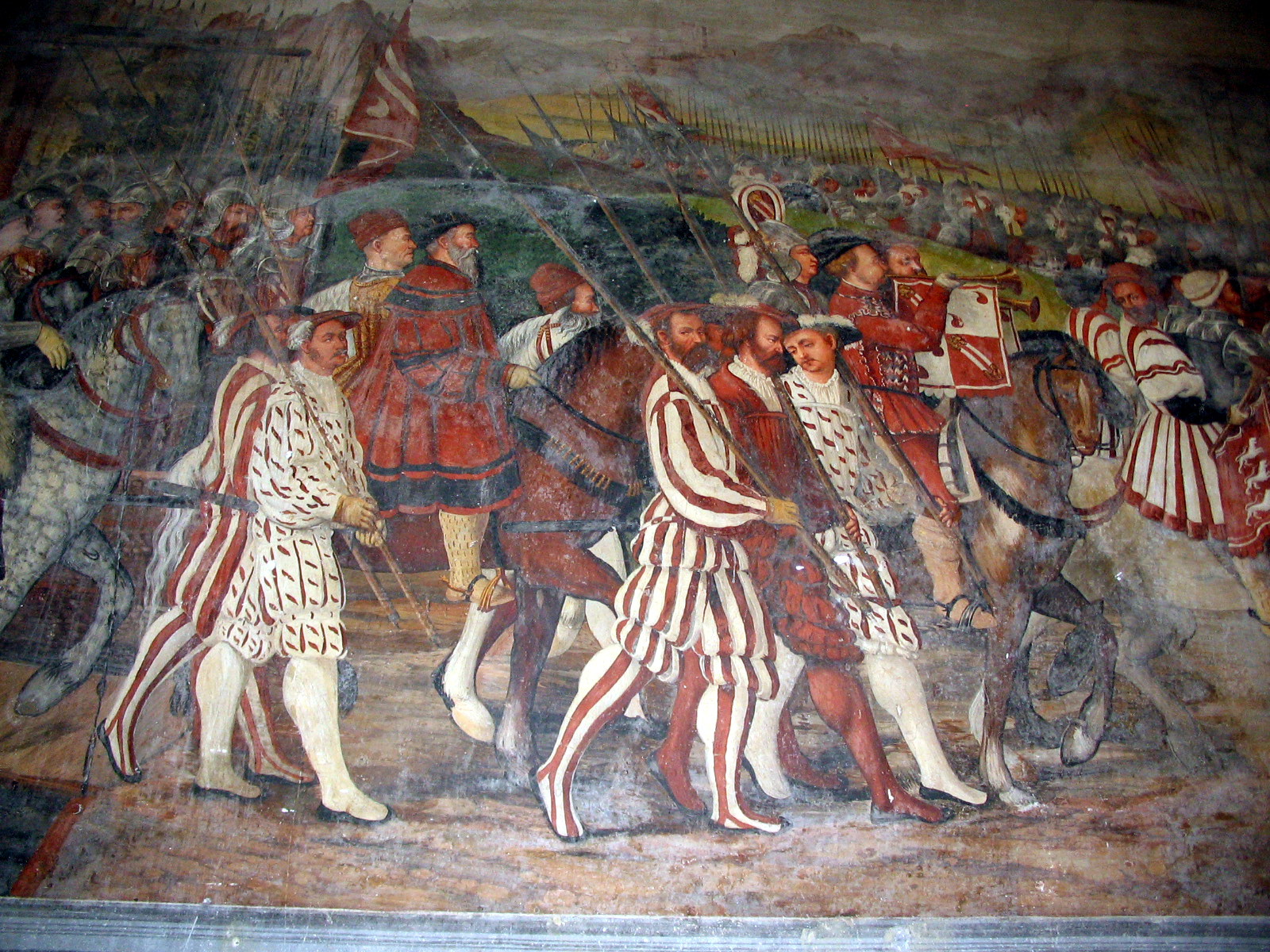
Condottiere and his troops in a Renaissance-era fresco, influenced by Landsknecht mercenary fashion

A condottiere or condottiero (plural: condottieri (Italian: [kondotˈtjɛːri])) was an Italian military leader active during the Middle Ages and the early modern period. The term originally referred specifically to commanders of mercenary companies, derived from the Italian word condotta—the contract under which they served their specific employers. The word condottiero thus meant 'contractor'. Over time, however, in Italian usage, condottiero came to mean any 'commander' or 'military leader'.

== Mercenary captains ==
=== History ===
Italy's earliest mercenary armies were initially foreign-led, beginning with Catalan troops in 1303 and later the Grand Company of Germans and Hungarians, which devastated Romagna, Umbria, and Tuscany under a code of discipline devised by the adventurer Montréal d'Albarno. The English captain John Hawkwood arrived during a lull in the Hundred Years' War in the 1360s and proceeded to lead the White Company for three decades through northern Italy's incessant warfare. By the end of the 14th century, Italians themselves had begun raising domestic mercenary forces, and politically ambitious condottieri started seizing their own princely states. The early 1400s saw Muzio Attendolo Sforza and Braccio da Montone refine company organization, while Muzio's son Francesco, who took control of Milan in 1450, emerged as the most celebrated of all the condottieri.

=== Rise ===
The first mercenary company with an Italian as its chief was the "Company of St. George" formed in 1339 and led by Lodrisio Visconti. This company was defeated and destroyed by Luchino Visconti of Milan (another condottiero and uncle of Lodrisio) in April 1339. Later, in 1377, a second "Company of St. George" was formed under the leadership of Alberico da Barbiano, also an Italian and the Count of Conio, who later taught military science to condottieri such as Braccio da Montone and Giacomuzzo Attendolo Sforza, who also served in the company.

The earlier, medieval condottieri developed the "art of war" (military strategy and tactics) into military science more than any of their historical military predecessors—fighting indirectly, not directly—thus, only reluctantly endangering themselves and their enlisted men, avoiding battle when possible, also avoiding hard work and winter campaigns, as these all reduced the total number of trained soldiers available, and were detrimental to their political and economic interest.

=== Politics ===
Condottieri gained a reputation in being quite untrustworthy when it came to protecting their allies. In many cases condottieri betrayed their employers for their own gain. Throughout the 14th century onwards, the condottiere would become an instrument of governance as well as a military expedient, with many political leaders taking control and establishing their own regimes through the aid of condottieri. The Italian city-states of Venice, Florence, and Genoa were very rich from trade yet possessed small armies, and had no desire to fight militarily. In the event that foreign powers and neighbors attacked, the ruling nobles hired foreign mercenaries to fight for them. Many mercenary leaders established states of their own. Francesco Sforza became Duke of Milan by marrying the daughter of Filippo Visconti. Federico da Montefeltro was the lord of the city of Urbino. Niccolo Machiavelli viewed that mercenary armies were generally inferior and instead preferred an army staffed with loyal, professional soldiers, a policy which he derived from observing antiquity.

=== Examples of condottieri ===
Various Italian noble families, such as the Sforza, Visconti, Gonzaga, Baglioni, Orsini, Borgia, and Colonna families have produced condottieri captains. John Hawkwood was an English soldier who became very esteemed in Italy as a military official.

== Evolution of the term ==
While the military service condotta gradually disappeared, the term condottiere remained in use, denominating the great Italian generals fighting for European states, monarchs and Popes during the Italian wars and the European wars of religion.

== Gallery ==
Condottieri

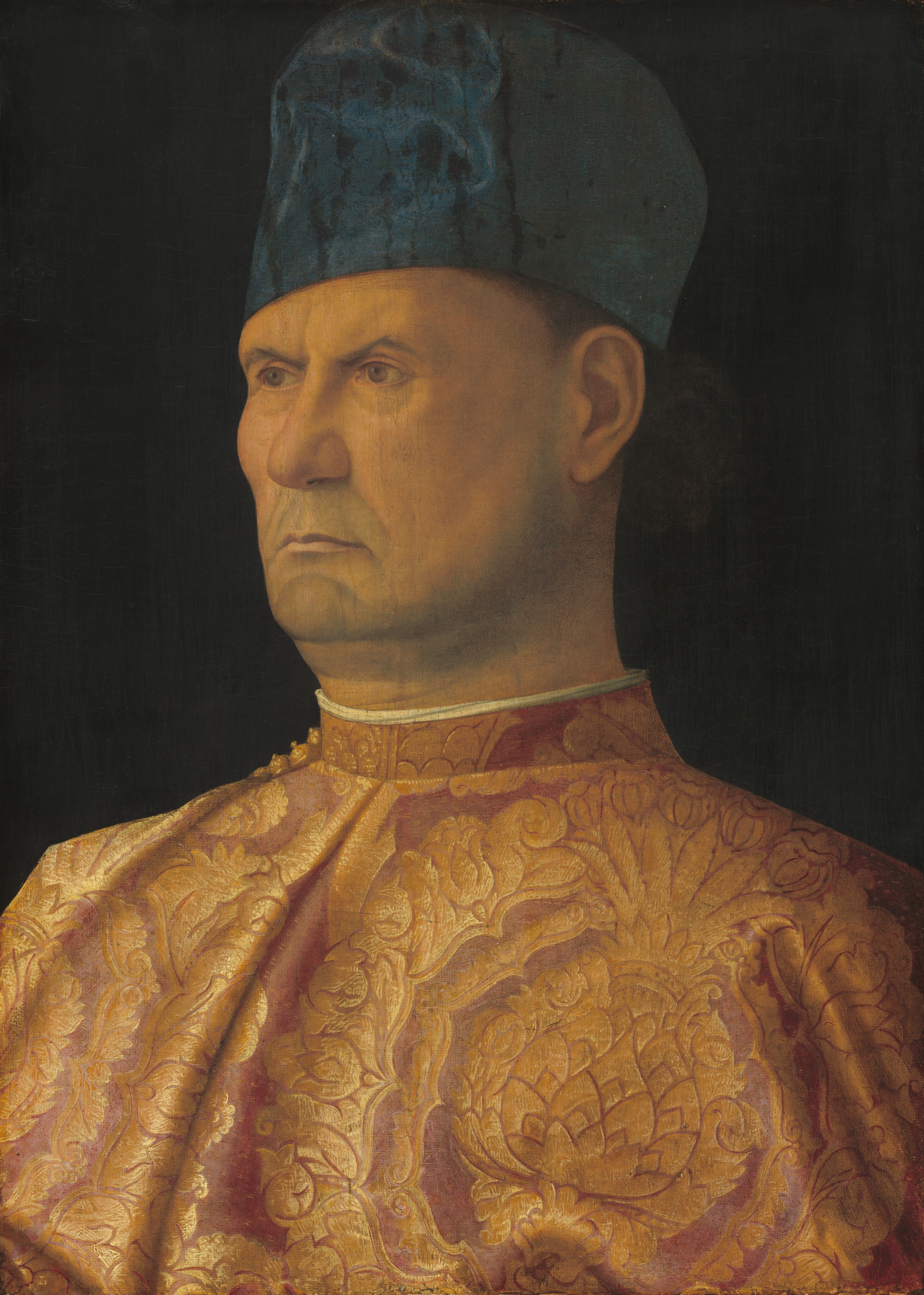
Bartolomeo d'Alviano, one of the condottieri who took part in the Battle of Garigliano

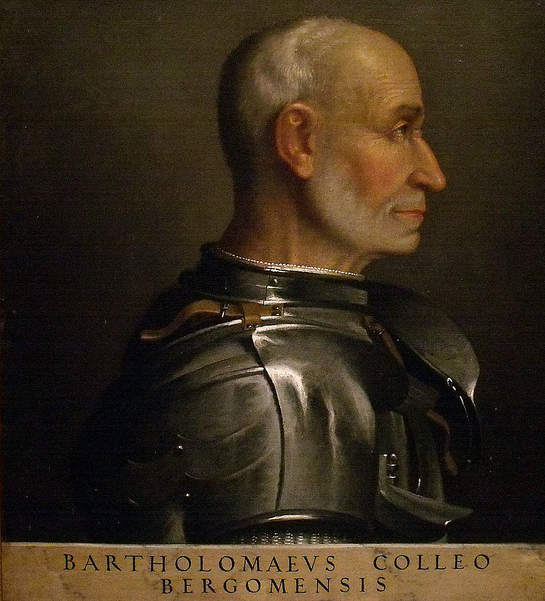
Bartolomeo Colleoni defeated the French at Bosco Marengo (1447).

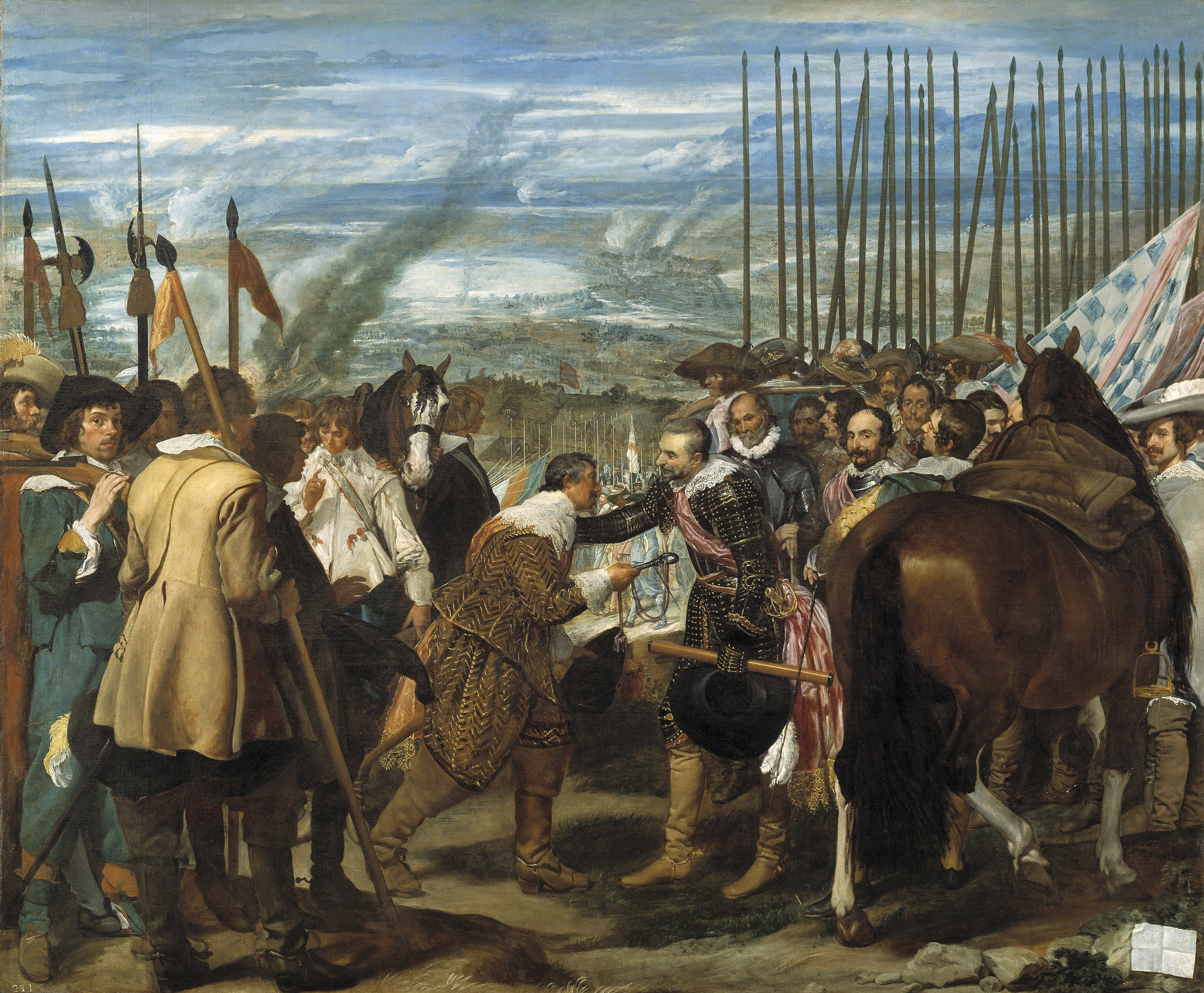
Ambrogio Spinola, one of the last examples of the condottieri tradition

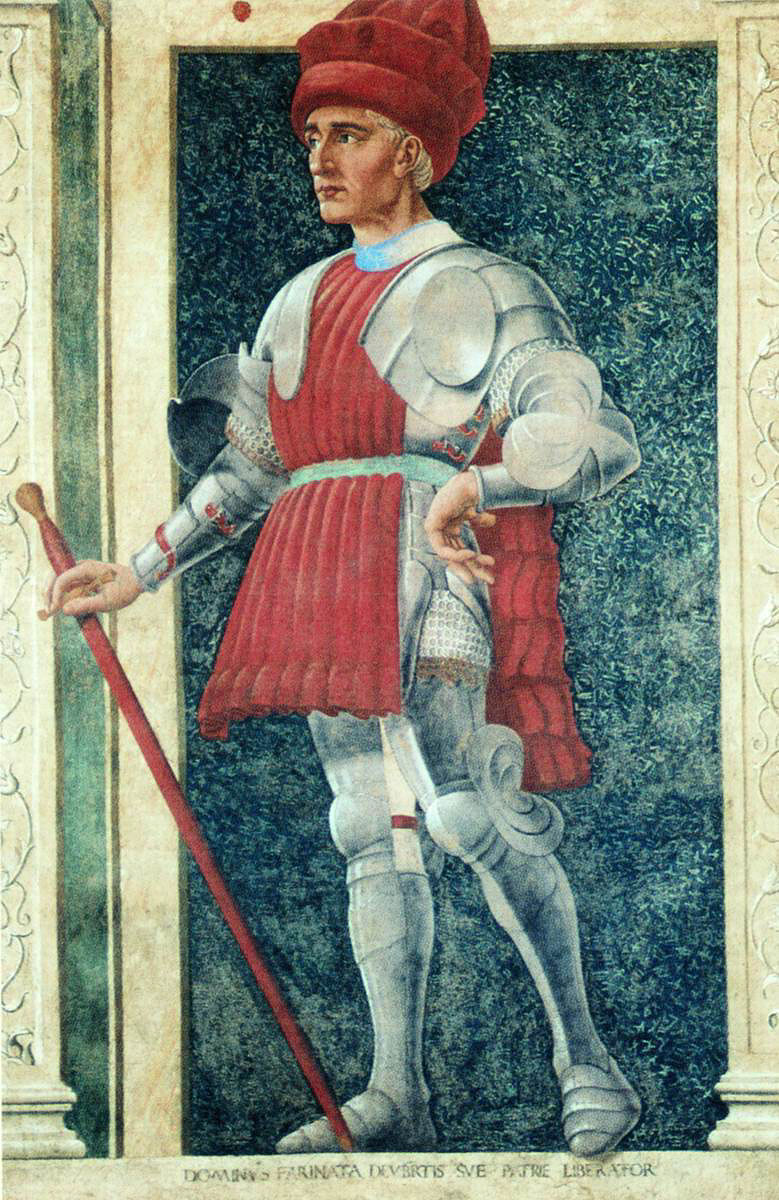
Farinata degli Uberti by Andrea del Castagno, showing a 15th-century condottiero's typical attire

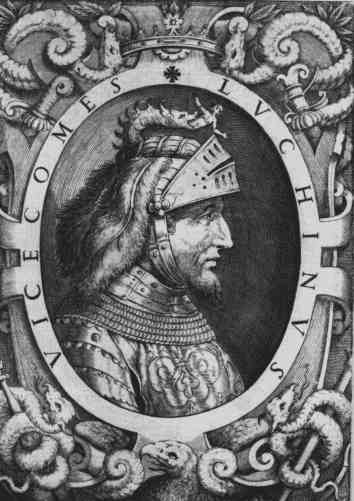
Lodrisio Visconti, defeated the Company of Saint George of Werner von Urslingen at the Battle of Parabiago in Lombardy in 1339.

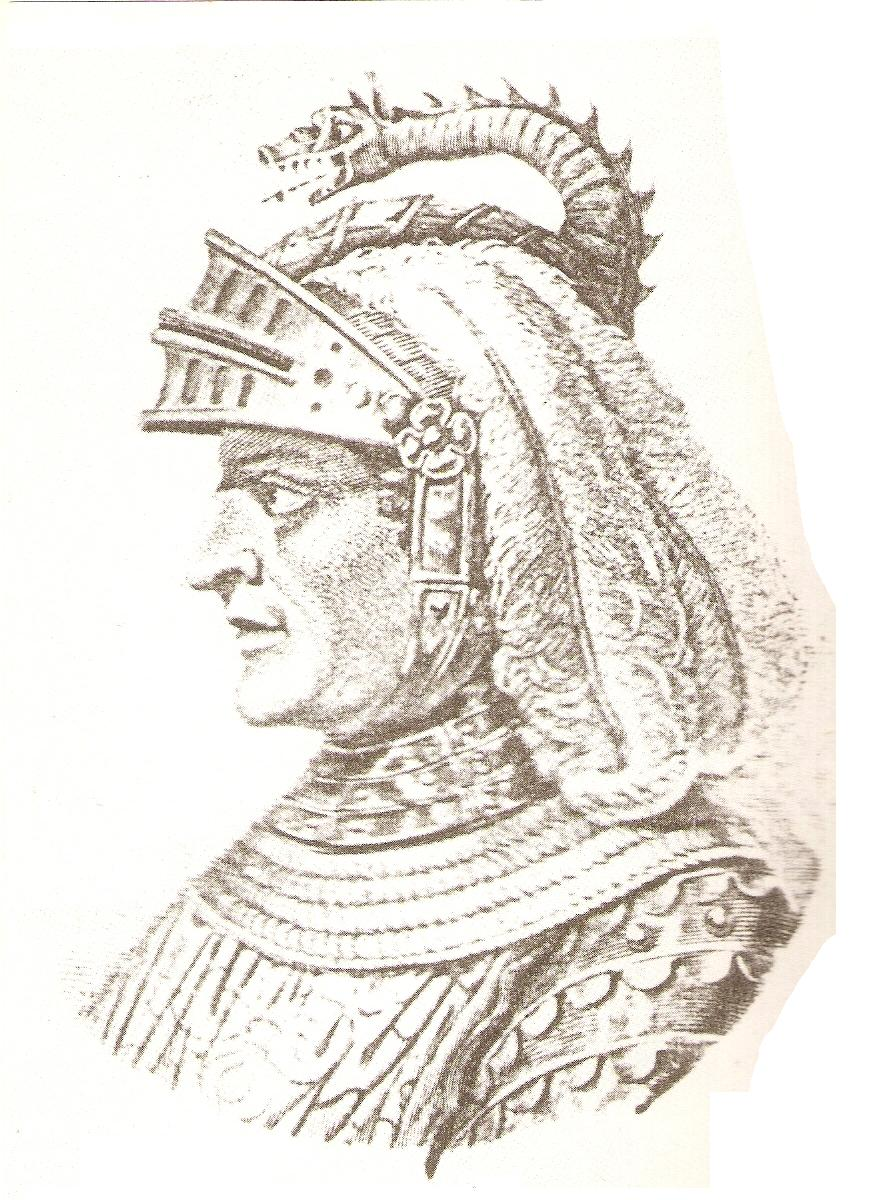
Alberico da Barbiano, a mercenary alongside John Hawkwood, founded the Company of St. George, and reached acclaim by defeating the Breton company of anti-pope Clement VII at Marino in 1379.

== Sources ==
- Machiavelli, Niccolò. History of Florence. book I, ch. vii. (on-line text)
- Rendina, Claudio (1992). I Capitani di ventura. Newton Compton.
- Ricotti, Ercole (1844–1845). Storia delle compagnie di ventura in Italia, 4 vols.
- Lenman, B., Anderson, T., eds. (2000). Chambers Dictionary of World History, Edinburgh: Chambers Harrap Publishers Ltd. ISBN 0-550-13000-4.
- Mallett, Michael (1974). Mercenaries and their Masters: Warfare in Renaissance Italy. London: The Bodley Head. ISBN 0-370-10502-8.
