= Compagnia di San Giorgio =

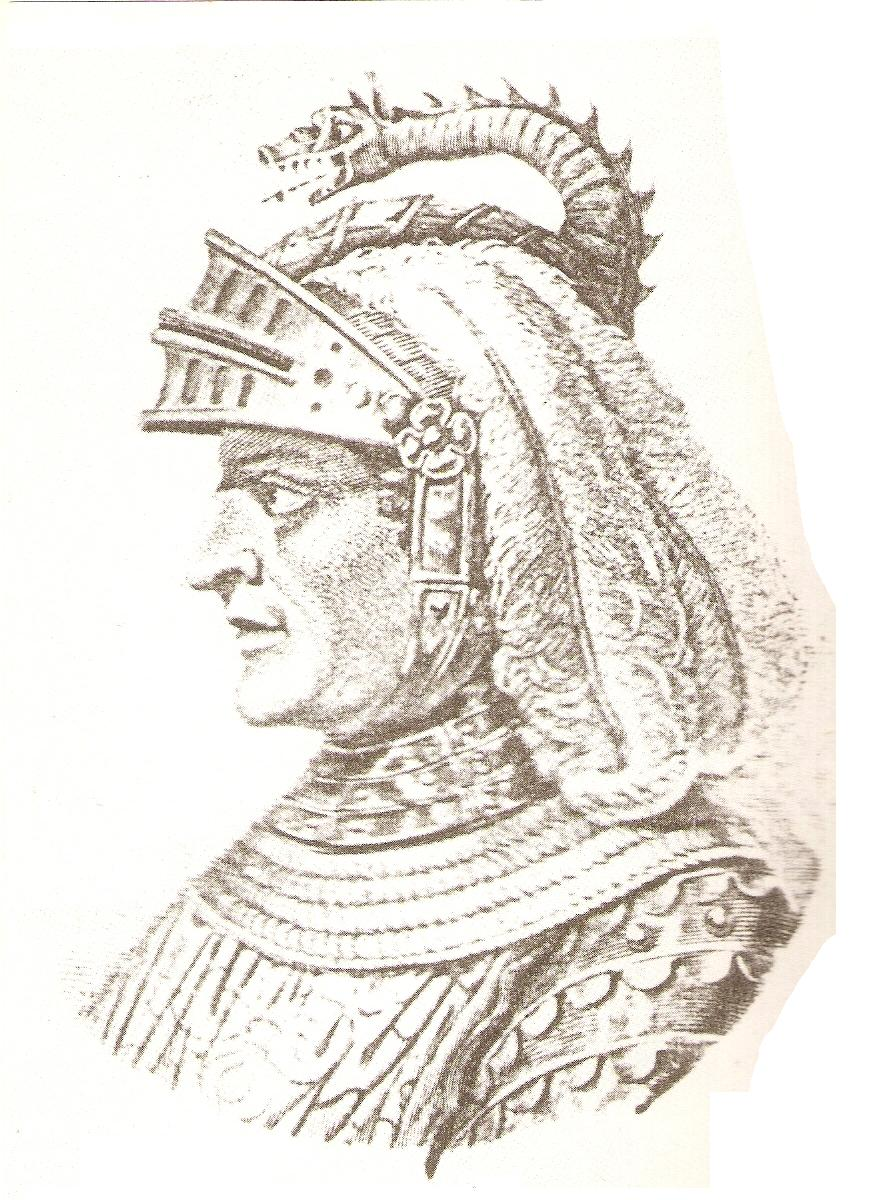
Portrait of Alberico da Barbiano

The Compagnia di San Giorgio (English: "Company of Saint George") was the name of several companies of mercenaries in Italy during the 14th century.

A first company under this name was founded in 1339 by Lodrisio Visconti, usurper of the title of lord of Seprio in northern Italy. It included some 6,500 men. Some were paid by Mastino II della Scala, lord of Verona and hirer of Lodrisio. Others were foreign mercenaries – German knights, Swiss infantry, and men from Graubünden – under the leadership of Germans Konrad von Landau and Werner von Urslingen. Personnel were also sent by Visconti's allies: Calcino Tornielli, lord of Novara; Louis, son of Aymon of Savoy; Obizzo III d'Este of Ferrara; Ludovico I Gonzaga of Mantua; Thomas II of Saluzzo; Taddeo Pepoli of Bologna; and Bertram, Patriarch of Aquileia. Lodrisio and his army were defeated in the Battle of Parabiago; some of the survivors ravaged the area until they were crushed by Lodrisio's victorious uncle, Luchino Visconti.

In 1365 another Visconti, Ambrogio, an illegitimate son of Bernabò Visconti, founded another company with the same name, but it soon vanished. He reformed it in 1372, but two years later it was destroyed in a riot in the Bargamasco, in which Ambrogio himself was killed.

In 1377 Alberico da Barbiano, one of the main Italian condottieri, founded the most successful of the three Compagnie di San Giorgio. The company included other famous condottieri, such as Muzio Attendolo, Braccio da Montone, Ugolotto Biancardo, Jacopo dal Verme, Facino Cane, and Ottobuono de' Terzi. The company's membership was restricted to Italians, a remarkable feature in a time in which most mercenaries in Italy were foreigners. The reason for this decision by Barbiano is not clear, but perhaps it came after he saw the atrocities of foreign mercenaries under John Hawkwood during the so-called Cesena Bloodbath of 1377. The company helped Pope Urban VI against Antipope Clement VII, defeating a Breton mercenary army at Marino in 1379. Later it fought for Charles of Durazzo in his conquest of the Kingdom of Naples.
