= Fra Moriale =

Provençal mercenary

Jean Montréal du Bar (1315 ? –August 1354), also known as Fra Moriale or Montréal de Albarno, was a Provençal mercenary and condottiero.

== Life ==
Montreal de Albarno was born at Le Bar-sur-Loup. He came from the aristocratic family "maison de Grasse" which was one of the oldest and wealthiest families in Provence. Le Bar-sur-Loup was previously known as Albarno.

He arrived in Italy in 1331, and, like his uncle, Isnard de Albarno, became a member of the military Order of Knights Hospitaller, better known now as the Knights of Malta. His name Italianized was "Moriale" and Fra came from the fact that he was from a religious order. He fought for Louis I of Hungary in the succession wars for the Kingdom of Naples. Later he was hired by the Papal States, but he abandoned them due to insufficient payment.

The King of Hungary made him his vicar and gave him the castle of Aversa. Along with Corrado Lupo, head of a company of 7000 men, they became the two foreign commanders of the Hungarian forces. With the war over the Kingdom of Naples succession ended, Montréal was sent by King Louis I of Hungary to Genova and then he brought him to Hungary as the Prior of Vrana. Moriale refounded the Great Company with German, Italian and Provençal mercenaries.

Luigi di Taranto cited Moriale to the court of the Vicariate, where Moriale was condemned in absentia. In 1352, Joanna I of Naples sent Galeotto I Malatesta of Rimini, to besiege him in Aversa, where Moriale had amassed a large treasure during years of pillages. Forced to surrender, he was allowed to escape alive in exchange for all his wealth. He then took service for a time with John of Viterbo and Orvieto, before forming another "Companie of adventurers".

In an attempt to rescue his brothers, Rambaud and Bertrand, who had loaned funds to Cola di Rienzi Rome, he was arrested with them by order of the Tribune Cola di Rienzo and condemned to death. He was beheaded in the Capitol Hill square on 29 August 1354, and buried in the nearby Basilica of Santa Maria in Aracoeli.

Outrage at the execution helped lead to Cola's later downfall.

== Sources ==
- Bartoli, Daniele (1668). Il torto e il diritto del non si può. Rome/Varese.
- Ricotti, Ercole (1929). Storia delle compagnie di ventura in Italia. Athena.
- Villani, Matteo (1846). Cronica di Matteo Villani. Firenzi. ISBN 9782912604064.
- Wright, John (1975). The Life of Cola di Rienzo. Toronto.
