= Lodrisio Visconti =

Italian Condottieri

Lodrisio Visconti (c. 1280 – 1364) was an Italian condottiero and a member of the powerful Visconti dynasty. He is remembered as the first Italian military leader to organize a formal mercenary company, the Compagnia di San Giorgio ("Company of St. George"), marking a significant development in the history of Italian warfare.

== Biography ==
Born to Pietro Visconti and Antiochia Crivelli, Lodrisio received early military training under his father's guidance. He initially supported his cousin Matteo Visconti and Matteo's son Galeazzo in their efforts to reclaim Milan from the rival Torriani.

However, internal conflicts within the Visconti family soon emerged. Alongside another cousin, Marco Visconti, Lodrisio played a key role in the arrest and imprisonment of Galeazzo and his son Azzone in Monza. When the two were later released, Lodrisio fled to his fiefdom of Seprio, where he attempted to consolidate his own power.

In retaliation, Azzone laid siege to Seprio and destroyed Lodrisio's stronghold. Lodrisio managed to escape to Vicenza, where he entered the service of Mastino II della Scala, the ruler of Verona. Backed by Mastino, Lodrisio assembled a formidable mercenary force in 1339—composed primarily of Swiss soldiers—including 2,500 cavalry and 1,000 infantry. This unit, named the Company of St. George, was the first structured mercenary company led by an Italian.

With this army, Lodrisio invaded Milanese territory but was decisively defeated at the Battle of Parabiago in early February 1339. He was captured and, together with his son Ambrogio, confined in an iron cage within the castle of San Colombano. He remained imprisoned for a decade.

Lodrisio was eventually released by Giovanni Visconti, archbishop and new lord of Milan, who was also his cousin. Later, under Giovanni's nephew Galeazzo II, Lodrisio was entrusted with leading troops in the campaign to reclaim Piedmont. He notably distinguished himself in the Visconti victory of 1356 against the anti-Visconti league, which had employed the Grand Company led by Konrad von Landau.

Lodrisio spent his final years at the court of Galeazzo II and died in 1364.

== Sources ==
- Mallett, Michael (2009). Mercenaries and their Masters: Warfare in Renaissance Italy. Northwestern University: Pen & Sword Military. ISBN 9781848840317.
- Rendina, Claudio (1985). I capitani di ventura. Rome: Newton Compton. ISBN 88-8289-056-2.
