= Battle of Parabiago =

1339 battle in Italy

Coordinates: 45°33′N 08°51′E

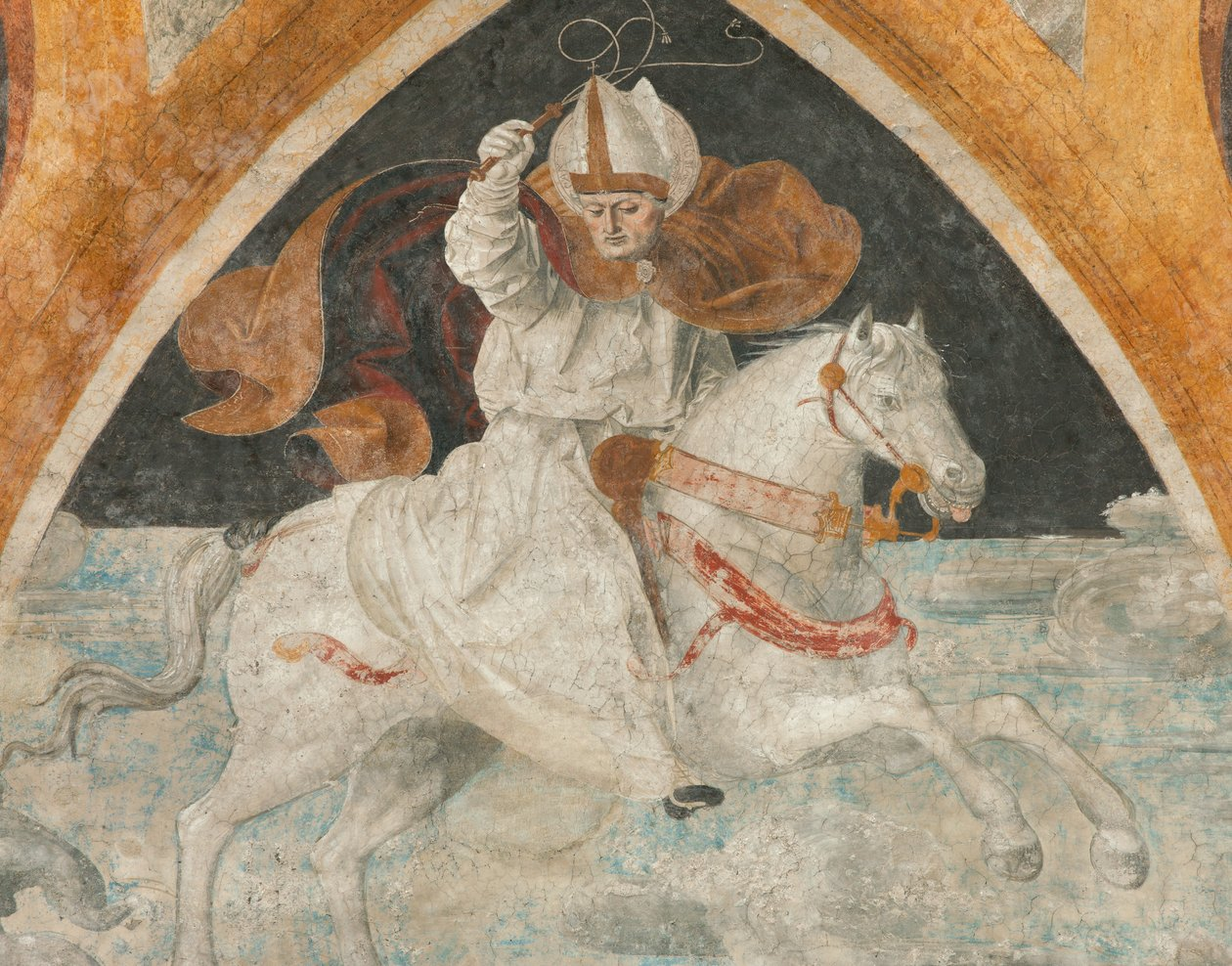
- The apparition of St. Ambrose at Parabiago; Cappella Grifi, S. Pietro in Gessate, 15th c.
Date	21 February 1339
Location	Parabiago, Lombardy, Italy
Result	Milanese victory: Usurpation crushed

Belligerents
Lordship of Milan	Lodrisio Visconti; Company of St. George

Commanders and leaders
Azzone Visconti: Luchino Visconti; Ettore da Panigo	Lodrisio Visconti P: Werner von Urslingen; Konrad von Landau

Strength
Unknown	6,500

Casualties and losses
c. 3,700	c. 3,300

The Battle of Parabiago was fought in February 1339 near Parabiago, in Lombardy, northern Italy, between the Milanese army and the St. George's (San Giorgio) Mercenaries of Lodrisio Visconti. A renowned condottiero, the latter was an exiled member of the Visconti family then in power in Milan with a kind of triumvirate formed by Azzone and his uncles, Luchino and Archbishop Giovanni Visconti. Aiming to return victoriously to his city, he hired some 2,500 knights, mainly from Germany, and 1,000 Swiss infantry which had fought in the recent unsuccessful war of Mastino II della Scala for the hegemony in northern Italy. These units were led by Werner von Urslingen and Konrad von Landau.

== Background ==
Lodrisio Visconti set out for Lombardy in late January 1339, defeating the Milanese in Rivolta d'Adda, and later conquering Cernusco sul Naviglio, Sesto di Monza, and Legnano, where he was joined by the Scaliger troops. Luchino set off to meet the Compagnia with his citizen militia and 700 knights from Savoy under the Bolognese Ettore da Panigo. Azzone, suffering from gout, remained in Milan.

== Battle ==
On 20 February 1339, with deep snow on the ground, Lodrisio's army attacked one of the two corps in which the Milanese army had divided, and which was camping near what is now the Canale Villoresi, near Parabiago. The Milanese were routed and retired to Milan with Lodrisio's troops in pursuit. Here the two main corps met and the Milanese were again defeated with Luchino captured. However, the Milanese militia did not retreat completely and offered a confused but effective resistance. In the meantime da Panigo's knights joined with some fugitives at Rho and moved to Parabiago where they defeated the 400 men-at-arms left by Lodrisio and freed Luchino.

In the meantime, news of the initial defeat reached Azzone, who ordered his men to move in and prepared to besiege Lodrisio's army. When the German mercenaries were attacked by da Panigo's men they were completely routed, and Lodrisio captured in turn.

Total casualties amounted to some 6,500–7,000.

Lodrisio Visconti was imprisoned in an iron cage in San Colombano al Lambro until 1349, when Azzone and Luchino died and Giovanni Visconti freed him.

== Legend ==
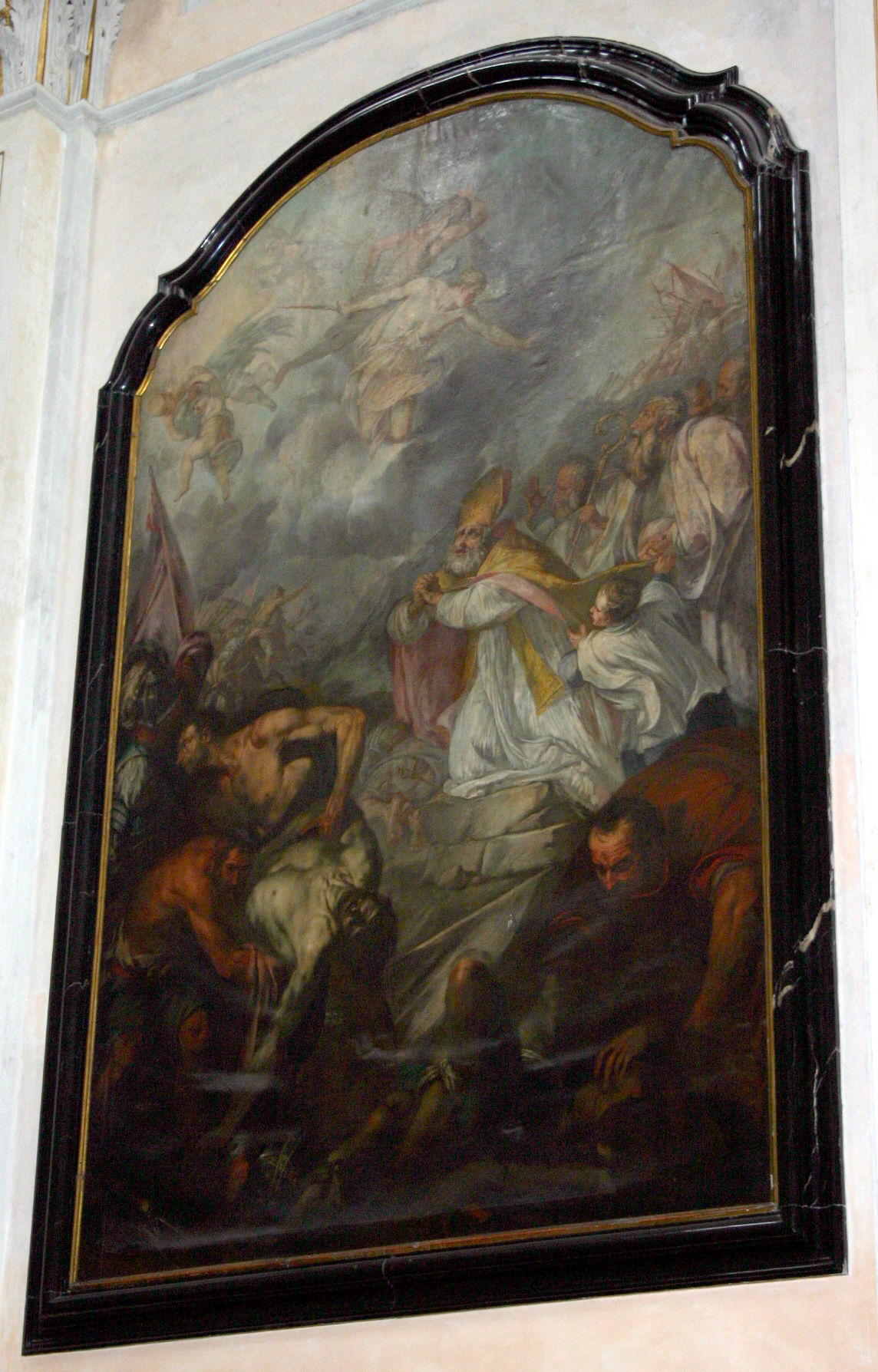
St. Ambrosius intercending for the troops of Milan during the Battle of Parabiago. Painting by Girolamo Ottolini in San Bernardino alle Ossa, Milan, Italy.

According to a legend, St. Ambrosius himself had appeared in the battle from a white cloud, riding a horse and leading the Milanese in the decisive moments. To celebrate the event, Giovanni Visconti had a church and an abbey built, called Sant'Ambrogio della Vittoria ("St. Ambrose of the Victory"). Until 1581, every February 21 a procession was held from Milan to Parabiago to remember the victory.

== See also ==
- House of Visconti

== Sources ==
- Nicolle, David (1999). Eserciti medievali italiani 1300–1500. Del Prado.
- Rendina, Claudio (1985). I capitani di ventura. Rome: Newton Compton.
- Mallett, Michael (2006). Signori e mercenari – la guerra nell'Italia del Rinasimento [Mercenaries and their masters] (in Italian). Bologna: Il Mulino. ISBN 88-15-11407-6.
