= 1521 in art =

List of years in art	(table)
- … 1511; 1512; 1513; 1514; 1515; 1516; 1517; 1518; 1519; 1520; 1521; 1522; 1523; 1524; 1525; 1526; 1527; 1528; 1529; 1530; 1531 …
- Art; Archaeology; Architecture; Literature; Music; Philosophy; Science; +...

Events from the year 1521 in art.

== Events ==
- Art and artifacts seized by the Spanish from Mexico are distributed and displayed in Europe this year. After seeing items on display in Brussels, Albrecht Dürer writes in his diary, "I also saw the things that were brought to the King from the new land of gold: a sun entirely of gold, a whole fathom wide, and a moon entirely of silver, of equal size, likewise two rooms of rare accoutrements, of all manner of their weapons, armour, bows and arrows, wonderful arms, strange garments, bed hangings and all manner of wonderful things for many uses, all much fairer to behold than any marvel. These things are all so precious that they are valued at one hundred thousand guilders. And in all the days of my life I have seen nothing that has so rejoiced my heart as these things. For I saw among them strange and exquisitely worked objects and marvelled at the subtle genius of the men in distant lands. The things I saw there I have no words to express."

== Works ==
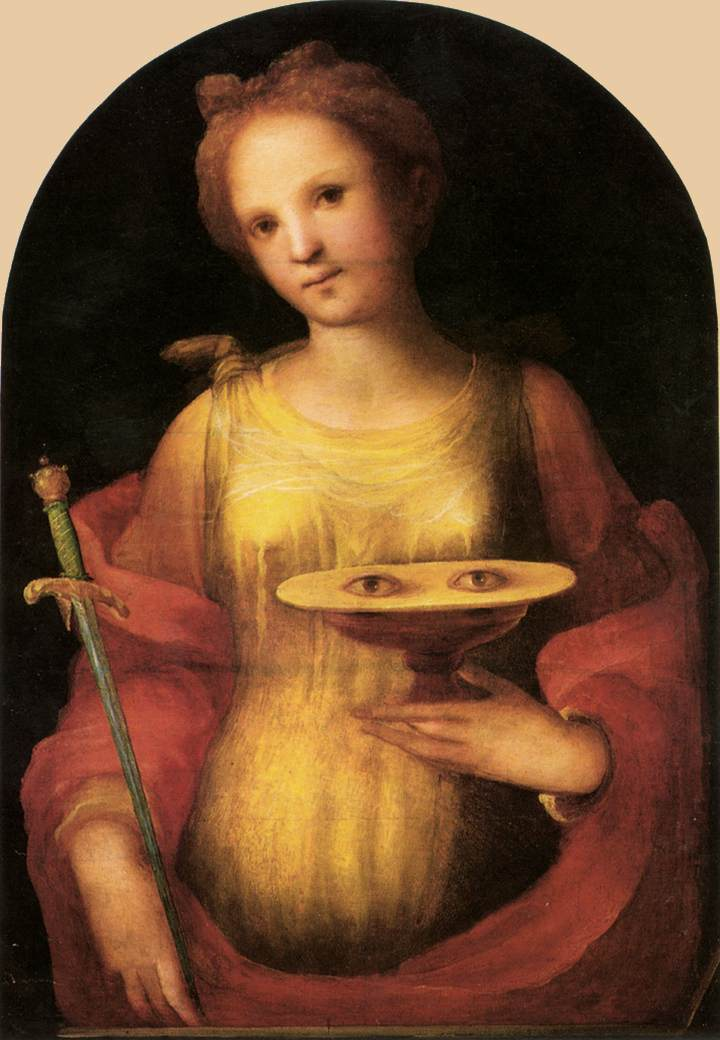
di Pace Beccafumi – Saint Lucy

- Albrecht Altdorfer – Birth of the Virgin
- Domenico di Pace Beccafumi
  - The Mystical Marriage of Saint Catherine (Hermitage Museum (Saint Petersburg))
  - Saint Lucy (Pinacoteca Nazionale (Siena))
- Antonio da Correggio – Head of Christ
- Albrecht Dürer – Portrait of Lucas van Leyden (drawing)
- Hans Holbein the Younger – murals for the Council Chamber of Basel Town Hall (begun)
- Rosso Fiorentino – Allegory of Salvation with the Virgin, the Christ Child, Saint Elizabeth, the Young Saint John, and Two Angels
- Gasparo Sacchi – San Francesco in Tavola altarpiece in Bologna
- Bernard van Orley – Triptych of Virtue of Patience ("Job altarpiece") (commissioned)

== Births ==
- date unknown
  - Joost Janszoon Bilhamer, Dutch sculptor, engraver, and cartographer (died 1590)
  - Antoine Caron, French master glassmaker, illustrator, Mannerist painter and a master (teacher) at the School of Fontainebleau (died 1599)
  - Marco Pino, Italian painter of the Renaissance and Mannerist period (died 1583)
  - Girolamo Siciolante da Sermoneta, Italian Mannerist painter active in Rome (died 1580)
  - Xu Wei, Ming Chinese painter, poet and dramatist (died 1593)

== Deaths ==
- March 7 - Benedetto Buglioni, Italian sculptor in glazed terracotta (born 1459/1460)
- July 9 - Raffaele Riario, Italian cardinal and patron of Michelangelo (born 1461)
- date unknown
  - Andrea di Aloigi, Italian painter (born 1480)
  - Jean Bourdichon, French miniature painter and manuscript illuminator (born 1457/1459)
  - Jörg Syrlin the Younger, German sculptor (born 1455)
- probable
  - Hans Brüggemann, German sculptor (born 1480)
  - Henning von der Heide, German late Gothic sculptor (born 1460)
