= 1522 in art =

List of years in art	(table)
- … 1512; 1513; 1514; 1515; 1516; 1517; 1518; 1519; 1520; 1521; 1522; 1523; 1524; 1525; 1526; 1527; 1528; 1529; 1530; 1531; 1532 …
- Art; Archaeology; Architecture; Literature; Music; Philosophy; Science; +...

Events from the year 1522 in art.

== Works ==
- Antonio da Correggio completes the frescoes of the Vision of St. John on Patmos in the church of San Giovanni Evangelista (Parma).
- Benedikt Dreyer completes a Gothic altar called the "Antonius altar" for the Burg church in Lübeck.
- Titian completes the Averoldi Polyptych for the Santi Nazaro e Celso (Brescia).
- Bernard van Orley completes a triptych for the Brotherhood of the Holy Cross in a chapel of the Saint Walburga church in Veurne.

=== Painting ===
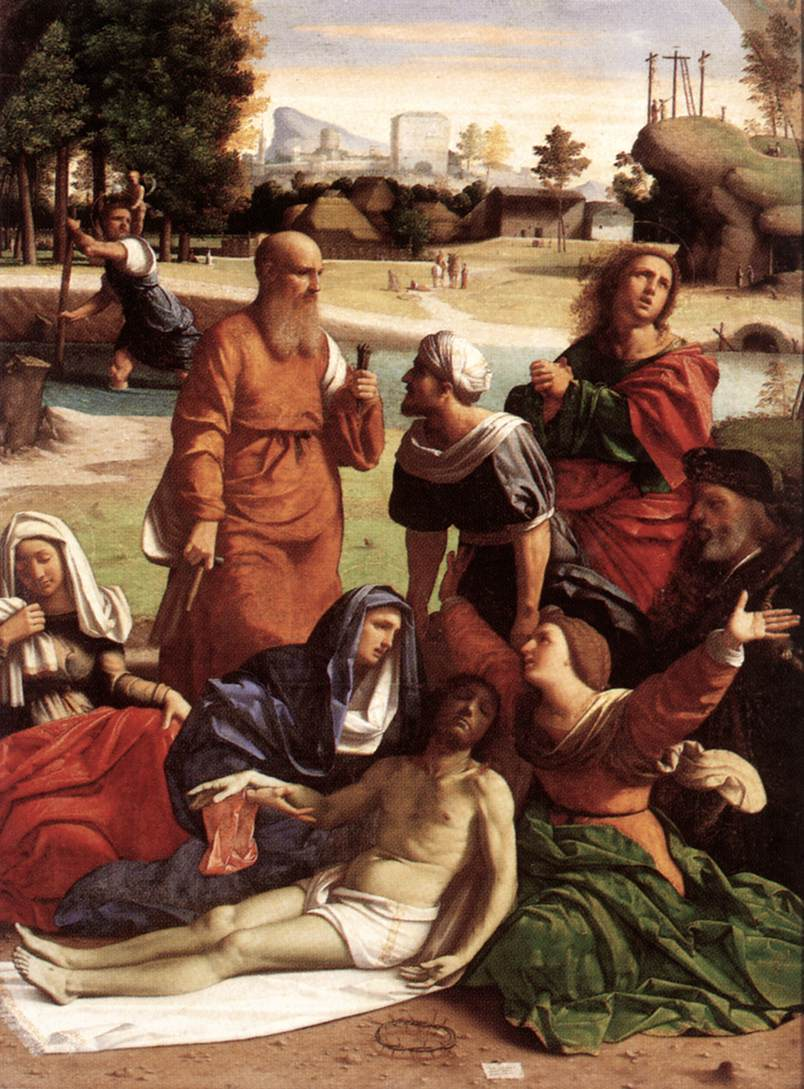
Ortolano – Mourning the Dead Christ

- Hans Baldung – The Stoning of Saint Stephen
- Hans Holbein – The Body of the Dead Christ in the Tomb
- Ludovico Mazzolino
  - Christ and the Woman Taken in Adultery
  - Madonna and Child with St. Joseph
- Ortolano Ferrarese – Mourning the Dead Christ (Galleria Borghese, Rome)
- Lucas van Leyden – Virgin and Child with the Magdalene and a Donor

== Births ==
- Antonio Campi, Italian painter (died 1587)
- Bernardino Campi, Italian Renaissance painter (died 1591)
- Dirck Volckertszoon Coornhert, Dutch writer, engraver, philosopher, translator, politician and theologian (died 1590)
- Federico Brandani, Italian sculptor and stuccoist who worked in an urbane Mannerist style as a court artist (died 1575)
- Jean Cousin the Younger, French painter, sculptor (died 1595)
- Pietro Marescalchi, Italian Renaissance painter (died 1589)
- Ludger Tom Ring the Younger, German painter and draughtsman (died 1584)

== Deaths ==
- Giovanni Antonio Amadeo, Italian early Renaissance sculptor, architect and engineer (born c. 1447)
- Paolo Moranda Cavazzola, Italian painter active mainly in his hometown of Verona (born 1486)
- Piero di Cosimo, Florentine painter (born 1462)
- Fiorenzo di Lorenzo, Italian painter of the Umbrian school (born 1440)
- (died 1522-1532): Colijn de Coter, early Netherlandish painter who produced mainly altarpieces (born 1440/1445)
