= 1590 in art =

List of years in art	(table)
- … 1580; 1581; 1582; 1583; 1584; 1585; 1586; 1587; 1588; 1589; 1590; 1591; 1592; 1593; 1594; 1595; 1596; 1597; 1598; 1599; 1600 …
- Art; Archaeology; Architecture; Literature; Music; Philosophy; Science; +...

Events from the year 1590 in art.

== Events ==
- Gian Paolo Lomazzo produces his critical treatise Idea del tempio della pittura ("The ideal temple of painting").

== Works ==
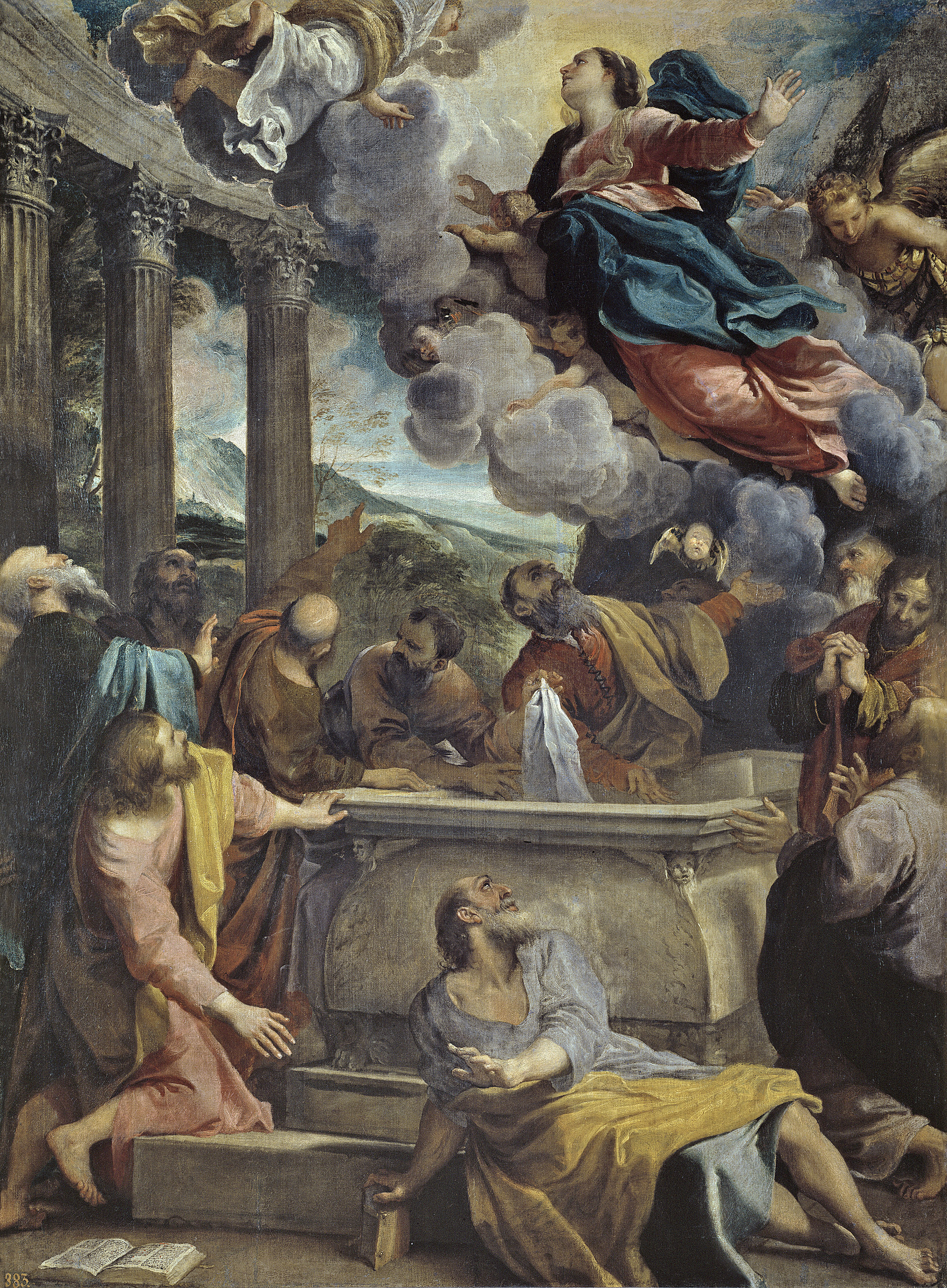
Assumption of the Virgin (1590) by Annibale Carracci

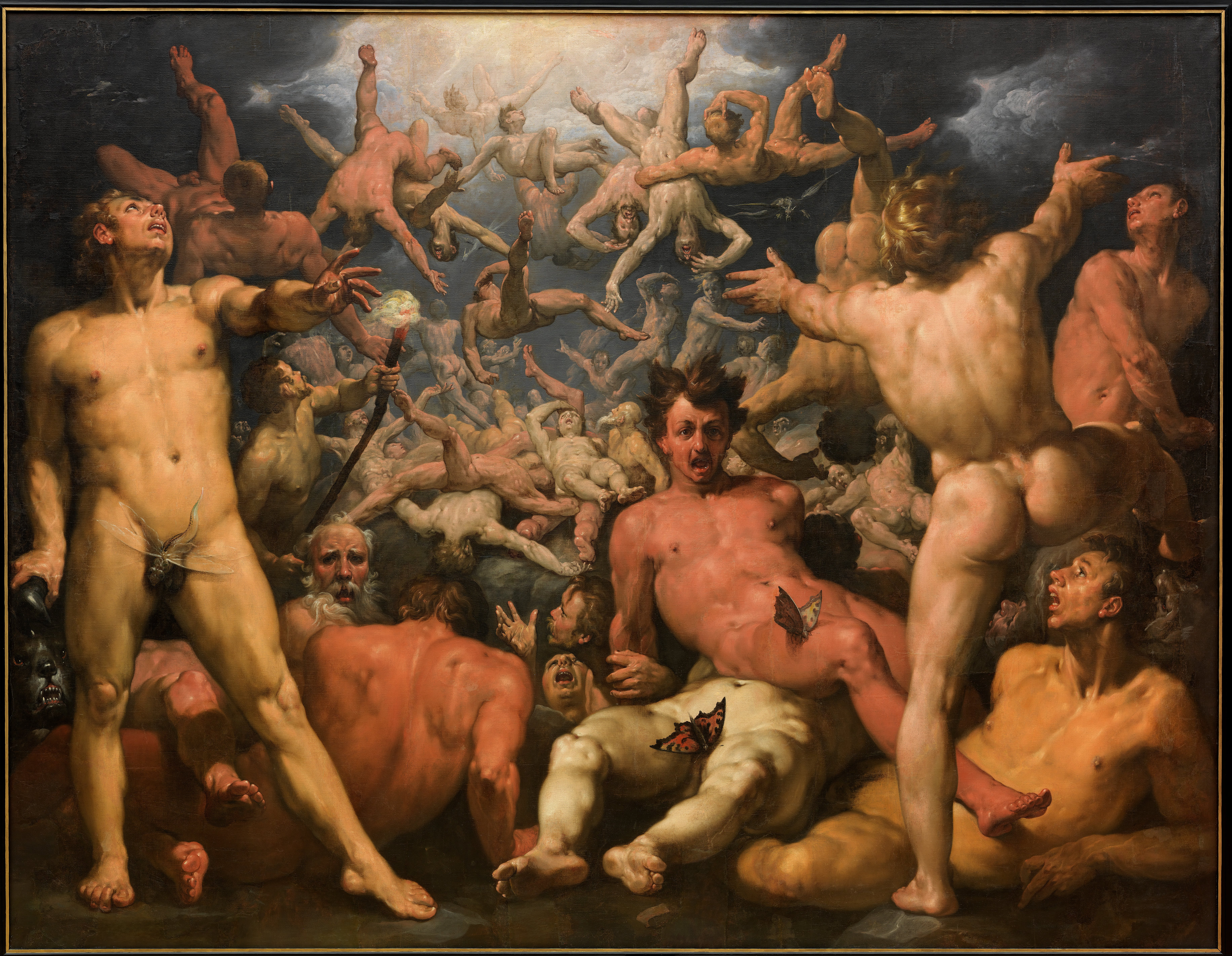
The Fall of the Titans (1588–1590) by Cornelis van Haarlem

- Federico Barocci - Christ and Mary Magdalen (Noli me tangere)
- Annibale Carracci
  - Assumption of the Virgin (Museo del Prado, Madrid)
  - The Beaneater (latest likely date)
- Antonio Circignani - Frescoes of the finding of the True Cross (Basilica of Santa Croce in Gerusalemme, Rome)
- Hendrick de Clerck - Anne with the Virgin and Child (for Kapellekerk, Brussels; now in Royal Museums of Fine Arts of Belgium there, inventory 53)
- Lavinia Fontana - Portrait of Gerolamo Mercuriale (approximate date)
- School of Fontainebleau - Gabrielle d'Estrees with a Sister
- Palma il Giovane - Francesco St Jerome, rare oil painting on copper
- Hasegawa Tōhaku - Shōrin-zu byōbu "Pine Trees" inkwash
- Cornelis van Haarlem – The Fall of the Titans (1588–1590)
- Crispin van den Broeck - Two Young Men

== Births ==
- March 25 (bapt.) - Andries van Eertvelt, Flemish Baroque painter, primarily sea scenes (died 1652)
- December 3 - Daniel Seghers, Jesuit brother and Flemish Baroque painter who specialized in flower still lifes (died 1661)
- date unknown
  - Bartholomeus van Bassen, Dutch painter (died 1652)
  - Jacopo Barbello, Italian painter (died 1656)
  - Didier Barra, French Renaissance painter (died 1656)
  - Christoffel van den Berghe, Dutch painter of the Baroque period (died 1645)
  - Gregorio Bausá, Spanish painter (died 1656)
  - Juan Bautista de Espinosa, Spanish still life painter (died 1641)
  - Luciano Borzone, Italian painter with an antique style (died 1645)
  - Giovanni Bernardo Carlone, Italian painter of the late-Mannerist and early-Baroque periods (died 1630)
  - Bartolomeo Cavarozzi, Italian caravaggisti painter of the Baroque period active in Spain (died 1625)
  - Giovanni Battista Coriolano, Italian engraver (died 1649)
  - Felipe Diricksen, Spanish Baroque painter primarily of portraits and religious paintings (died 1679)
  - Giovanni Battista Discepoli, crippled Italian painter (died 1660)
  - Caterina Ginnasi, Italian painter of altarpieces for the church of Santa Lucia alle Botteghe Oscure (died 1660)
  - Michel Lasne, French engraver, draughtsman and collector (died 1667)
  - Floris van Schooten, Dutch painter (died 1655)
  - Raffaello Vanni, Italian painter for churches (died 1657)
  - Cornelis Verbeeck, Dutch painter (died 1637)
- probable
  - Angelica Veronica Airola, Italian painter (died 1670)
  - Camillo Berlinghieri, Italian painter of the Baroque period (died 1635)
  - Giovanni Campino, Italian painter from Camerino (died 1650)
  - Abraham de Vries, Dutch painter (died 1655)
  - Paolo Domenico Finoglia, Italian painter of the early-Baroque period (died 1645)
  - Esteban March, Spanish painter (died 1660)
  - Daniël Mijtens, Dutch portrait painter (died 1647/1648)
  - Mario Righetti, Italian painter active in his native Bologna (d. unknown)

== Deaths ==
- February 3 - Germain Pilon, French sculptors of the French Renaissance (born 1537)
- April 22 - Sigmund Feyerabend, German bookseller and wood-engraver (born 1528)
- July 22 - Leone Leoni, Italian sculptor and medallist (born 1509)
- October 12 - Kanō Eitoku, Japanese painter of the Azuchi-Momoyama period, patriarchs of the Kanō school of Japanese painting (born 1543)
- October 29 - Dirck Coornhert, Dutch writer, engraver, philosopher, translator, politician and theologian (born 1522)
- November 8 - Joost Janszoon Bilhamer, Dutch sculptor, engraver, and cartographer (born 1521)
- date unknown
  - Cesare Baglioni, Italian painter specializing in quadratura (born 1525)
  - Miguel Barroso, Spanish painter (born 1538)
  - Wouter Crabeth I, Dutch glass painter (born 1510)
  - Bernaert de Rijckere, Flemish painter (born 1535)
  - Jacob Grimmer, Flemish landscape painter (born 1526)
  - Girolamo Lombardo, Italian sculptor (born 1506)
  - Domenico Poggini, Italian sculptor and engraver (born 1520)
  - Marietta Robusti, Venetian painter of the Renaissance period (born 1560)
- probable - Marcus Gheeraerts the Elder, Flemish printmaker and painter associated with the English court of the mid-16th Century (born 1520)
