= 1520 in art =

| List of years in art | (table) |
- … 1510; 1511; 1512; 1513; 1514; 1515; 1516; 1517; 1518; 1519; 1520; 1521; 1522; 1523; 1524; 1525; 1526; 1527; 1528; 1529; 1530 …
- Art; Archaeology; Architecture; Literature; Music; Philosophy; Science; +...

Events from the year 1520 in art.

== Events ==
- Considered the start of the Mannerism art period
- The oldest known painting depicting Stockholm is painted in the church of Storkyrkan.

== Works ==
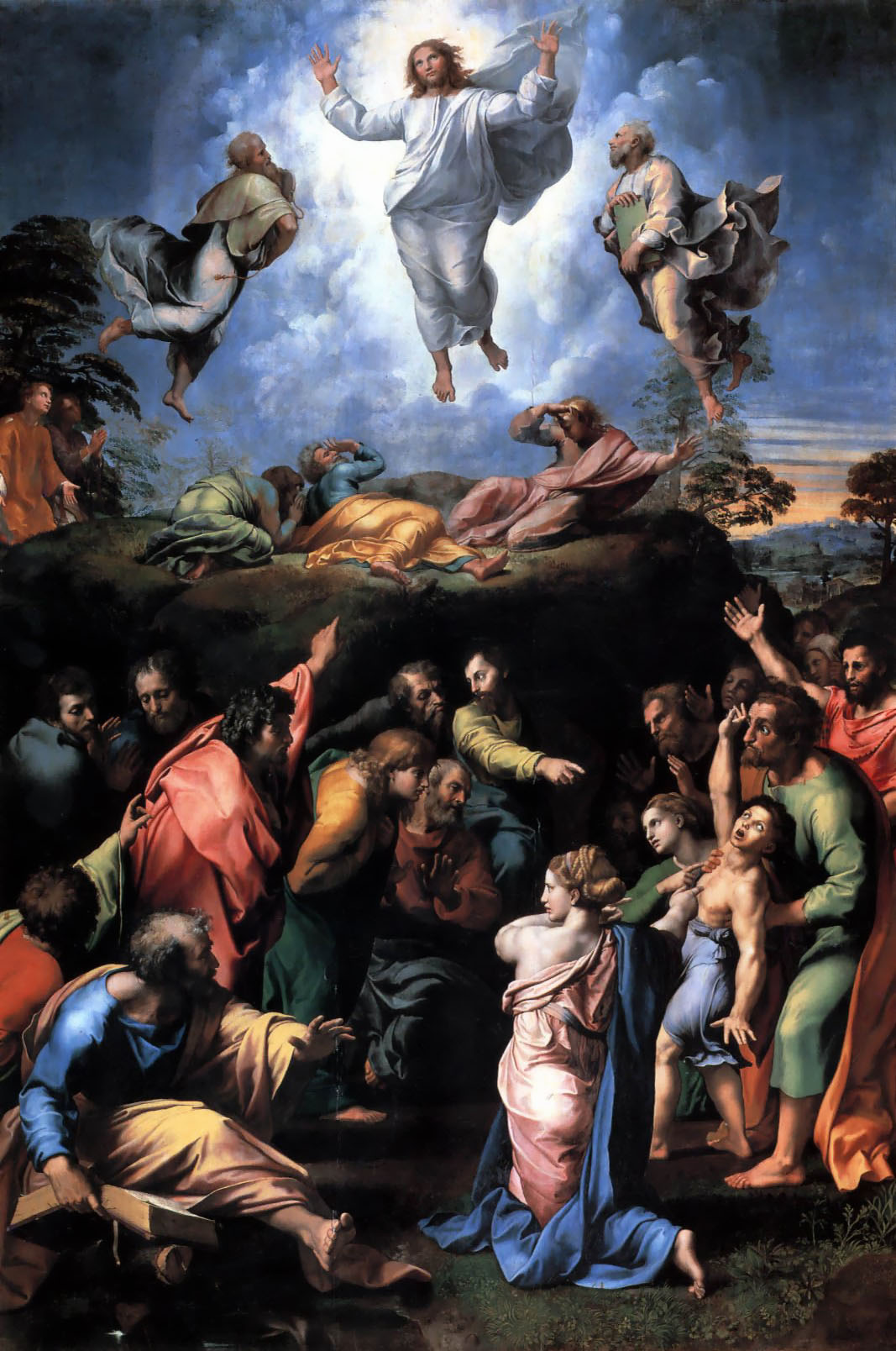
Raphael's Transfiguration as left at the artist's death this year

=== Painting ===
- Albrecht Altdorfer – Departure of Saint Florian
- Domenico Campagnola – Gerolamo
- Gerard David – The Virgin and Child in a landscape (approximate date)
- Gerard David or circle of Jan Mabuse – Our Lady of the Fly (approximate date)
- Il Garofalo – Ascension of Christ
- Quentin Matsys – Portrait of a woman
- Francesco Melzi – Flora
- Raphael – Transfiguration
- Titian – Venus Anadyomene (approximate date)
- Lucas van Leyden – Lot and his Daughters (approximate date)
- Jan van Scorel – Sippenaltar
- Pseudo Jan Wellens de Cock – Calvary (approximate date)
- Portrait of Francis I of France (completed by this date)

== Births ==
- February 23 (baptised) - Ercole Procaccini the Elder, Italian painter mainly active in Milan (died 1595)
- June 29 - Nicolás Factor, Spanish painter of the Renaissance period (died 1583)
- date unknown
  - Gaspar Becerra, Spanish painter and sculptor (died 1570)
  - Leonardo Brescia, Italian painter (died 1582)
  - Mirabello Cavalori, Italian painter mainly active in Florence (died 1572)
  - Claudio de Arciniega, Spanish sculptor and architect (died 1593)
  - Giacomo del Duca, Italian sculptor (died 1601)
  - Étienne Dupérac, French painter, draughtsman and engraver, topographer and antiquarian (died 1607)
  - Giorgio Ghisi, Italian engraver from Mantua (died 1582)
  - David Kandel, Strasbourg-born botanical illustrator (died 1592)
  - Domenico Poggini, Italian sculptor (died 1590)
  - Giuseppe Porta, Italian painter active mainly in Venice (died 1575)
  - Martin Van Cleve, Flemish painter of the Van Cleve family (died 1570)
- probable
  - Hans Eworth, Flemish painter (died 1574)
  - Marcus Gheeraerts the Elder, Flemish printmaker and painter associated with the English court of the mid-16th Century (died 1590)
  - Francesco Imparato, Italian painter active mainly in his natal city of Naples (died 1570)
  - Girolamo Porro, Italian engraver on wood and on copper (died unknown)
  - Martino Rota, Croatian artist and printmaker (died 1583)
  - Hugues Sambin, French sculptor and woodworker (died 1601)
  - (born 1520/1524): Giovanni Battista Moroni, Italian painter of the mannerist period (died 1579)

== Deaths ==
- April 6 - Raphael, Italian painter and architect of the High Renaissance (born 1483)
- April 11 - Agostino Chigi, Italian banker and patron of the arts (born 1466)
- December 6 - Bartolomé Ordóñez, Spanish sculptor (born 1480)
- date unknown
  - Raffaello Botticini - Italian Renaissance painter (born 1474)
  - Sheikh Hamdullah, Ottoman master of Islamic calligraphy (born 1436)
  - Sultan Ali Mashhadi, Persian calligrapher and poet (born 1453)
  - Marx Reichlich, Austrian painter of primarily religious scenes (born 1460)
  - Niccolo Rondinelli, Italian painter active mainly in Ravenna (born 1468)
