= 1642 in art =

List of years in art	(table)
- … 1632; 1633; 1634; 1635; 1636; 1637; 1638; 1639; 1640; 1641; 1642; 1643; 1644; 1645; 1646; 1647; 1648; 1649; 1650; 1651; 1652 …
- Art; Archaeology; Architecture; Literature; Music; Philosophy; Science; +...

Events from the year 1642 in art.

== Events ==
- Isaack Gilsemans, the artist on Abel Tasman's expedition, produces the first European work of art made in New Zealand.
- Roman painter Giovanni Baglione publishes The Lives of Painters, Sculptors, Architects and Engravers, active from 1572–1642 (Le Vite de’ Pittori, scultori, architetti, ed Intagliatori dal Pontificato di Gregorio XII del 1572 fino a’ tempi de Papa Urbano VIII nel 1642).

== Paintings ==
Rembrandt - The Night Watch

- Philippe de Champaigne – Portrait of Cardinal Richelieu
- Georges de La Tour - Joseph the Carpenter
- Jusepe de Ribera - The Clubfoot
- William Dobson - Charles II, when Prince of Wales, with a Page (approximate date)
- Louis Le Nain - Peasant Family, or, The return from the baptism ("Happy Family")
- Rembrandt
  - The Night Watch (or The Militia Company of Captain Frans Banning Cocq)
  - Half length figure of Saskia in profile in a red hat
- Salomon van Ruysdael – River Landscape
- Gerard van Honthorst - Elizabeth Stuart, Queen of Bohemia, as a widow

== Births ==
- March 2 - Claudio Coello, Spanish Baroque painter (died 1693)
- November 11 - André Charles Boulle, French cabinetmaker known for his marquetry (died 1732)
- November 30 – Andrea Pozzo, Italian Baroque architect, decorator, stage designer, painter and art theoretician (died 1709)
- date unknown
  - Francesco Bassi, Italian painter active in the early-Baroque period (died 1732)
  - Henry Cooke, English painter (died 1700)
  - Michel Corneille the Younger, French painter, etcher and engraver (died 1708)
  - Didrik Möllerum, Finnish painter (died 1702)
  - José de Mora, Spanish sculptor (died 1724)
  - Hâfiz Osman, Ottoman calligrapher (died 1698)
  - Shitao, Chinese artist (died 1707)
  - Wang Yuanqi, Chinese painter of the Qing dynasty, member of the Four Wangs (died 1715)
- probable (born 1642/1647) - Daniel Seiter, Vienna-born fresco painter of the Baroque (died 1705)

== Deaths ==
- March 14 - John de Critz, Flemish portrait painter active in England (born 1551/52)
- March 23 - Andries Both, Dutch genre painter (born 1612/1613), drowned in a canal in Venice
- May 6 - Frans Francken the Younger, Flemish painter (born 1581)
- June 14 - Saskia van Uylenburgh, Dutch wife and model of Rembrandt (born 1612)
- August 18 - Guido Reni, Italian painter (born 1575)
- December 6 - Willem van der Vliet, Dutch painter and uncle of Hendrick Cornelisz. van Vliet (born 1584)
- date unknown
  - Fabrizio Boschi, Italian painter of the early-Baroque period, active in Florence (born 1572)
  - Shao Mi, Chinese landscape painter, calligrapher, and poet during the Ming Dynasty (born 1592)
- probable
  - Pieter van Laer, Dutch painter of genre scenes (born 1599)
  - 1642/1643 - Wouter Abts, Flemish painter of conversation pieces and landscapes (born 1582)
