= 1584 in art =

Events from the year 1584 in art.

== Events ==
- February 27 – Merton Speiss opens a paper mill near Dassel in Saxony, origin of the Hahnemühle art paper manufacturing company.
- November 25 – The Church of the Gesù in Rome is consecrated following Giacomo della Porta's completion of the façade.

== Works ==
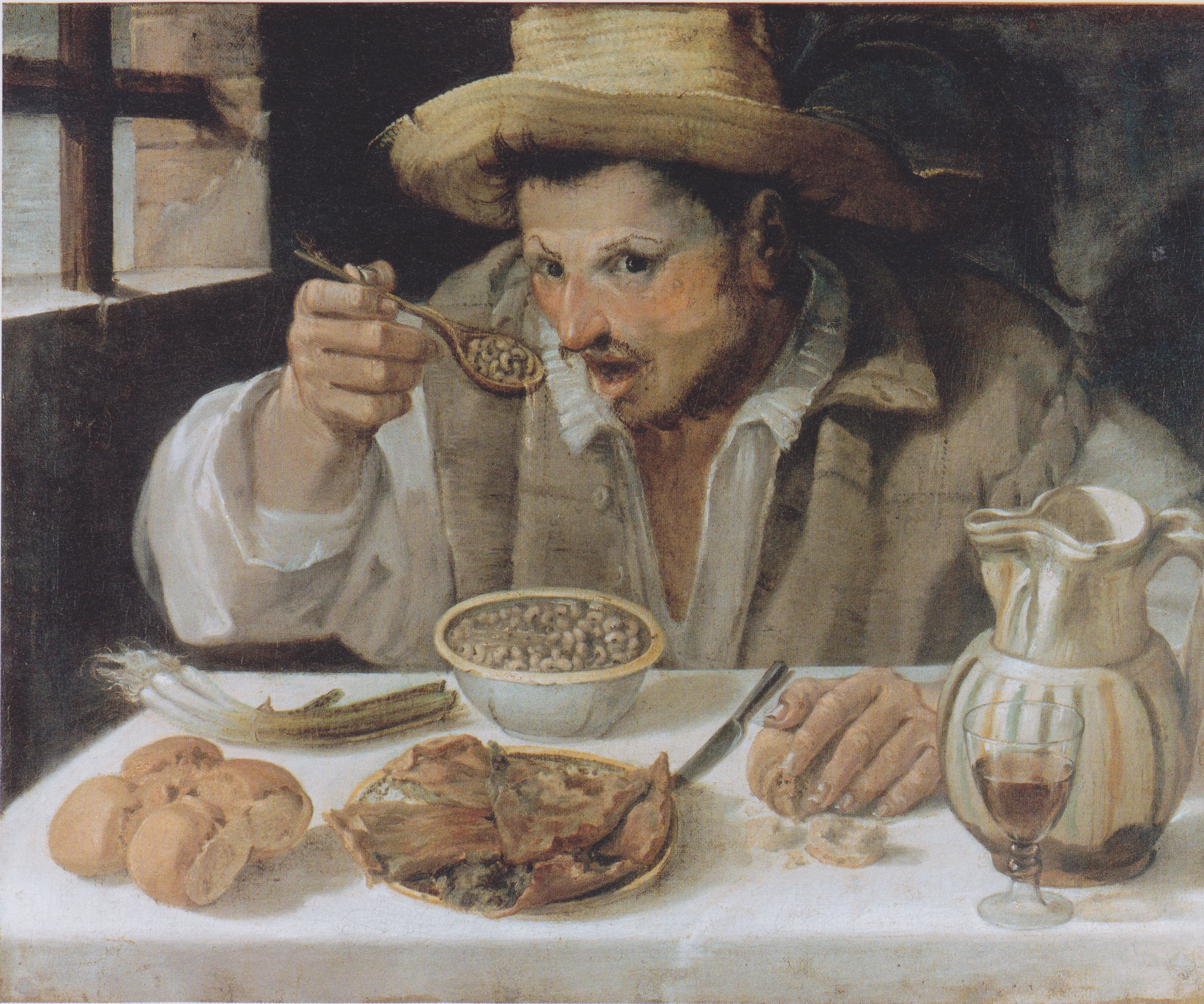
Carracci – The Beaneater

- Annibale Carracci – The Beaneater (possible date)
- Lavinia Fontana
  - Assumption of the Virgin with Saints Peter Chrysologus and Cassian
  - Portrait of the Coozzadini Family
- Matteo Perez d'Aleccio – Saint Christopher carrying the Infant Saviour on his shoulder (fresco, Seville Cathedral)
- Tintoretto – Capture of Zara from the Hungarians in 1346 amid a hurricane of missiles (Sala deilo Scrutinio, Scuola Grande di San Rocco, Venice)
- Otto van Veen – The Artist Painting, Surrounded by His Family

== Births ==
- February 2 – Anna Visscher, Dutch artist, poet and translator (died 1651)
- November 18 – Caspar de Crayer, Flemish painter (died 1669)
- date unknown
  - Pietro Francesco Alberti, Italian painter and engraver of the late-Renaissance and early-Baroque periods (died 1638)
  - Giovanni Andrea Ansaldo, Italian painter active mainly in Genoa (died 1638)
  - Giacomo Apollonio, Italian painter of the late-Renaissance and early-Baroque periods (died 1654)
  - David Bailly, Leiden artist (died 1657)
  - Cesare Bassano, Italian painter and engraver (died 1648)
  - Felice Damiani, Italian painter of religious themed works and altarpieces (died 1608)
  - Jean de Beaugrand, French lineographer and mathematician (died 1640)
  - Pieter de Valck, Dutch Golden Age painter (died 1625)
  - Cornelis de Vos, Flemish Baroque painter (died 1651)
  - Rafael Sadeler II, Flemish engraver of the Sadeler family (died 1627/1632)
  - Shōkadō Shōjō, Japanese Edo period Buddhist monk, painter, calligrapher and master of the tea ceremony (died 1639)
  - Jan Tengnagel, Dutch painter (died 1631)
  - Jacob van der Laemen, Flemish painter (died 1624)
- probable – Willem van der Vliet, Dutch painter and uncle of Hendrick Cornelisz. van Vliet (died 1642)

== Deaths ==
- January 4 – Tobias Stimmer, Swiss painter and illustrator (born 1539)
- January 30 – Pieter Pourbus, Dutch-born Flemish Renaissance painter (born 1523)
- May 22 – Ludger tom Ring the Younger, German painter and draughtsman (born 1522)
- May 25 – Prospero Spani, Italian sculptor (born 1516)
- August 29 – Lucas de Heere, Flemish portrait painter, poet and writer (born 1534)
- date unknown
  - Pieter Balten, Flemish Renaissance painter (born 1525)
  - Jacques I Androuet du Cerceau, French architect, sculptor, designer (born 1510)
  - Giovanni Filippo Criscuolo, Italian painter (born c.1500)
  - Jacques Du Brœucq, Dutch sculptor and architect (born c.1505)
  - Hu Zhengyan, Chinese artist, printmaker, calligrapher and publisher (died 1674)
  - Pierre Reymond, French enamelist (born 1513)
- probable
  - Pieter Huys, Flemish painter (born 1519)
  - Lambert Sustris, Dutch painter (born 1515/1520)
