= 1450s in art =

- 1440s
- 1450s in art
- 1460s

Art timeline

The decade of the 1450s in art involved many significant events, especially in sculpture.

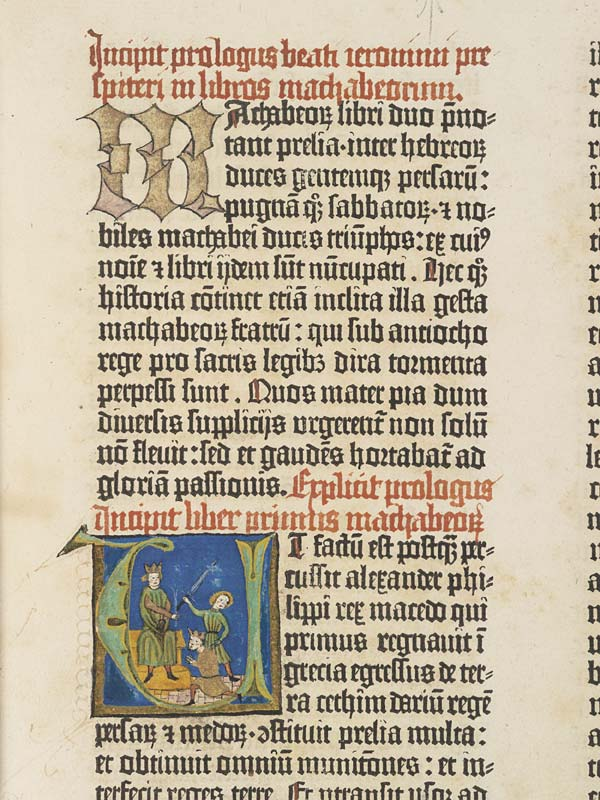
A page from the Gutenberg Bible, I Maccabees, depicting King Alexander as conqueror of Judea.

== Events ==
- 1450: Jean Fouquet creates a self-portrait which is the earliest portrait miniature, and possibly the earliest formal self-portrait (Note: Jan van Eyck's Portrait of a Man, painted 17 years earlier, is widely believed to be a self-portrait, but was not described as such in his lifetime. ("Self-portrait" as used here excludes the practice of an artist inserting a small portrait of himself into a much larger religious scene.))
- 1452: Filippo Lippi and his assistants begin work on the fresco cycle of the Stories of St. Stephen and St. John the Baptist in the Great Chapel (Cappella Maggiore) of Prato Cathedral
- 1453: Piero della Francesca begins work on the frescos of The History of the True Cross at the church of San Francesco, Arezzo
- 1454-1455: Printing of the Gutenberg Bible, the first major book printed with movable type in the western world, is completed by Johannes Gutenberg in Mainz
- 1459: Benozzo Gozzoli begins work on the Journey of the Magi to Bethlehem frescos in the Magi Chapel, Palazzo Medici Riccardi, Florence

== Paintings ==
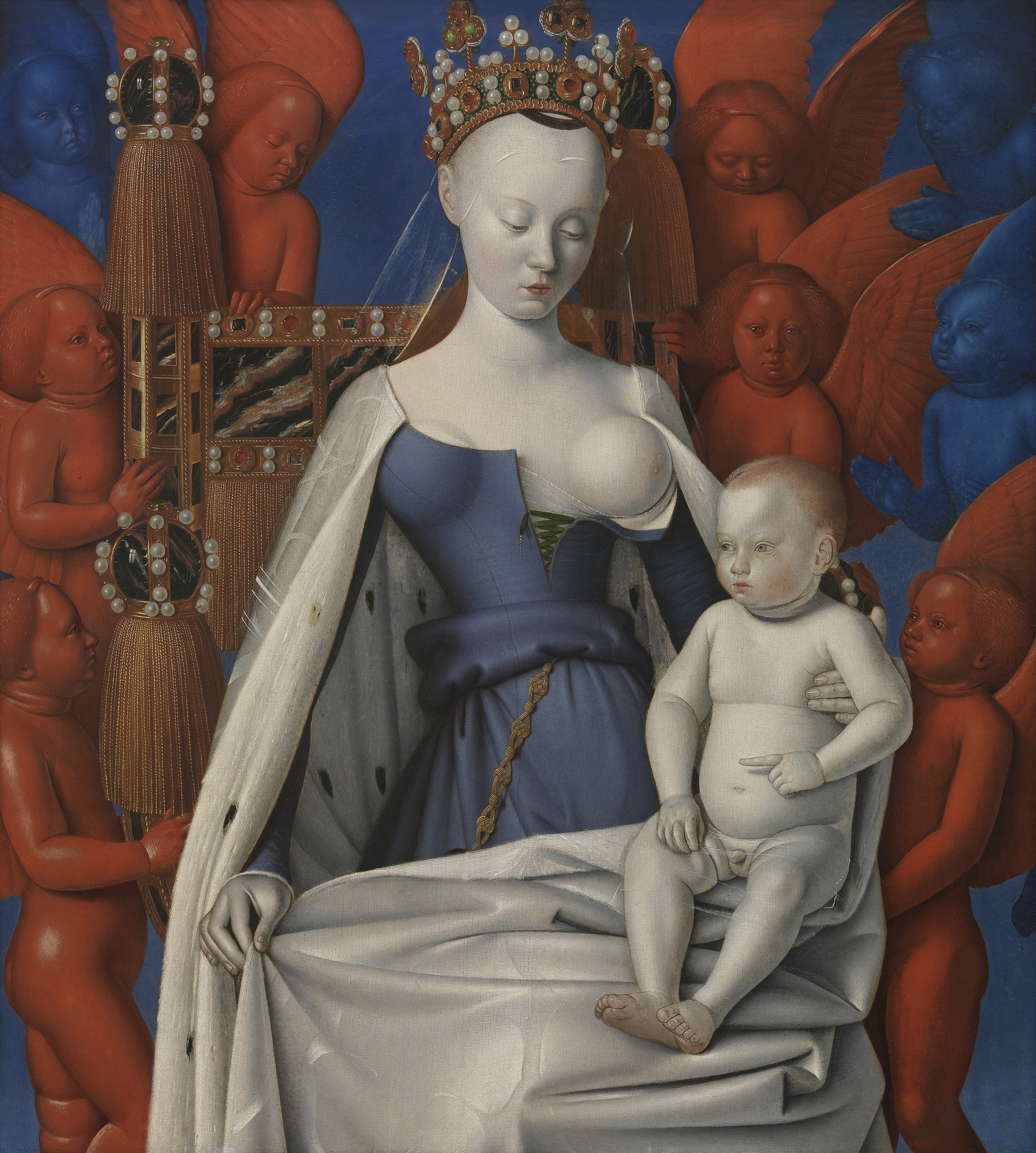
Jean Fouquet, Left side of the Melun Diptych, Virgin and Child Surrounded by Angels (c.1452) Wood, 93 x 85 cm

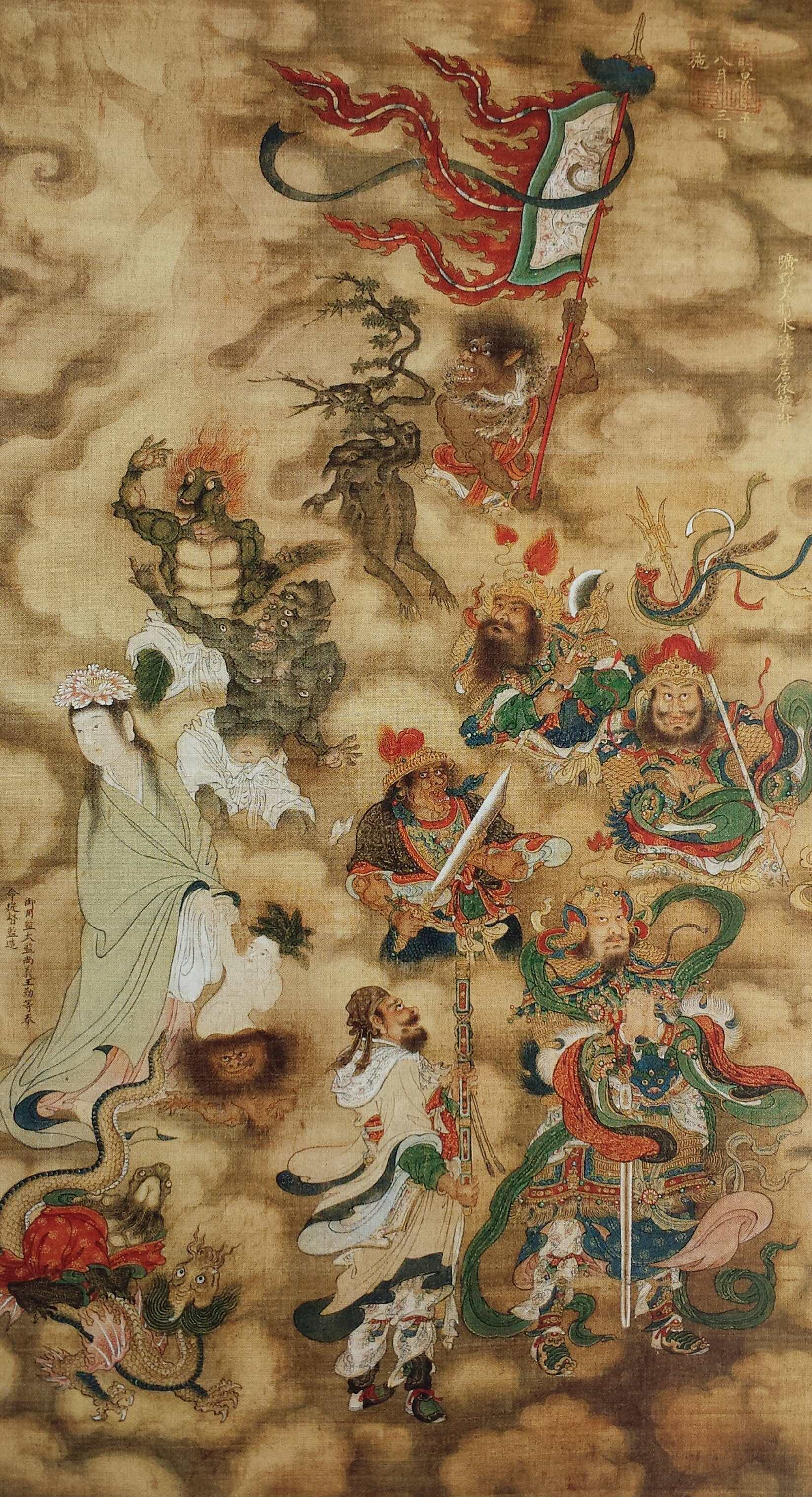
Great Generals of the Desert and the Spirits of Grasses and Trees Who Dwell in the Void of Water and Land, an example of a Chinese Shuilu ritual painting

- Giovanni Bellini
  - Crucifixion (c.1455) (Museo Correr, Venice)
  - Madonna with Child (after 1450) (Pavia)
  - Madonna with Child (c.1455) (Metropolitan Museum of Art, New York)
  - Pietà (Dead Christ Supported by the Madonna and St. John) (1455) (Accademia Carrara, Bergamo)
  - St. Jerome in the Desert (c.1455-1460) (Barber Institute of Fine Arts, Birmingham)
  - Transfiguration of Christ (first version, c.1454-1460) (Museo Correr, Venice)
- Dieric Bouts
  - Deposition Altarpiece (Royal Chapel of Granada)
  - The Entombment (completed by c.1455) (National Gallery, London)
- Petrus Christus
  - "Berlin Altar Wings" with Annunciation, Nativity, and Last Judgment (1452) (Gemäldegalerie, Berlin)
  - Virgin and Child Enthroned with St. Jerome and St. Francis (1457?) (Frankfurt)
- Antonio da Fabriano – St. Jerome in his Study (1451)
- Antonello da Messina
  - Crucifixion (two versions, c.1454-1455)
  - St. Jerome and Abraham panels (c.1455)
- Andrea del Castagno
  - Assumption of the Virgin (c.1449-1450)
  - Equestrian Statue of Niccolò da Tolentino (fresco painting, 1456) (Florence Cathedral)
- Piero della Francesca
  - Flagellation of Christ (probably 1455–1460)
  - Madonna del Parto (c.1457-1460)
  - Portrait of Sigismondo Pandolfo Malatesta (c.1451)
- Stefano di Giovanni (Sassetta) – Mystic Marriage of St. Francis (c.1450)
- Jean Fouquet – Melun Diptych (c.1452) (Royal Museum of Fine Arts, Antwerp)
- Filippo Lippi
  - Annunciation and Seven Saints (c.1449-1459) (lunettes for Palazzo Medici Riccardi, Florence; now in National Gallery, London)
  - Funeral of St. Jerome (c.1452-1460)
  - Madonna del Ceppo (1452-1453)
  - Saint Benedict Orders Saint Maurus to the Rescue of Saint Placidus (from predella c.1445-1450)
- Andrea Mantegna
  - Adoration of the Shepherds (c.1450-1451)
  - Crucifixion (1447-1459)
  - Presentation at the Temple (c.1453-1455)
  - Portrait of Cardinal Ludovico Trevisan (1459-1460)
  - St. James Led to His Execution (c.1455) (lost)
  - St. Sebastian (first version, c.1456-1459)
  - San Luca Altarpiece (1453-1454)
  - San Zeno Altarpiece (c.1457-1460)
- Paolo Uccello – The Battle of San Romano (triptych completed by c.1455)
- Shuilu ritual paintings (Chinese Ming dynasty, 1454)
- Rogier van der Weyden – The Braque Triptych (c.1452)

== Sculpture ==
- 1453: Donatello's Equestrian statue of Gattamelata, Piazza del Santo, Padua, erected.
- c.1455: Donatello's Mary Magdalene, for Florence Cathedral, now in Museo dell'Opera del Duomo (Florence).
- c.1457: Donatello's Judith and Holofernes erected outside Palazzo Medici Riccardi, Florence.

== Births ==
- 1450: Matteo Lappoli, Italian painter (died 1504)
- 1450 Hieronymus Bosch, Dutch painter (died 1516)
- 1450: Ludovico Brea – Italian painter active primarily in Genoa (died 1523)
- 1450: Guidoccio Cozzarelli - Italian Renaissance painter and miniaturist (died 1517)
- 1450: Bartolomeo Montagna – Italian painter and architect who worked in Vicenza and Venice (died 1523)
- 1450: Antonio del Massaro - Italian Quattrocento painters (died 1516)
- 1450: Francesco Raibolini known as Francesco Francia, Bolognese painter and medalist (died 1517)
- 1450: Pedro Berruguete – Spanish painter (died 1504)
- 1450: Bartholomäus Zeitblom – German painter and the chief master of the school of Ulm (died 1519)
- 1450: Matteo de Fedeli - Italian Renaissance painter (died 1505)
- 1450/1460: Jan Joest – Dutch painter (died 1519)
- 1450: Kamāl ud-Dīn Behzād – painter of Persian miniatures (died 1535)
- 1451: Cristoforo Moretti - painter of the quattrocento who worked in a late International Gothic style (died 1475)
- 1452: Pietro del Donzello – Italian painter (died 1509)
- 1452: Francesco dai Libri - Italian manuscript illuminator (died unknown)
- 1452: April 15 – Leonardo da Vinci, Italian Renaissance architect, anatomist, sculptor, engineer, inventor, geometer, scientist, mathematician, musician and painter (died 1519)
- 1452: February 14 – Davide Ghirlandaio, Italian painter and mosaicist (died 1525)
- 1452: Attavante degli Attavanti - Italian miniature painter (died 1525)
- 1453: Sultan Ali Mashhadi - Persian calligrapher and poet (died 1520)
- 1454: Pinturicchio – Italian painter of the Renaissance (died 1513)
- 1455: Ugo da Carpi – Italian painter and printmaker who worked in woodcut (died 1523)
- 1455: Giovanni Ambrogio de Predis – Italian Renaissance painter from Milan (died 1508)
- 1455: Adam Kraft – German sculptor and master builder of the late Gothic period (died 1509)
- 1455: Ippolito del Donzello - Italian Quattrocento painter (died unknown)
- 1455: Jörg Syrlin the Younger - German sculptor (died 1521)
- 1455: Peter Vischer the Elder – German sculptor (died 1529)
- 1455: Francesco Bonsignori – Italian painter (died 1519)
- 1455/1460: Bernardino Bergognone - Italian Renaissance painter of the Milanese school (died 1525)
- 1456: Bramantino (Bartolomeo Suardi) – Italian painter and architect (died 1530)
- 1457: Filippino Lippi, Tuscan painter (died 1504)
- 1457: Pietro di Domenico - Italian Renaissance painter (died 1506)
- 1457/1459: Jean Bourdichon, French miniature painter and manuscript illuminator (died 1521)
- 1458: Pietro di Francesco degli Orioli – sculptor (died 1496)
- 1458: Antonio Lombardo – Italian sculptor (died 1516)
- 1459: Lorenzo di Credi – Italian painter and sculptor (died 1537)
- 1459: Cima da Conegliano – Italian Renaissance painter (died 1517)
- 1459: Wu Wei – Chinese landscape painter during the Ming Dynasty (died 1508)
- 1459/1460: Benedetto Buglioni – Italian sculptor in glazed terracotta (died 1521)

== Deaths ==
- 1459: Jacques Morel - French sculptor (born 1395)
- 1457: Andrea del Castagno - Italian fresco painter from Florence (born 1421)
- 1457: Rossello di Jacopo Franchi – Italian painter (born 1376)
- February 18, 1455 – Fra Angelico – Italian painter (born 1395)
- December 1, 1455 – Lorenzo Ghiberti – Italian artist of the early Renaissance best known for works in sculpture and metalworking (born 1378)
- 1455: Pisanello – painter of the early Italian Renaissance and Quattrocento (born 1395)
- 1453: Parri Spinelli – Italian (Tuscan) painter of the early renaissance (born 1387)
- 1452: Bicci di Lorenzo – Italian painter and sculptor, active in Florence (born 1373)
- 1452: Bernardo Martorell – Spanish painter, working in an Early Renaissance style (born 1400)
- 1451: Piero di Niccolo Lamberti – Italian sculptor (born 1393)
- 1450: Sassetta – Italian painter (born 1392)
- 1450: Xie Huan – Chinese painter of the early Ming Dynasty (died 1370)
