= 1596 in art =

| List of years in art | (table) |
- … 1586; 1587; 1588; 1589; 1590; 1591; 1592; 1593; 1594; 1595; 1596; 1597; 1598; 1599; 1600; 1601; 1602; 1603; 1604; 1605; 1606 …
- Art; Archaeology; Architecture; Literature; Music; Philosophy; Science; +...

Events from the year 1596 in art.

== Events ==
- (unknown)

== Paintings ==
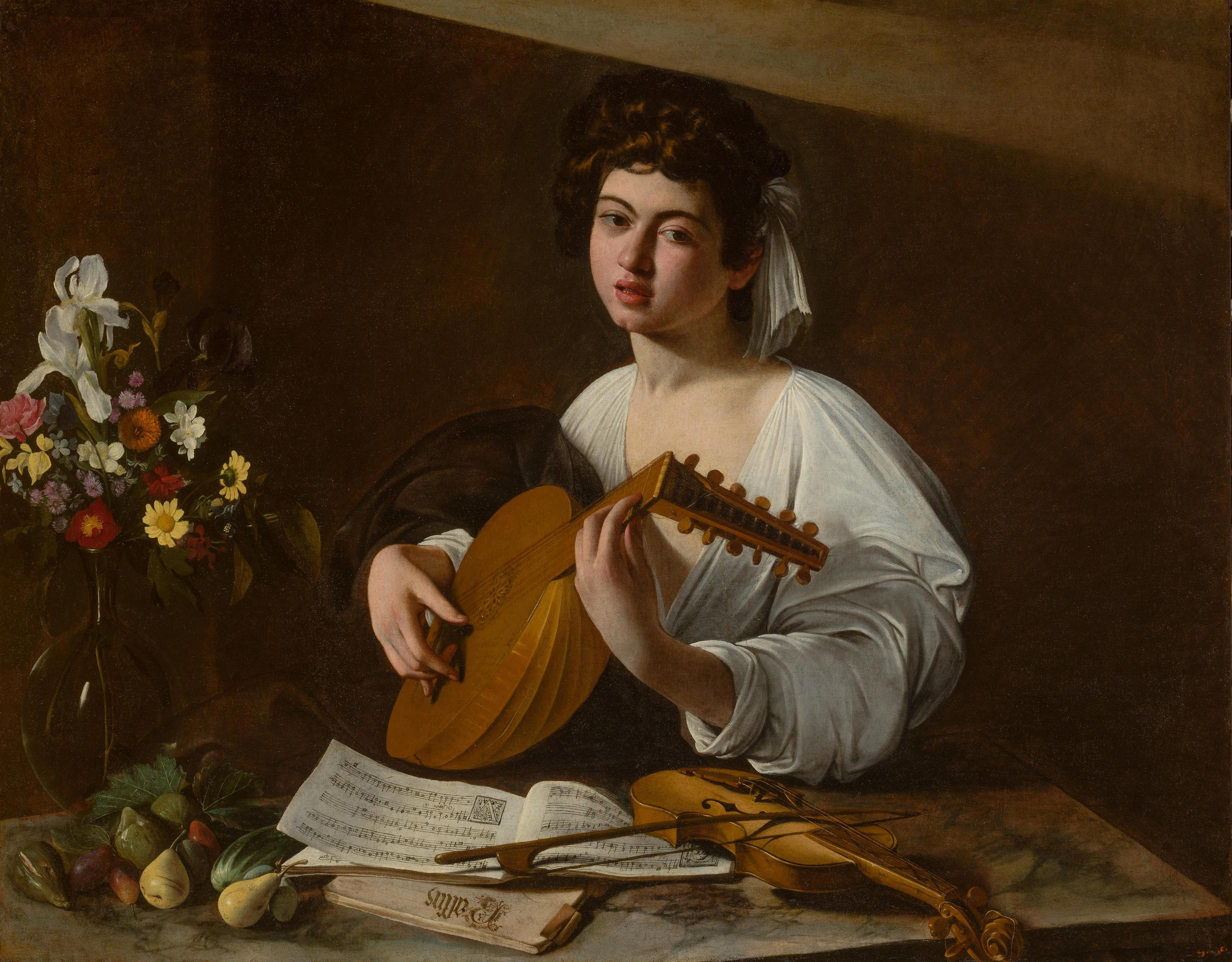
Caravaggio, The Lute Player

- Federico Barocci - Annunciation (Basilica of Santa Maria degli Angeli, Assisi)
- Caravaggio
  - The Lute Player
  - Medusa (first version)
- Annibale Carracci - The Choice of Hercules

== Births ==
- January 13 - Jan van Goyen, Dutch landscape painter (died 1656)
- February 2 - Jacob van Campen, Dutch artist and architect of the Golden Age (died 1657)
- April - Juan van der Hamen, Spanish still life painter (died 1631)
- May - Abraham van Diepenbeeck, Dutch painter of the Flemish School (died 1675)
- June 5 - Peter Wtewael, Dutch painter, son of Joachim Wtewael (died 1660)
- October 1 - Cesare Dandini, Italian painter (died 1657)
- October 5 - Pieter van Mierevelt, Dutch Golden Age painter (died 1623)
- November 1 – Pietro da Cortona, pseudonym of Pietro Berettini, prolific artist and architect of High Baroque (died 1669)
- December 24 - Leonaert Bramer, Dutch painter (died 1674)
- date unknown
  - Antonio Bisquert, Spanish painter of the Baroque period (died 1646)
  - Obaku Dokuryu, Japanese calligrapher and painter (died 1672)
  - Andrea di Leone, Italian painter of battle scenes (died 1675)
  - Xiao Yuncong, Chinese landscape painter, calligrapher, and poet in the late Ming Dynasty (died 1673)
- probable
  - Thomas de Keyser, Dutch painter and architect (died 1667)
  - Antonio Catalani, Italian painter of the late-Renaissance and early-Baroque periods (d. unknown)

== Deaths ==
- July 10 - Alessandro Alberti, Italian painter (born 1551)
- date unknown
  - Hans Donauer, German painter (b. c.1521)
  - George Gower, English portrait painter who became sergeant-painter to Queen Elizabeth I (born 1540)
  - Nicholas Francken of Herenthals, Flemish painter (b. unknown)
  - Dario Varotari the Elder, Italian painter, sculptor, and architect (b. c.1539)
  - Pedro de Villegas Marmolejo, Spanish sculptor and painter (born 1519)
- probable
  - Niccolò Circignani, Italian painter of the late-Renaissance or Mannerist period (born 1517/1524)
  - Pellegrino Tibaldi, Italian mannerist architect, sculptor, and mural painter (born 1527)
