= 1517 in art =

Events from the year 1517 in art.

== Events ==
- Hans Baldung leaves Freiburg and returns to Strasbourg.
- Sebastiano del Piombo begins painting The Raising of Lazarus (circa 1517).
- Perugino completes the altarpiece for the San Agostino Church.
- Pontormo begins work on Joseph in Egypt (completed in 1518).
- Raphael begins decorating the Logge Vaticane (completed in 1519).
- Domenico Fancelli completes sculpting the tomb of the Catholic Monarchs in the Royal Chapel of Granada.

== Works ==
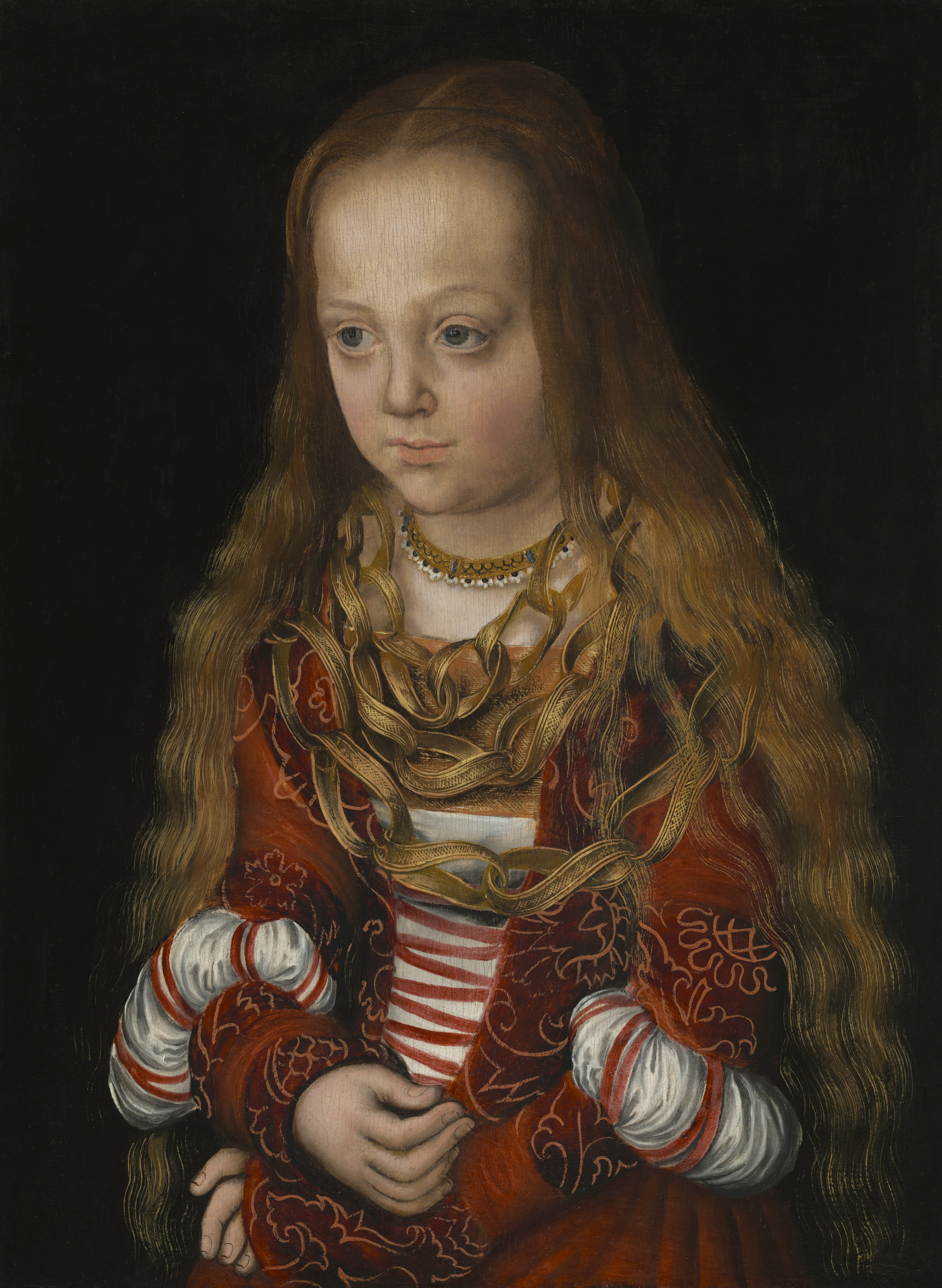
Lucas Cranach the Elder – Portrait of a Saxon Princess

- Andrea del Sarto – Madonna of the Harpies
- Hans Baldung – Death and the Maiden
- Lucas Cranach the Elder – Portrait of a Saxon Princess
- Niklaus Manuel Deutsch – Death and the Maiden
- Lorenzo Lotto – Susanna and the Elders
- Quentin Matsys – Portrait of Desiderius Erasmus
- Pontormo – St. Quentin
- Raphael
  - Christ Falling on the Way to Calvary (Lo Spasimo; approximate date)
  - The Path of Suffering
- Raphael's workshop
  - frescos for "Raphael Rooms" in the Apostolic Palace of the Vatican
  - The Coronation of Charlemagne (probably executed by Gianfrancesco Penni)
  - The Oath of Leo III

== Births ==
- September 6 - Francisco de Holanda, Portuguese humanist and painter (born c. 1517, died 1585)
- December 15 - Giacomo Gaggini, Italian sculptor (died 1598)
- date unknown
  - Frans Floris, Flemish painter and one of a large family trained to the study of art in Flanders (born c. 1517, died 1570)
  - Willem Mahue, Flemish painter (died 1569)
- approximate date - Antonis Mor, Dutch portrait painter (died 1577)
- 1517/1524: Niccolò Circignani, Italian painter of the late-Renaissance or Mannerist period (died 1596)

== Deaths ==
- January 5 – Francesco Raibolini known as Francesco Francia, Bolognese painter and medalist (born 1450)
- October 31 – Fra Bartolommeo, Florentine painter (born 1472)
- date unknown
  - Nikola Božidarević, Croatian painter (born 1460)
  - Cima da Conegliano, Italian Renaissance painter (born 1459 or 1460, died 1517 or 1518)
  - Guidoccio Cozzarelli - Italian Renaissance painter and miniaturist (born 1450)
