= 1638 in art =

This is a list of events that occurred in the year 1638 in art.

== Events ==
- Anthony van Dyck is granted denizenship by Charles I of England and marries Mary, daughter of Lord Ruthven; his assistant Adriaen Hanneman returns to his native Hague to become the leading portraitist there.
- Francisco Zurbarán begins work on the series of paintings in the Santa María de Guadalupe

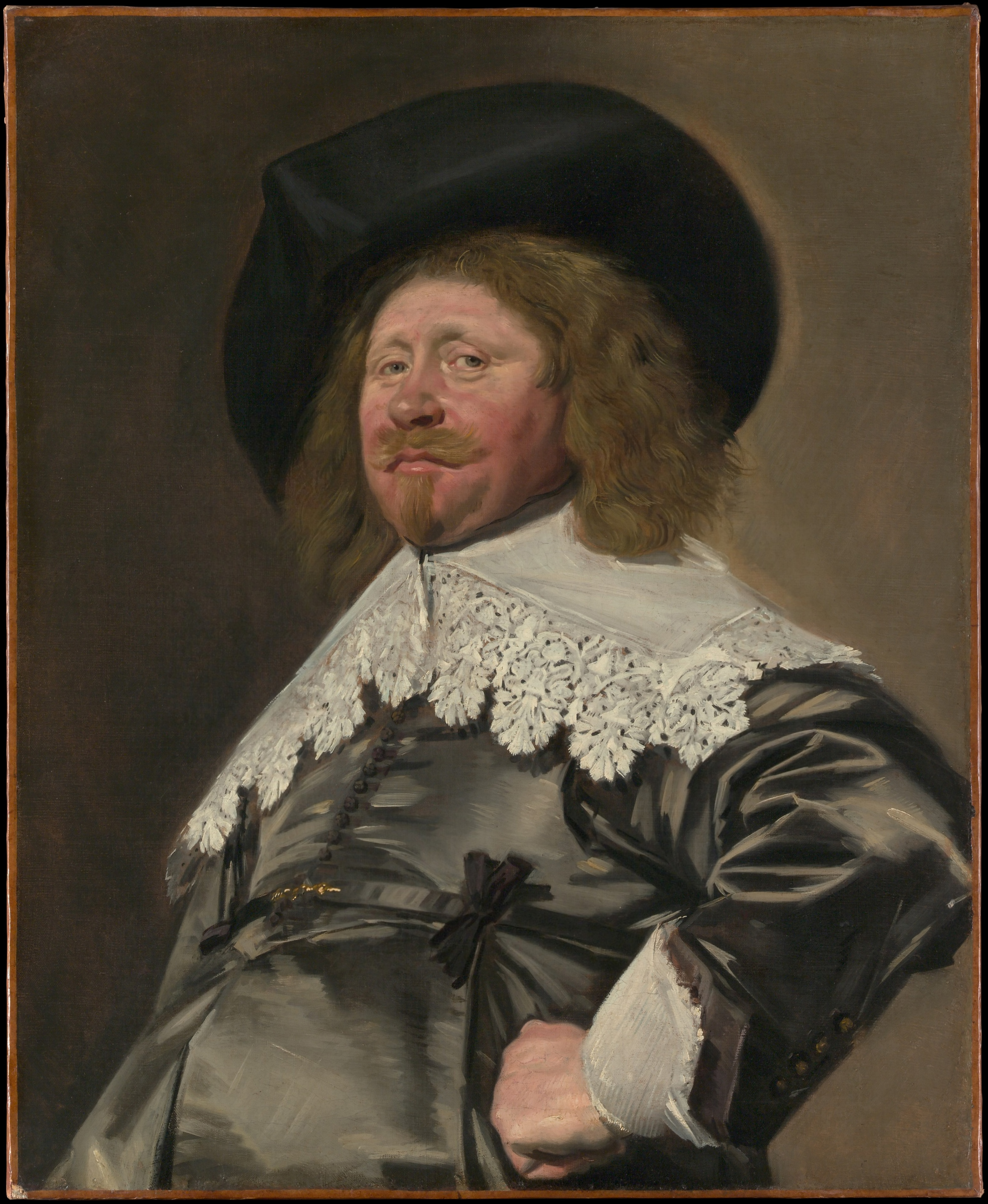
Frans Hals – Claes Duyst van Voorhout

== Works ==
- Gian Lorenzo Bernini – Bust of Thomas Baker
- Frans Hals – Claes Duyst van Voorhout
- Hubert Le Sueur – Equestrian statue of Charles I, Charing Cross (London)
- Nicolas Poussin – Et in Arcadia ego (Les bergers d'Arcadie, Louvre)
- Rembrandt
  - Landscape with the Good Samaritan
  - Stormy Landscape
- Peter Paul Rubens
  - The Massacre of the Innocents (second version – approximate date)
  - The Judgement of Paris (second version – approximate date)
- Justus Sustermans – Portrait of Galileo Galilei
- Anthony van Dyck – some dates approximate
  - Equestrian Portrait of Charles I
  - George Digby
  - Thomas Killigrew
  - Thomas Killigrew and Lord Crofts
  - Lord John Stuart and his brother Lord Bernard Stuart
  - Triple Portrait of Henrietta Maria

== Births ==
- January 8 - Elisabetta Sirani, Italian painter (died 1665)
- May 12 - Pedro Atanasio Bocanegra, Spanish painter (died 1688)
- June 6 (bapt.) - Gerrit Adriaenszoon Berckheyde, Dutch artist (died 1698)
- July 10 – David Teniers III, Flemish painter (died 1685)
- August 22 - Georg Christoph Eimmart, German draughtsman and engraver (died 1705)
- September 20 - Antonio Gherardi, painter, sculptor and architect (died 1702)
- October 31 (bapt.) – Meindert Hobbema, Dutch landscape painter (died 1709)
- date unknown
  - Antonio Franchi, Italian painter active mainly in Florence and Lucca (died 1709)
  - Luigi Garzi, Italian painter of the Baroque period (died 1721)
  - Crisóstomo Martinez, Valencian painter and engraver known for his anatomical atlas (died 1694)
  - Mo'en Mosavver, Persian miniaturist during the Safavid period (died 1697)
  - Jan Karel Donatus van Beecq, Dutch painter (died 1722)

== Deaths ==
- January - Adriaen Brouwer, Flemish genre painter (born 1605)
- March 6 - Paulus Moreelse, Dutch painter, mainly of portraits (born 1571)
- March 10 - Cornelis van der Geest, Flemish merchant and art collector (born 1577)
- April 14 - Willem Jacobsz Delff, Dutch painter (born 1580)
- August 1 - Joachim Wtewael, Dutch painter and engraver (born 1566)
- August 18 - Giovanni Andrea Ansaldo, Italian painter active mainly in Genoa (born 1584)
- October - Gillis d'Hondecoeter, Dutch painter in a Flemish style (born 1575/1580)
- November 11 - Cornelis van Haarlem, Dutch painter and draughtsman, leading Mannerist artist (born 1562)
- December 23 - Barbara Longhi, Italian painter (born 1552)
- date unknown
  - Pietro Francesco Alberti, Italian painter and engraver (born 1584)
  - Baldassare Aloisi, Italian portrait painter and engraver (born 1578)
  - Vincenzo Carducci, Italian painter (born 1568)
  - Santo Peranda, historical painter of Venice (born 1566)
  - Giovanni Giacomo Semenza, Italian painter (born 1580)
  - Magdalena van de Passe, engraver and important member of the Van de Passe family of artists (born 1600)
  - Jacob van Swanenburgh, Dutch history painter and teacher (born 1571)
- probable
  - Odoardo Fialetti, Italian painter and printmaker (born 1573)
  - Hercules Seghers, Dutch painter and printmaker of the Dutch Golden Age (born 1589)
