= 1570 in art =

List of years in art	(table)
- … 1560; 1561; 1562; 1563; 1564; 1565; 1566; 1567; 1568; 1569; 1570; 1571; 1572; 1573; 1574; 1575; 1576; 1577; 1578; 1579; 1580 …
- Art; Archaeology; Architecture; Literature; Music; Philosophy; Science; +...

Events from the year 1570 in art.

== Events ==
- Ustad ‘Osman becomes head of the painters at the Seraglio workshop of Sultan Murad III.

== Works ==
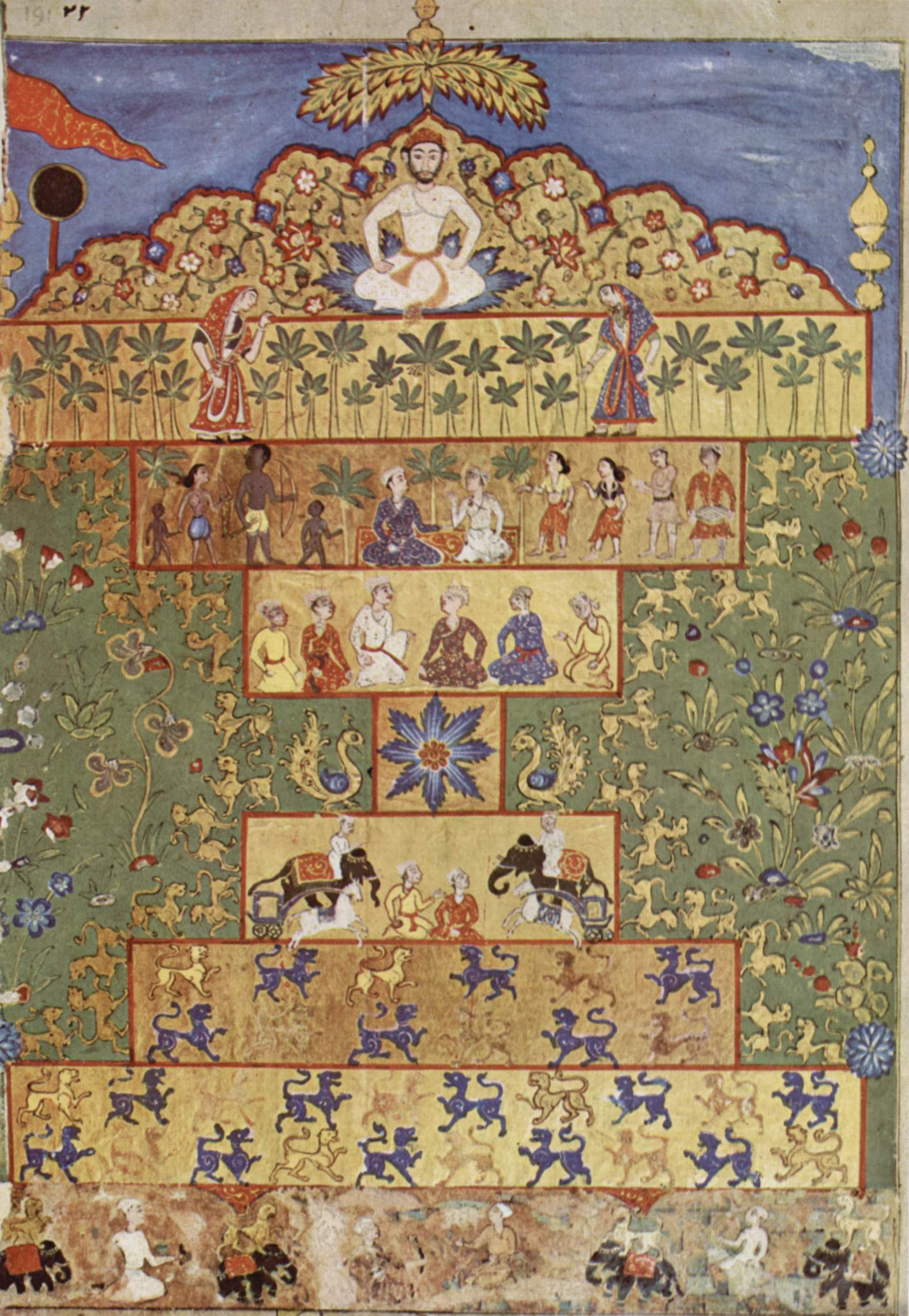
Adil Shahi court painters, a page from the Nujum-ul-Ulum (Stars of Science) manuscript – The Throne of the Wealth, Chester Beatty Library

- Federico Barocci - Rest on the Flight into Egypt (Vatican Museums)
- Joachim Beuckelaer - The Four Elements (series completed)
- Bernaert de Rijckere - The Festival of the Gods
- Hans Eworth- Elizabeth 1st
- El Greco - The Entombment of Christ (approximate completion date)
- Paolo Veronese - The Allegory of Love (ceiling paintings for Prague Castle; now in National Gallery, London)

== Births ==
- November 15 - Francesco Curradi, Italian painter of the style described as Counter-Maniera or Counter-Mannerism (died 1631)
- date unknown
  - Giuseppe Agellio, Italian painter (died after 1620)
  - Giulio Cesare Angeli, Italian painter (died 1630)
  - Cornelis Jacobsz Delff, Dutch painter (died 1643)
  - Tommaso Dolabella, Baroque painter from Venice (died 1650)
  - Renold Elstracke, one of the earliest native engravers in England (died 1625)
  - Epiphanius Evesham, British sculptor (died 1634)
  - Aegidius Sadeler II, Flemish engraver of the Sadeler family (died 1629)
  - Gillis van Valckenborch, Flemish painter (died 1622)
  - Francesco Zucco, Italian painter (died 1627)
- probable
  - Abel Grimmer, Flemish painter (died c.1620)
  - Hans Krumpper, sculptor and plasterer (died 1634)
  - Pasquale Ottini, Italian painter active mainly in Verona (died 1630)
  - Isabella Parasole, Italian engraver on wood (date of death unknown)
  - Leonardo Parasole, Italian engraver on wood (date of death unknown)
  - Aegidius Sadeler, Flemish painter and engraver (died 1629)
  - Denis van Alsloot, Flemish painter (died 1626)
  - 1570-1575:Simon Frisius, Dutch engraver (died 1628/29)

== Deaths ==
- January 19 - Paris Bordone, Venetian painter (born 1495)
- October 1 – Frans Floris, Flemish painter (born 1519)
- October 3 - Hieronymus Cock, Flemish Northern Renaissance painter, etcher and publisher of prints (born 1510)
- November 27 - Jacopo Sansovino, Italian sculptor and architect, especially around the Piazza San Marco in Venice (born 1486)
- date unknown
  - Gaspar Becerra, Spanish painter and sculptor (born 1520)
  - Francesco Imparato, Italian painter active mainly in his natal city of Naples (born 1520)
  - Ferdinando Manlio, Italian sculptor (date of birth unknown)
  - Francesco Melzi, Italian painter, beloved and favourite pupil of Leonardo da Vinci (born 1491)
  - Francesco Primaticcio, Italian painter, architect, and sculptor (born 1504)
  - Martin Van Cleve, Flemish painter (born 1520)
- probable - Domenico del Barbieri, Florentine artist of the Renaissance period (born 1506)
