= 1508 in art =

Events from the year 1508 in art.

== Events ==
- December - Michelangelo begins painting the Sistine Chapel ceiling in the Holy See of Rome on a commission by Pope Julius II (signed May 10). This year also he completes a bronze statue of the Pope for San Petronio Basilica in Bologna, destroyed in 1511.

== Works ==
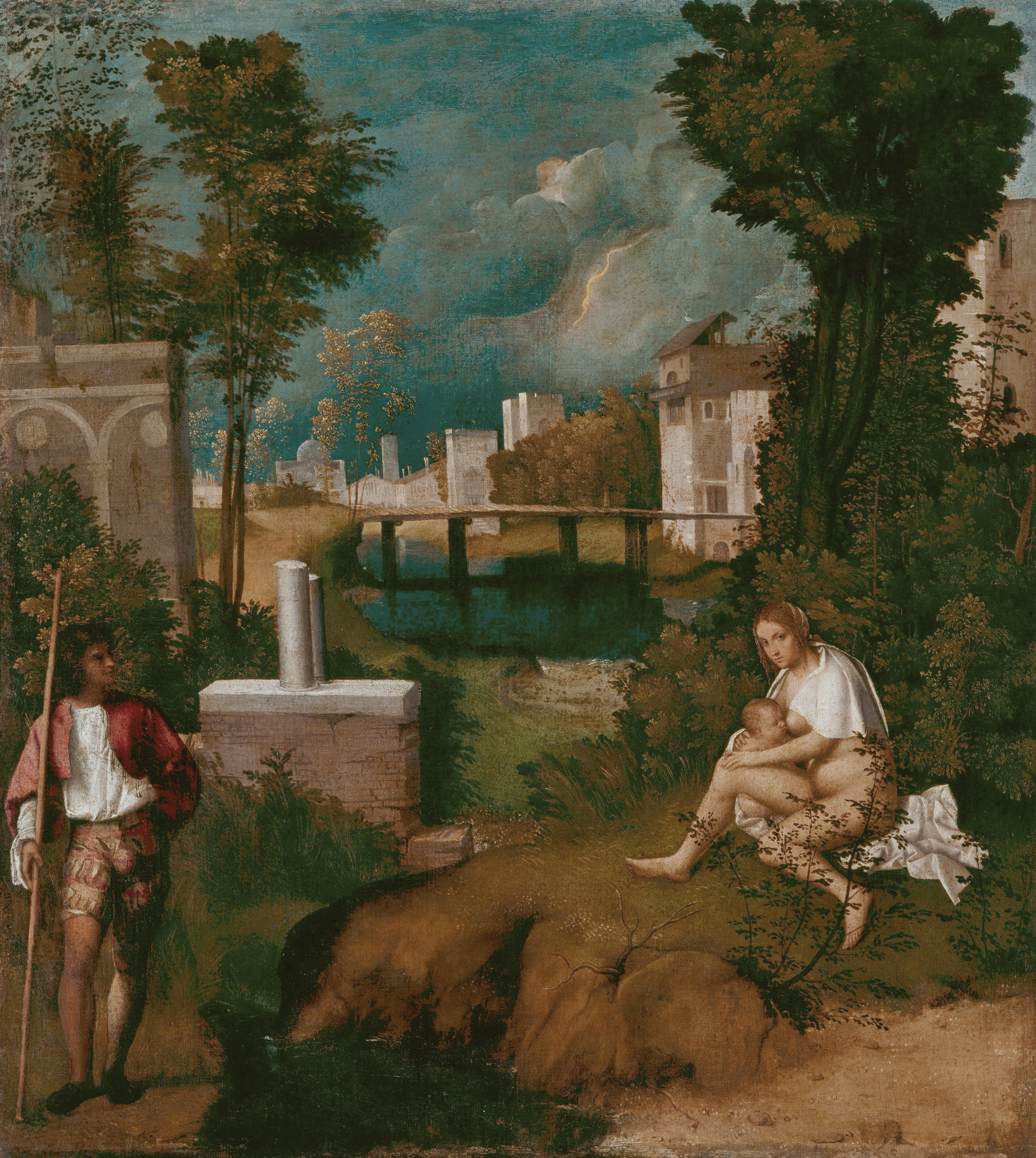
Giorgione, The Tempest

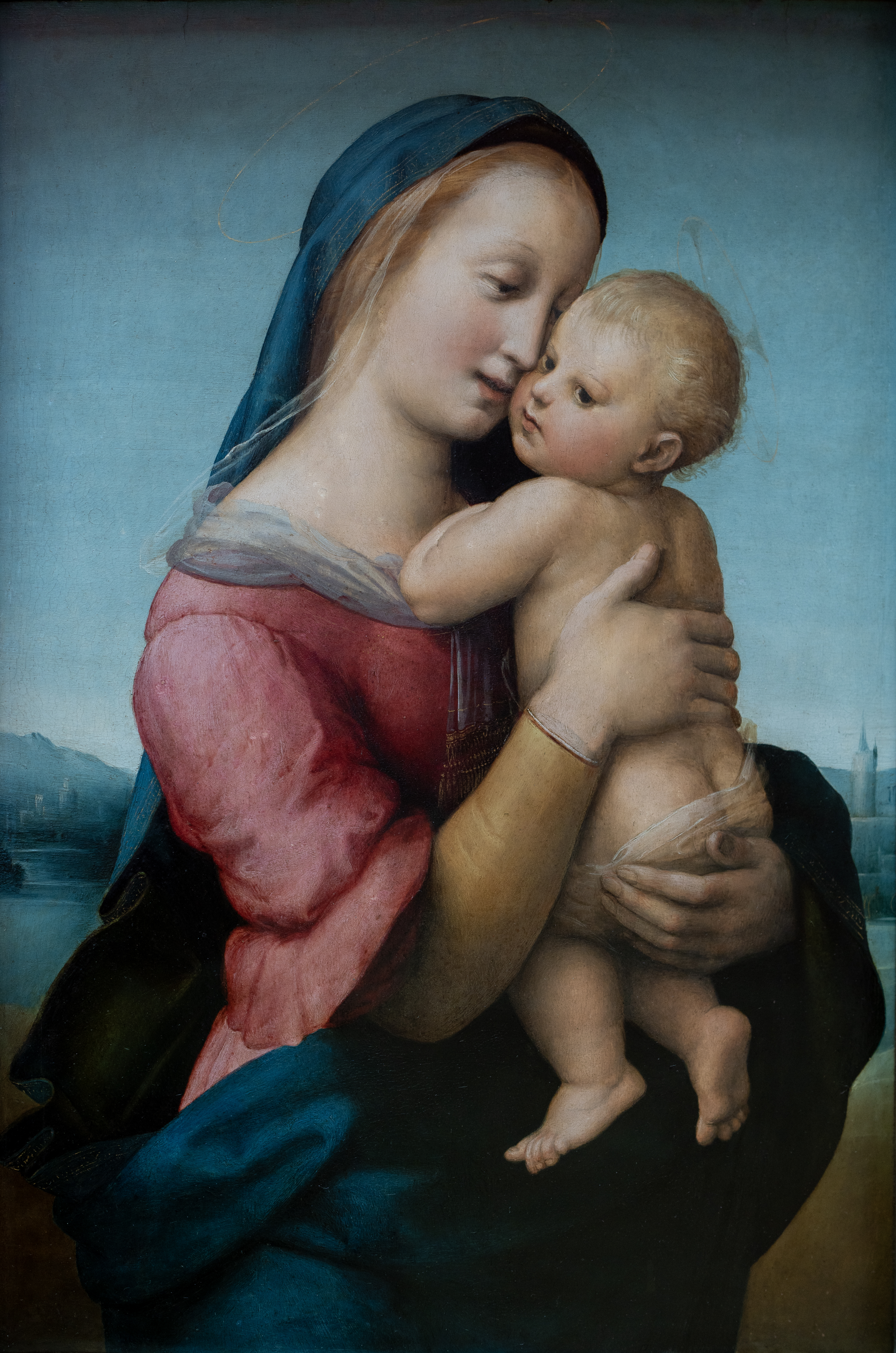
Raphael, The Tempi Madonna
- Fra Bartolomeo - Holy Father, St. Mary Magdalene and St. Catherine of Siena
- Vittore Carpaccio - The Presentation of the Virgin (approximate date)
- Albrecht Dürer
  - Heller Altarpiece (possible date)
  - Martyrdom of the Ten Thousand
- Giorgione (approximate dates)
  - Shepherd with a Flute
  - The Tempest
  - La Vecchia (Old Woman)
- Lorenzo Lotto
  - Madonna with Child between Sts. Flavian and Onuphrius
  - Recanati Polyptych
- Raphael
  - Colonna Madonna
  - Niccolini-Cowper Madonna
  - The Tempi Madonna
- Lucas van Leyden – Mohammed and the Murdered Monk (engraving)

== Births ==
- November 25 - Cristofano Gherardi, Italian Mannerist painter (died 1556)
- date unknown
  - Livio Agresti, Italian painter, one of the members of the "Forlì painting school" (died 1580)
  - Pieter Aertsen, Dutch historical painter (died 1575)
  - Antonio da Trento, Italian artist especially of woodcuts (died 1550)
  - Girolamo da Treviso, Italian painter (died 1544)
  - Giovanni Bernardo Lama, Italian painter (died 1579)
  - Qian Gu, Chinese landscape painter during the Ming Dynasty (died c.1578)
  - 1508/1510: Lodovico Dolce, Italian art theorist (died 1568)
  - 1507/1508: Wenzel Jamnitzer, Northern Mannerist goldsmith, artist, and printmaker in etching (died 1585)

== Deaths ==
- Giovanni Ambrogio de Predis, Italian Renaissance painter from Milan (born 1455)
- Wu Wei, Chinese landscape painter during the Ming Dynasty (born 1459)
- 1508/1509: Bernt Notke, German painter and sculptor (born 1435)
