= 1509 in art =

Events from the year 1509 in art.

== Events ==
- June 11 – Luca Pacioli's De divina proportione, concerning the golden ratio, is published in Venice, with illustrations by Leonardo da Vinci.

== Works ==
=== Painting ===
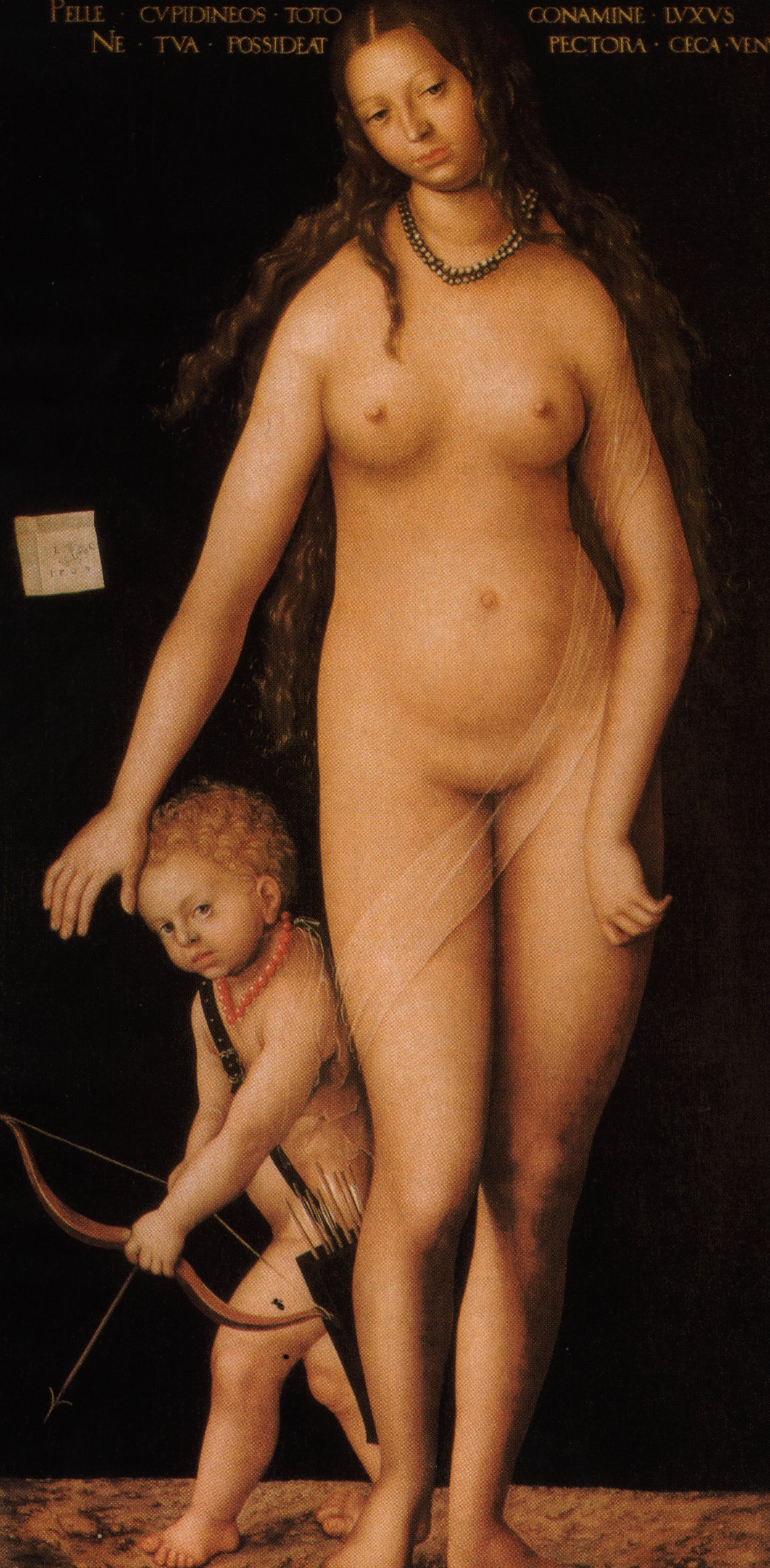
Cranach – Venus and Cupid

- Fra Bartolomeo
  - Madonna and Child with Saints (altarpiece, Lucca Cathedral)
  - The Rest on the Flight into Egypt, with St. John the Baptist (Getty Museum)
- Lucas Cranach the Elder – Venus and Cupid
- Gerard David – The Virgin among the Virgins
- Raphael
  - Portrait of Tommaso Inghirami
  - Stanza della Segnatura (fresco, Apostolic Palace, Vatican)
- Titian (previously attributed to Giorgione) – Pastoral Concert (approximate date)

== Births ==
- (born 1509/1512): Niccolo dell'Abbate, Italian Mannerist painter and decorator, of the Emilian school (died 1571)
- Daniele da Volterra, Italian mannerist painter and sculptor (died 1566)
- Leone Leoni, Italian sculptor and medallist (died 1590)
- Danese Cattaneo, Italian sculptor (died 1572)

== Deaths ==
- Pietro del Donzello, Italian painter (born 1452)
- Adam Kraft, German sculptor and master builder of the late Gothic period (born 1455)
- Hans Seyffer, German stone sculptor and wood carver of the late Gothic style (born 1460)
- Shen Zhou, Ming dynasty master in painting, poetry, and calligraphy (born 1427)
- 1509/1517: Benvenuto di Giovanni, Italian artist, manuscripts (born 1436)
