= 1504 in art =

Events from the year 1504 in art.

== Events ==
- January 25 – A committee of artists and citizens of Florence, including Leonardo da Vinci, Sandro Botticelli, Cosimo Rosselli and Piero di Cosimo, meets to decide on the placement of Michelangelo's marble statue of David.
- September 8 – Michelangelo's David is unveiled in Florence.
- The Signoria of Florence commissions both Michelangelo and Leonardo da Vinci to paint the walls of the Grand Council Chamber in the Palazzo della Signoria.

== Works ==
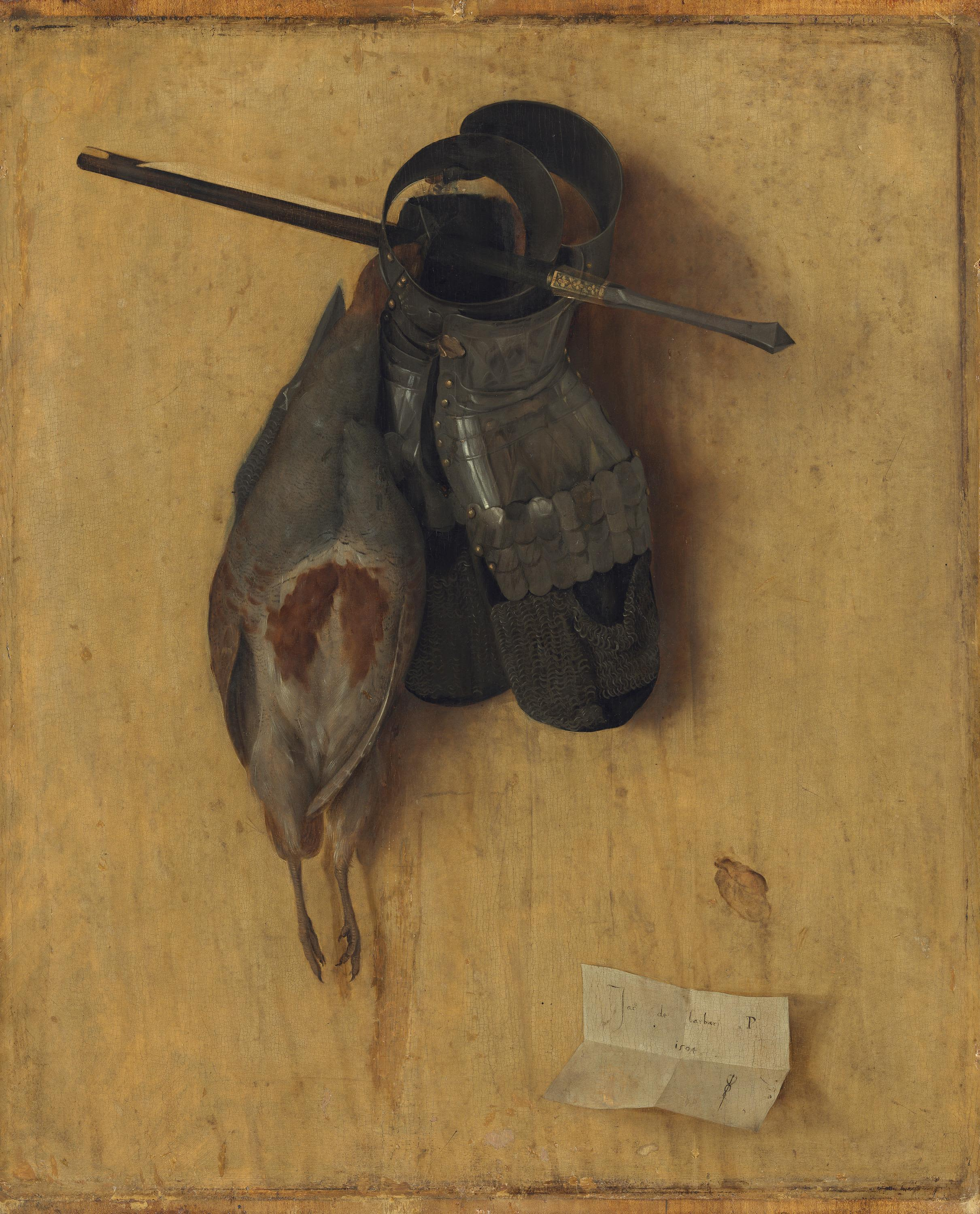
Barbari, trompe-l'œil, Still life with Partridge and Gauntlets

Bosch, The Garden of Earthly Delights

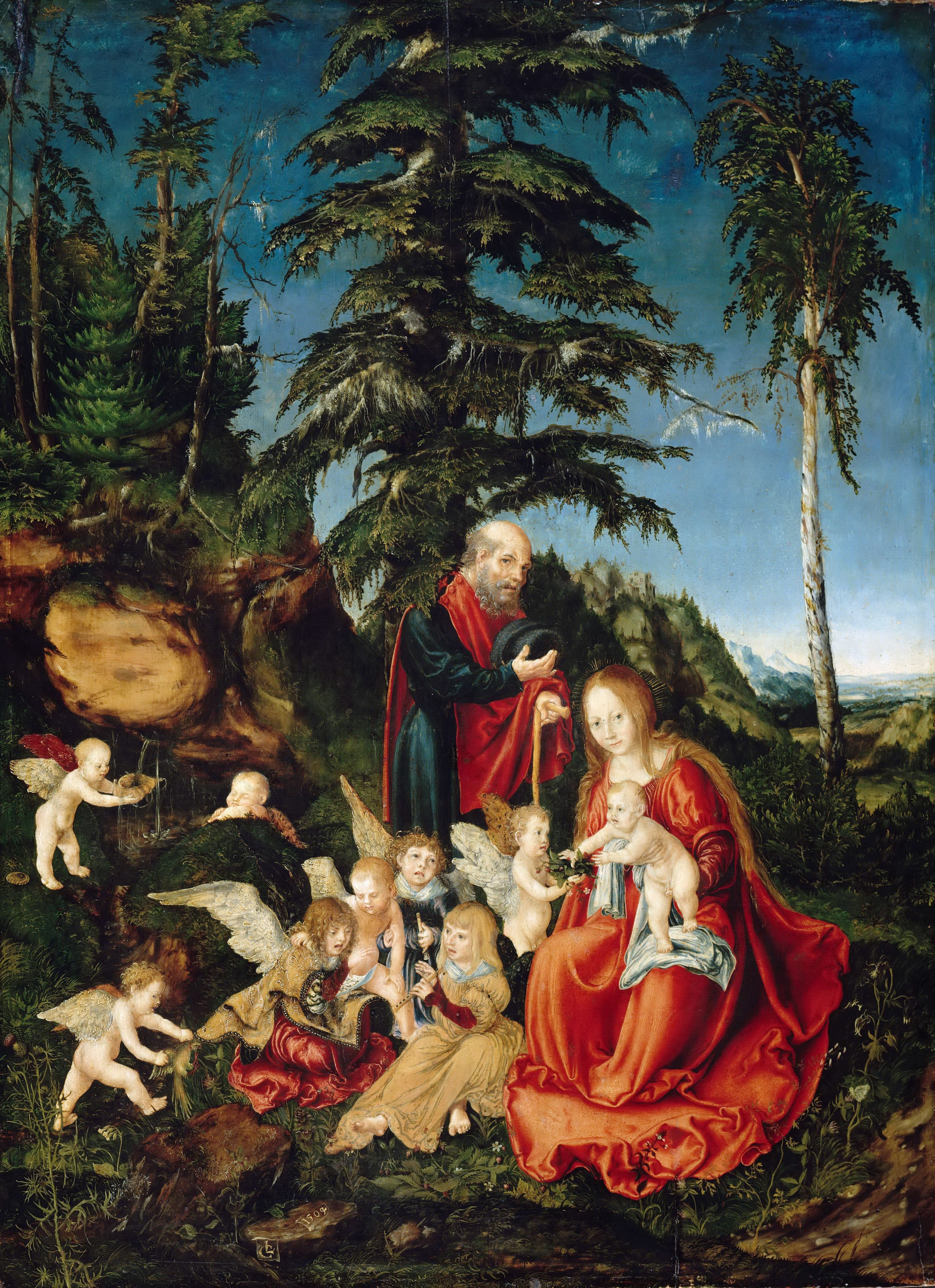
Cranach, The Rest on the Flight to Egypt

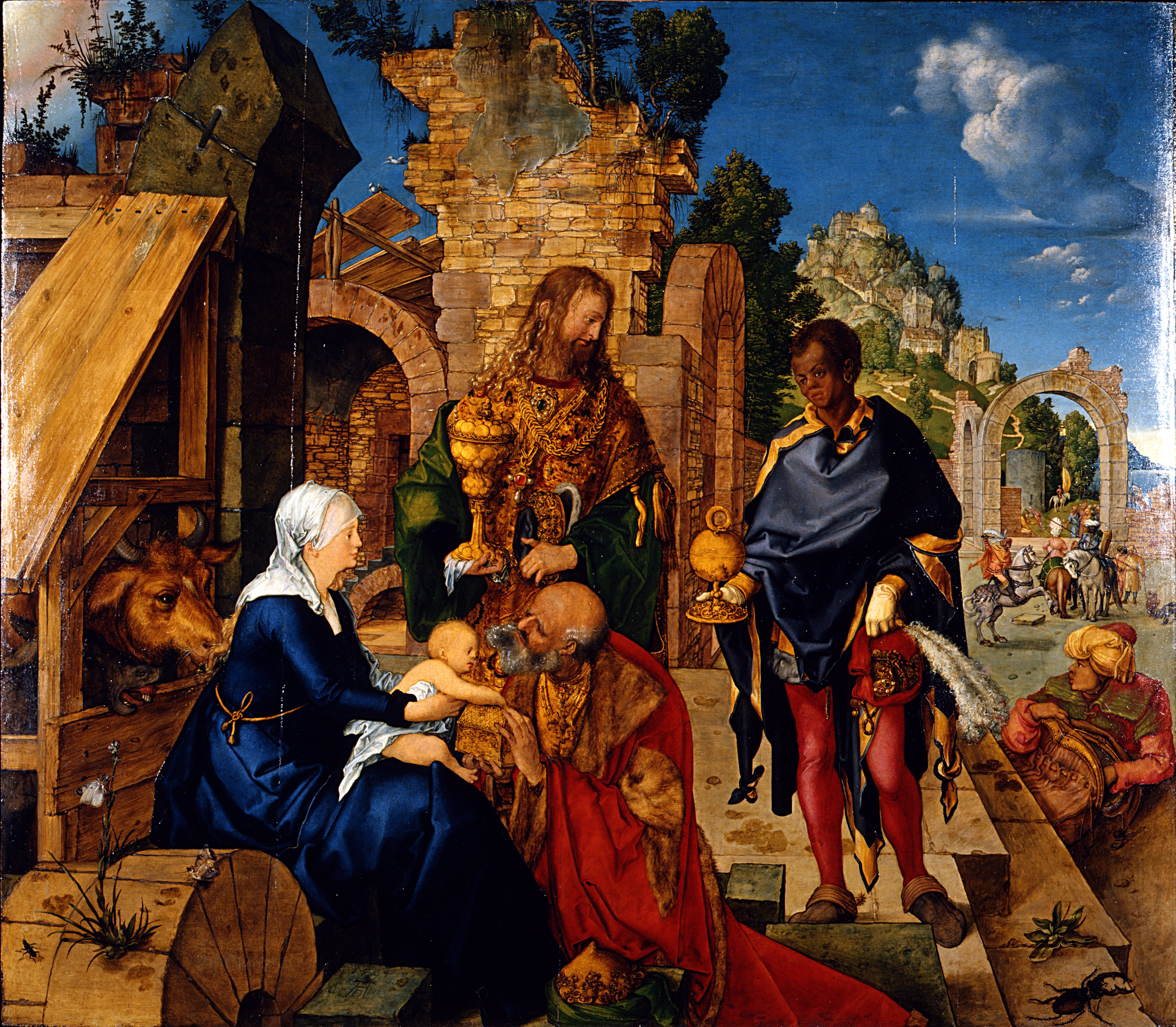
Dürer, Adoration of the Magi

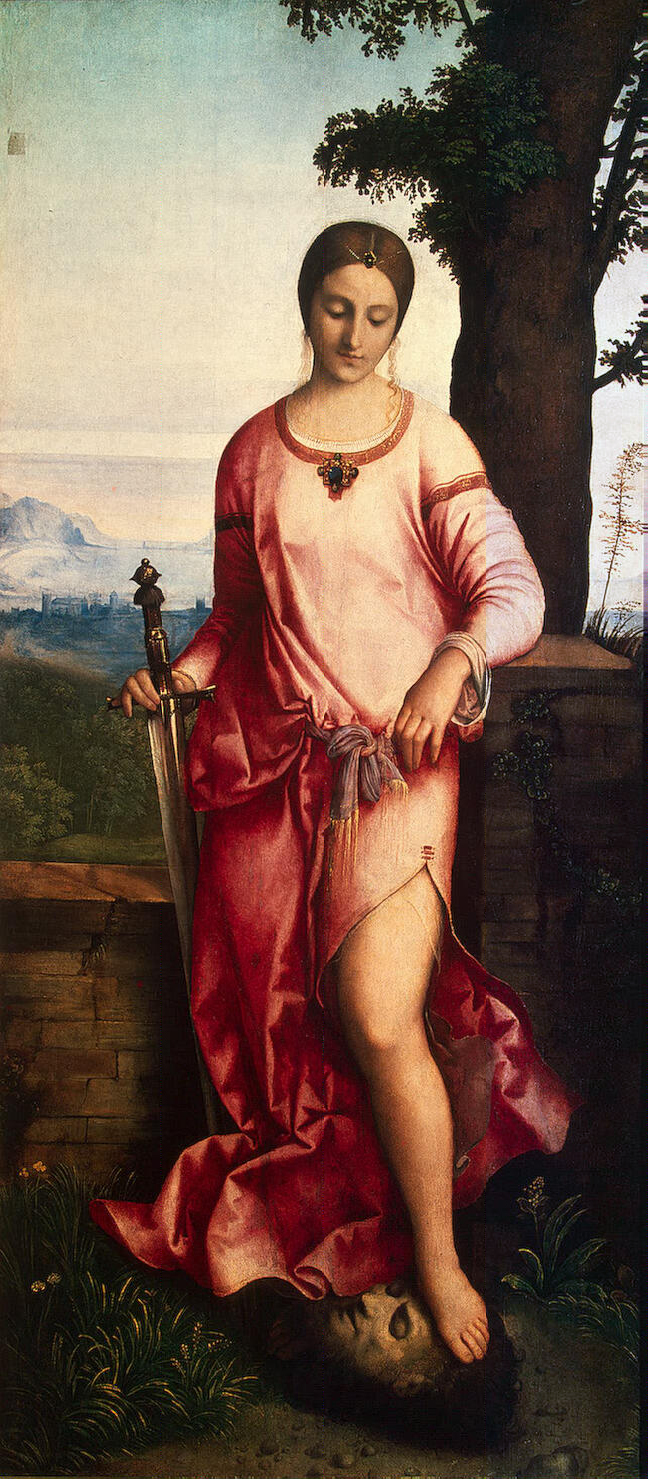
Giorgione, Judith

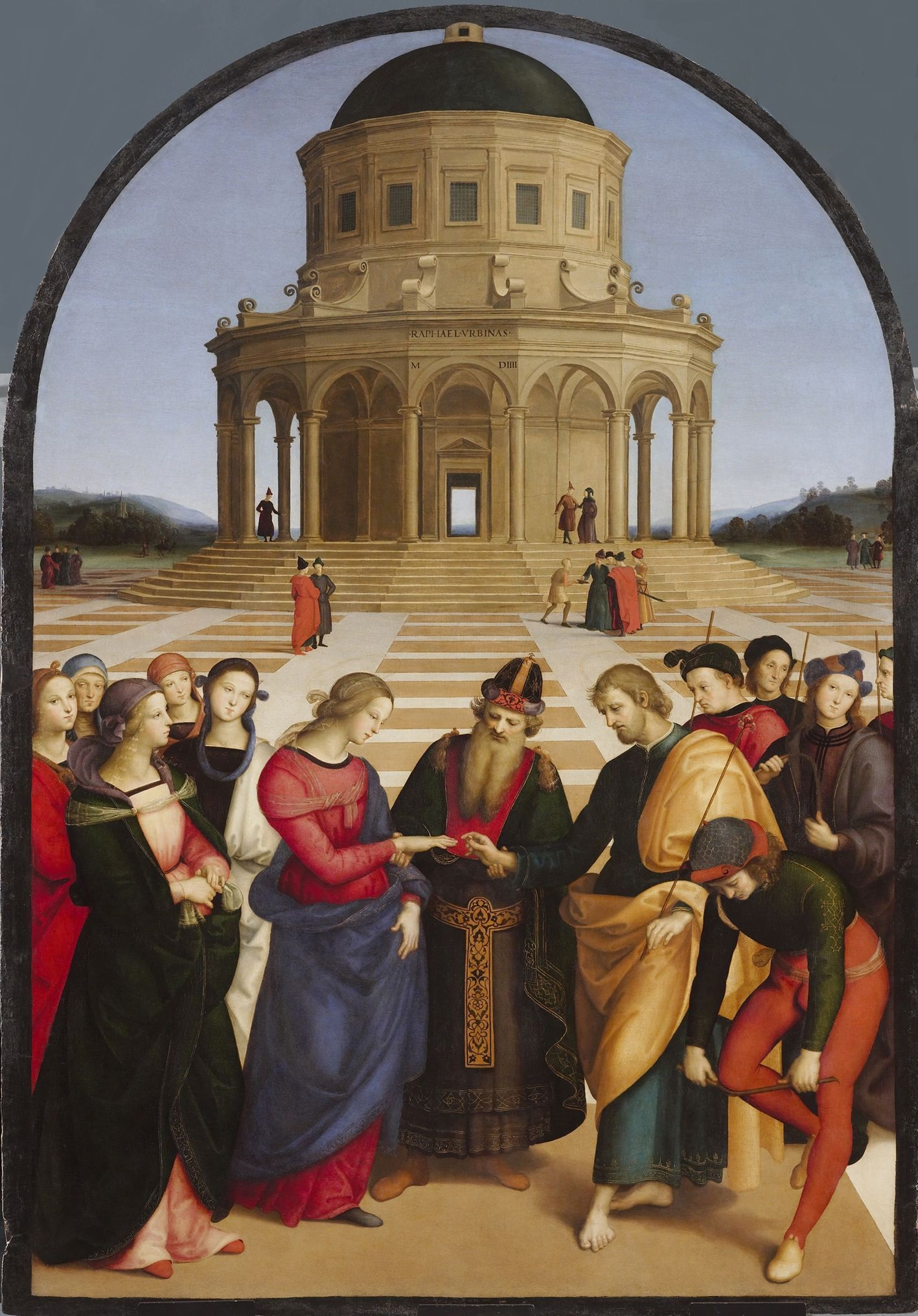
Raphael, Marriage of the Virgin

=== Sculpture ===
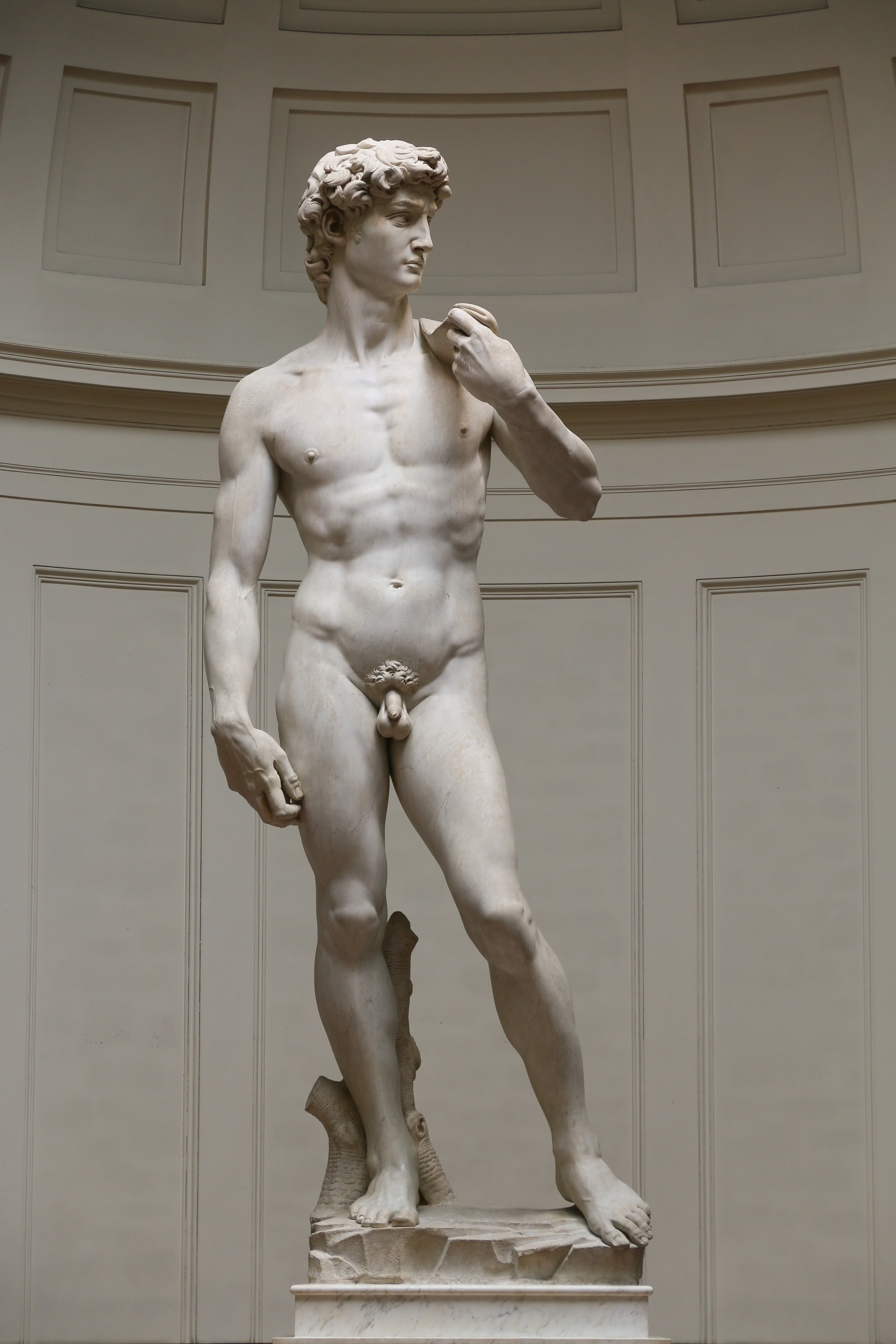
Michelangelo's David

- Michelangelo
  - David
  - Madonna of Bruges
  - Pitti Tondo (marble bas-relief)
  - Taddei Tondo

=== Graphic art ===
- Jacopo de' Barbari – Still life with Partridge and Gauntlets
- Fra Bartolomeo – The Vision of St. Bernard with Sts. Benedict and John the Evangelist (approximate date)
- Hieronymus Bosch – The Garden of Earthly Delights (triptych; approximate date)
- Cima da Conegliano (approximate date)
  - Christ among the doctors
  - Madonna and Child (Uffizi and San Francisco versions)
  - Saints Peter Martyr, Nicholas of Bari, Benedict and an Angel Musician
- Lucas Cranach the Elder – The Rest on the Flight to Egypt
- Albrecht Dürer
  - Adoration of the Magi
  - Joachim and Anne Meeting at the Golden Gate (woodcut)
- Giorgione (approximate date)
  - Castelfranco Madonna
  - Judith
- Leonardo da Vinci – The Battle of Anghiari
- Pietro Perugino – Marriage of the Virgin
- Raphael
  - Portrait of Pietro Bembo
  - Marriage of the Virgin
  - Saint George
  - Vision of a Knight
- The Seven Works of Mercy (Master of Alkmaar)

== Publications ==
- Pomponius Gauricus – De sculptura

== Births ==
- April 30 – Francesco Primaticcio, Bolognese painter, architect and sculptor (died 1570)
- October 29 – Shin Saimdang, Korean genre works painter and calligraphist (died 1551)
- date unknown – Sesson Shukei, Japanese Zen monk and painter from the Muromachi period (died 1589)
- probable – Marco d'Agrate, Italian sculptor (died 1574)

== Deaths ==
- April 15 – Filippino Lippi, Tuscan painter (born 1457)
- date unknown
  - Pedro Berruguete, Spanish painter (born 1450)
  - Gian Giacomo Dolcebuono, Italian architect and sculptor (born 1445)
  - Matteo Lappoli, Italian painter (born 1450)
  - Master I. A. M. of Zwolle, anonymous Dutch goldsmith and engraver (born 1440)
