= Gasparo Sacchi =

Italian painter

Gasparo Sacchi, also known as Gaspare da Imola, ( active c. 1517–1536) was an Italian painter of the Renaissance period.

== Biography ==
Born in Imola, he painted in Ravenna and other towns of the Romagna. He painted in a San Pietro de Imola altarpiece in 1517 and a Virgin with Saints Rocco, Francis, and Sebastian (1521) for the church of San Francesco in Ravenna.

He was noted to have been influenced by Melozzo da Forli, although the latter had died in 1494. He painted altarpieces (dated 1521) for the sacristy of the Castel San Pietro in Imola.
