= 1575 in art =

Events from the year 1575 in art.

== Events ==
- June - The bronze fauns on Bartolommeo Ammanati's Fountain of Neptune in Florence are completed.
- Approximate date - Lavinia Fontana begins her career in Bologna as the first female career artist in Western Europe.

== Works ==
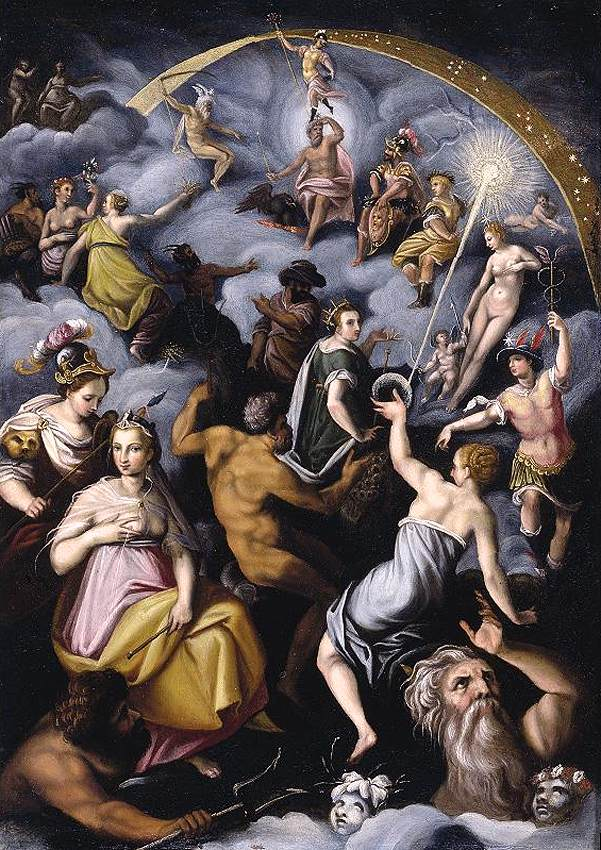
Zucchi – The Assembly of the Gods, private collection

- Alessandro Allori - Christ and the Samaritan Woman (Altarpiece for Basilica of Santa Maria Novella, Florence; now Prato)
- Federico Barocci - Madonna and Child with the Infant John the Baptist and St Joseph (Madonna with the Cat) (approximate date; National Gallery, London)
- Lavinia Fontana - Monkey Child (her earliest known work; now lost)
- Titian - Saint Jerome in Penitence
- Paolo Veronese - Mystical Marriage of St. Catherine
- Jacopo Zucchi – The Assembly of the Gods
- - The Darley Portrait
  - The Phoenix Portrait

== Births ==
- November 4 – Guido Reni, Italian painter (died 1642)
- date unknown
  - Hendrick van Balen, Flemish painter from Antwerp (died 1632)
  - Giovanni Andrea Donducci, Italian painter of the Bolognese School (painting) (died 1655)
  - Marcello Provenzale, Italian painter and mosaicist (died 1639)
  - Tommaso Salini, Italian painter of still life (died 1625)
  - Abraham van Blijenberch, Flemish painter (died 1624)
- probable
  - Jacques Bellange, French artist and printmaker from Lorraine (died 1616)
  - Orazio Borgianni, Italian painter and etcher of the Mannerist and early-baroque periods (died 1616)
  - Bartolomé de Cárdenas, Spanish painter (died 1628)
  - Domenico Falcini, Flemish Renaissance painter and engraver (died 1632)
  - Floris van Dyck, Dutch still life painter (died 1651)
  - (born 1575/1580) Tanzio da Varallo, Italian painter of the late-Mannerist or early Baroque period (died 1632/1633)
  - (born 1575/1580) Gillis d'Hondecoeter, Dutch painter who worked in a Flemish style (died 1638)
  - (born 1575/1580) Abraham van der Doort, Dutch-born artist and curator (died 1640)

== Deaths ==
- June 2 – Pieter Aertsen, Dutch painter (born 1508)
- October 8 - Jan Matsys, Flemish painter (born c.1510)
- October 20 - Cornelis Floris de Vriendt, Flemish sculptor and architect (born 1514)
- November - Corneille de Lyon, Dutch painter (born 1505)
- December 29 - Giovanni Battista Scultori, Italian painter, sculptor and engraver (born 1503)
- date unknown
  - Wen Boren, Chinese landscape painter of the Ming Dynasty (born 1502)
  - Federico Brandani, Italian sculptor and stuccoist who worked in an urbane Mannerist style as a court artist (born 1522/1525)
  - Lodovico Lombardo, Italian sculptor (born c.1507)
  - Giuseppe Porta, Italian painter active mainly in Venice (born 1520)
