= Henry Cooke (artist) =

English artist

Henry Cooke (1642–1700), son of Henry Cooke, was an English artist, employed by the Ironmongers' Company.

Cooke went to Italy where he studied under Salvator Rosa. He painted the choir of New College Chapel, Oxford, the staircase at Ranelagh House, and Lord Carlisle's House in Soho Square. He died in 1700.

It is said that he committed a murder and fled from England; and that after his return, he was employed by King William to "repair" the Cartoons of Raphael. He finished the portrait of Charles II at Chelsea Hospital; and also tried portrait painting, but gave it up.
