= Matteo de Fedeli =

Italian painter

Matteo de Fedeli (1450–1505) was an Italian Renaissance painter.

Not much is known about Matteo de Fedeli's life except through his works. He was born in the Lombardy region, and his style puts him in the Milanese School. He primarily painted religious-themed works for local church commissions. He died in 1505. One of his works Saint Christopher is part of the Christ Church, Oxford collection.

His son Gian Antonio de Fedeli was also a painter.
