= Willem Mahue =

Flemish painter

Willem, or Guillaume Mahue (1517 in Brussels – 1569 in Brussels), a Flemish painter, was a portrait painter of great repute in his time; but his pictures are rare, and we have no particulars of his life.

Cornelis de Bie mentioned him in his Het Gulden Cabinet in 1668 as a prolific painter in his day, but no known works survive.
