= Jacopo Barbello =

Italian painter

Jacopo Barbello (1590–1656) was an Italian painter of the Baroque period. Born in Cremona, he trained in Naples. He painted in Brescia and Bergamo.
