= Willem van der Vliet =

Dutch Golden Age painter

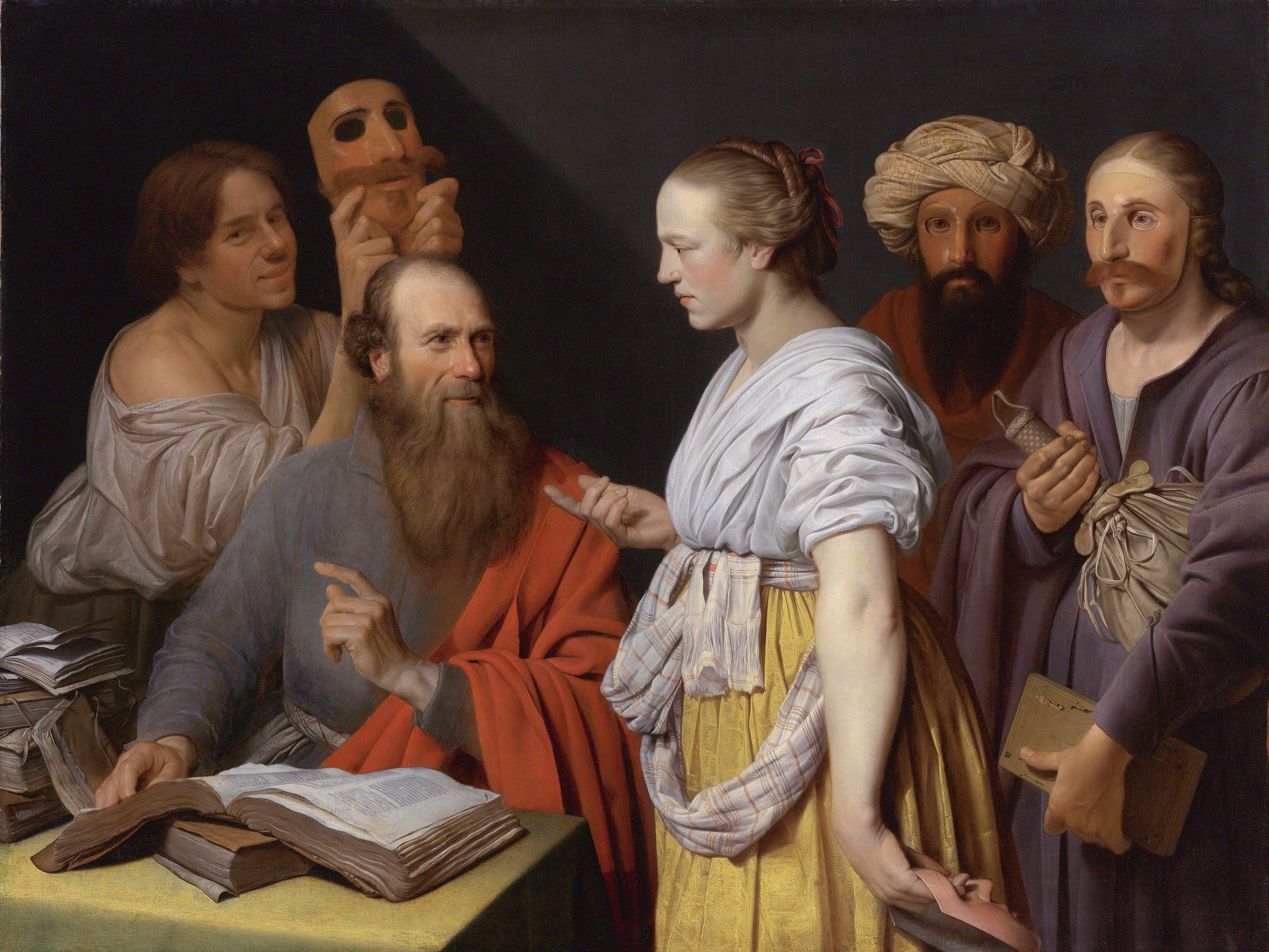
An Allegory - 1627.

Willem van der Vliet (c. 1584 – 6 December 1642) was a Dutch Golden Age painter.

== Biography ==
Van der Vliet was born and died in Delft. According to Houbraken his paintings are historical allegories and portraits. Records of his paintings are noted by the Delft history writer (unspecified Stads schryver). He had his nephew Hendrick Cornelisz. van Vliet as his pupil, who painted historical scenes in architectural perspectives, but who later went to work for Michiel Jansz van Mierevelt to learn to paint portraits. Houbraken preferred his (he means Hendrick's) church interiors in the style of Emanuel de Witte.
