= Pietro Francesco Alberti =

Italian painter

Pietro Francesco Alberti (1584–1638) was an Italian painter and engraver for the late-Renaissance and early-Baroque periods.

He was born at Sansepolcro into a family of artists, the son of painter Durante Alberti from Sansepolcro. He painted historical subjects in the style of his father, and has left works in Rome and in his birthplace. He was the engraver of a plate called Accademia de' Pittori a large print lengthways. He died in Rome.
