= 1589 in art =

Events from the year 1589 in art.

== Events ==
- Painter, sculptor and architect Willem Boy takes a leading role in the construction of the fortifications at Vaxholm, Sweden.

== Paintings ==
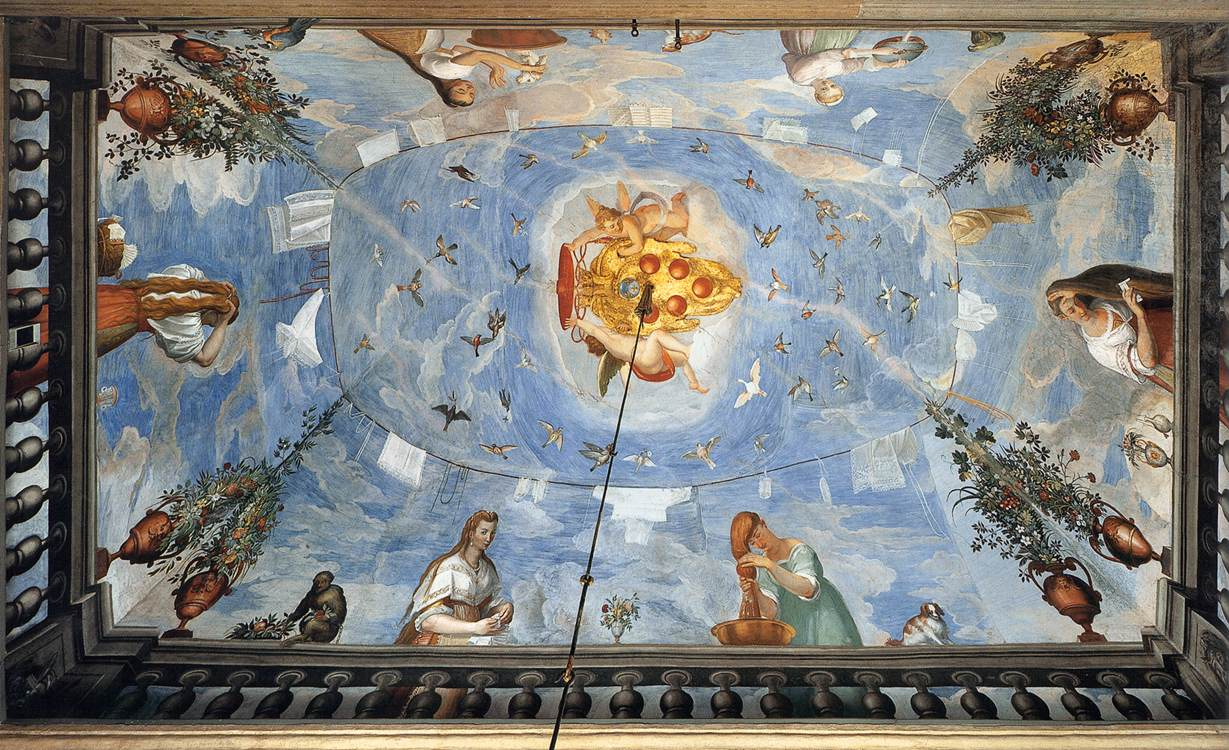
Allori – Women on a Terrace, Palazzo Pitti

- Anonymous - Portrait of Sir Christopher Hatton
- Annibale Carracci - Two Children Teasing a Cat (approximate date)
- Hieronimo Custodis
  - Elizabeth Brydges
  - Giles Brydges, 3rd Baron Chandos
- Cornelis van Haarlem - The First Family (approximate date)
- Lavinia Fontana - Holy Family (El Escorial)
- Quentin Matsys - Vision of the Prophet Ezekiel (approximate date)
- Kaspar Memberger
  - Virgin and Child
  - Wolf-Dietrich von Raitenau, prince-archbishop of Salzburg
- Tintoretto - Portrait of Nicolaus Padavinus
- Jacopo Zucchi - Amor and Psyche

== Births ==
- July 16 - Sinibaldo Scorza, Italian painter, draughtsman and etcher (died 1631)
- August 12 - Domenico Fiasella, Italian painter of primarily frescoes (died 1669)
- date unknown
  - Johannes van der Beeck, Dutch painter (died 1644)
  - Adriaen van de Venne, Dutch Baroque painter of allegories, genre subjects and portraits (died 1662)
  - Giovanni Francesco Guerrieri - Italian painter and Caravaggisti (died 1655)
  - Kanō Sansetsu, Japanese painter (died 1651)
  - Bernardino Capitelli, Italian painter and etcher of the Baroque period (died 1639)
- probable
  - Domenico Fetti, Italian painter (died 1624)
  - Sebastian Furck, German engraver (died 1666)
  - Hercules Seghers, Dutch painter and printmaker of the Dutch Golden Age (died 1638)

== Deaths ==
- date unknown
  - Quentin Metsys the Younger, Flemish painter (born 1543)
  - Cornelis Molenaer, Flemish painter (born 1540)
  - Heo Nanseolheon, Korean poet and painter (born 1563)
  - Sesson Shukei, Japanese Zen monk and painter of the Muromachi period (born 1504)
- probable - Bernard Palissy, French potter and craftsman (born 1510)
