= 1525 in art =

Events from the year 1525 in art.

== Events ==
- Albrecht Dürer publishes his work on geometry, The Four Books on Measurement ("Underweysung der Messung mit dem Zirckel und Richtscheyt" or "Instructions for Measuring with Compass and Ruler") at Nuremberg
- Lucas Horenbout is named royal "pictor maker" to King Henry VIII of England, and will introduce the techniques of portrait miniatures to England
- Jan Cornelisz Vermeyen is named Court Painter to Archduchess Margaret of Austria

== Works ==
=== Painting ===
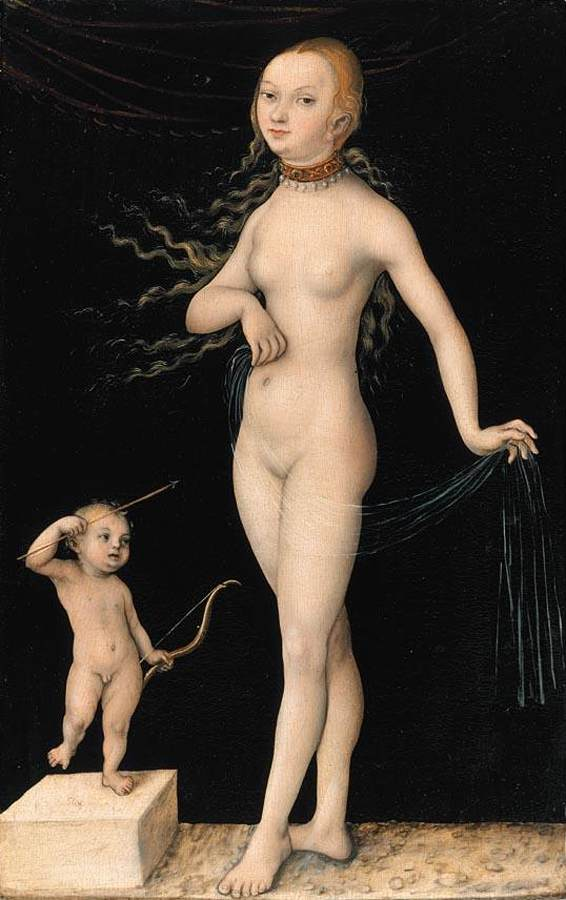
Cranach – Venus and Cupid, private collection

- Lucas Cranach the Elder
  - Cardinal Albert of Brandenburg before Christ on the Cross (approximate date)
  - Venus and Cupid
- Antonio da Correggio – Venus with Mercury and Cupid or The School of Love (approximate date)
- Michelangelo – Head of Bearded Man Shouting
- Pontormo – Youth in a Pink Cloak
- Jan Provoost – Last Judgment (Groeningemuseum)
- Nicola da Urbino – Panel with the Adoration of the Magi
- Bernard van Orley – The Last Judgment (triptych, commissioned for Antwerp)
- Bartolomeo Veneto – Flora (approximate date)
- Pseudo Jan Wellens de Cock – The Crucifixion (triptych, approximate date)

=== Sculpture ===
- Conrad Meit – Judith with the head of Holofernes (alabaster)

=== Armor ===
- Kolman Helmschmid – Portions of a Costume Armor (Metropolitan Museum of Art)

== Births ==
- date unknown
  - Cesare Baglioni, Italian painter specializing in quadratura (died 1590)
  - Pieter Balten, Flemish Renaissance painter (died 1584)
  - Ferrando Bertelli, Italian engraver of the Renaissance period (died unknown)
  - René Boyvin, French engraver who lived in Angers (died 1598)
  - Pieter Bruegel the Elder, Netherlandish Renaissance painter and printmaker known for his landscapes and peasant scenes (died 1569)
  - Ascanio Condivi, Italian painter and writer, primarily remembered as the biographer of Michelangelo (died 1574)
  - Cristofano dell'Altissimo, Italian painter primarily working in Florence (died 1605)
  - Guillaume Le Bé, French engraver (died 1598)
  - Giulio Mazzoni, Italian painter and stuccoist (died 1618)
  - Francesco Terzi, Italian painter of primarily religious themes (died 1600)
  - Giovanni Maria Verdizotti, Venetian artist and poet (died 1600)
  - Juan Valverde de Amusco, Italian anatomist and engraver (died 1587)
  - Francisco Venegas, Spanish painter active in Portugal (died 1594)
  - Alessandro Vittoria, Italian Mannerist sculptor of the Venetian school (died 1608)
  - Song Xu, Chinese landscape painter (died unknown)
- 1525/1530: Hans Collaert, Flemish engraver (died 1580)

== Deaths ==
- January 24 - Franciabigio, Italian painter of the Florentine Renaissance (born 1482)
- June - Girolamo di Benvenuto, Italian painter, son of Benvenuto di Giovanni (born 1470)
- June 10 - Tosa Mitsunobu, Japanese painter and founder of the Tosa school of painting (born 1434)
- August 4 - Andrea della Robbia, Italian Renaissance sculptor, especially in ceramics (born 1435)
- date unknown
  - Bernardino Bergognone - Italian Renaissance painter of the Milanese school (born 1455)
  - Boccaccio Boccaccino, Italian painter of the Emilian school (born 1467)
  - Vittore Carpaccio, Italian painter of the Venetian school (born 1460)
  - Nunziata d'Antonio, Italian painter, fireworks artist, and bombardier (born 1468)
  - Attavante degli Attavanti, Italian miniature painter (born 1452)
  - Ortolano Ferrarese, Italian painter of the Ferrara School (born 1480 or 1490)
  - Davide Ghirlandaio, Italian painter and mosaicist (born 1452)
  - Michael Sittow, painter from modern Estonia who was trained in the tradition of Early Netherlandish painting (born 1469)
  - Sōami, Japanese painter and landscape artist (b. unknown)
  - Jacob van Utrecht, Flemish early Renaissance painter (born 1479)
