= 1519 in art =

Events from the year 1519 in art.

== Paintings ==
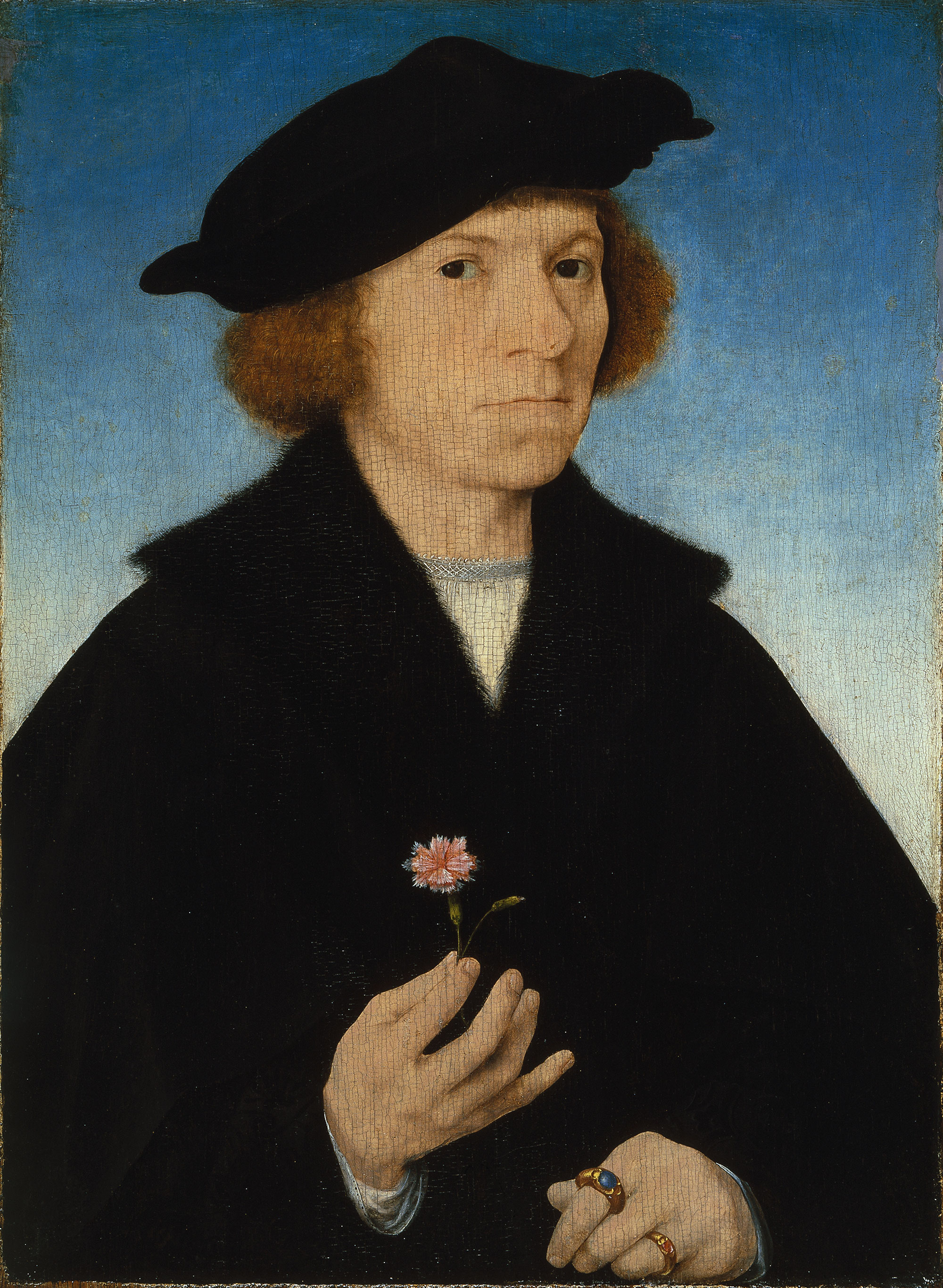
van Cleve – Self-Portrait, Thyssen-Bornemisza Museum

- Girolamo Alibrandi paints the Presentation at the Temple.
- Hans Burckmair paints a panel picture of the Crucifixion, with St. George and the Emperor Heinrich on the wings.
- Albrecht Dürer paints St Anne with the Virgin and Child.
- Sebastiano del Piombo paints The Raising of Lazarus and Portrait of a Man, said to be Christopher Columbus.
- Raffaello Sanzio paints Pope Leo X with Cardinals Giulio de'Medici and Luigi de'Rossi.
- Titian finishes painting The Worship of Venus (Madrid, Museo del Prado).
- Bernard van Orley paints Joris van Zelle.
- Wen Cheng-ming paints Scholars at Leisure in a Precipitous Ravine.
- The portrait of Emperor Maximilian in Nürnberg is painted.

== Births ==
- April 17 - Frans Floris, Flemish historical painter (died 1570)
- date unknown - Pedro de Villegas Marmolejo, Spanish sculptor and painter (died 1596)

== Deaths ==
- May 2 – Leonardo da Vinci, Italian architect, anatomist, sculptor, engineer, inventor, geometer, scientist, mathematician, musician and painter (born 1452)
- July 2 - Francesco Bonsignori, Italian painter (born 1455)
- November 30 - Michael Wolgemut, German painter and printmaker (born 1434)
- date unknown
  - Alexander Bening, miniature painter of the Ghent-Bruges school and Netherlandish tradition (born unknown)
  - Domenico Fancelli, Italian sculptor working in Spain (born 1469)
  - Ambrosius Holbein, German and Swiss artist in painting, drawing and printmaking (born 1494)
  - Jan Joest, Dutch painter (born 1450/1460)
  - Antoine Juste, Italian sculptor (born 1479)
  - Juan de Flandes, Early Netherlandish painter who was active in Spain (born 1460)
  - Jan Polack, Polish-born German painter (born 1435)
  - Bartholomäus Zeitblom, German painter and the chief master of the school of Ulm (born 1450)
