= 1505 in art =

Events from the year 1505 in art.

== Events ==
- Pope Julius II summons Michelangelo to Rome to design the pope's tomb. The contract is revised five times and only three of forty large figures are ever executed.

== Works ==
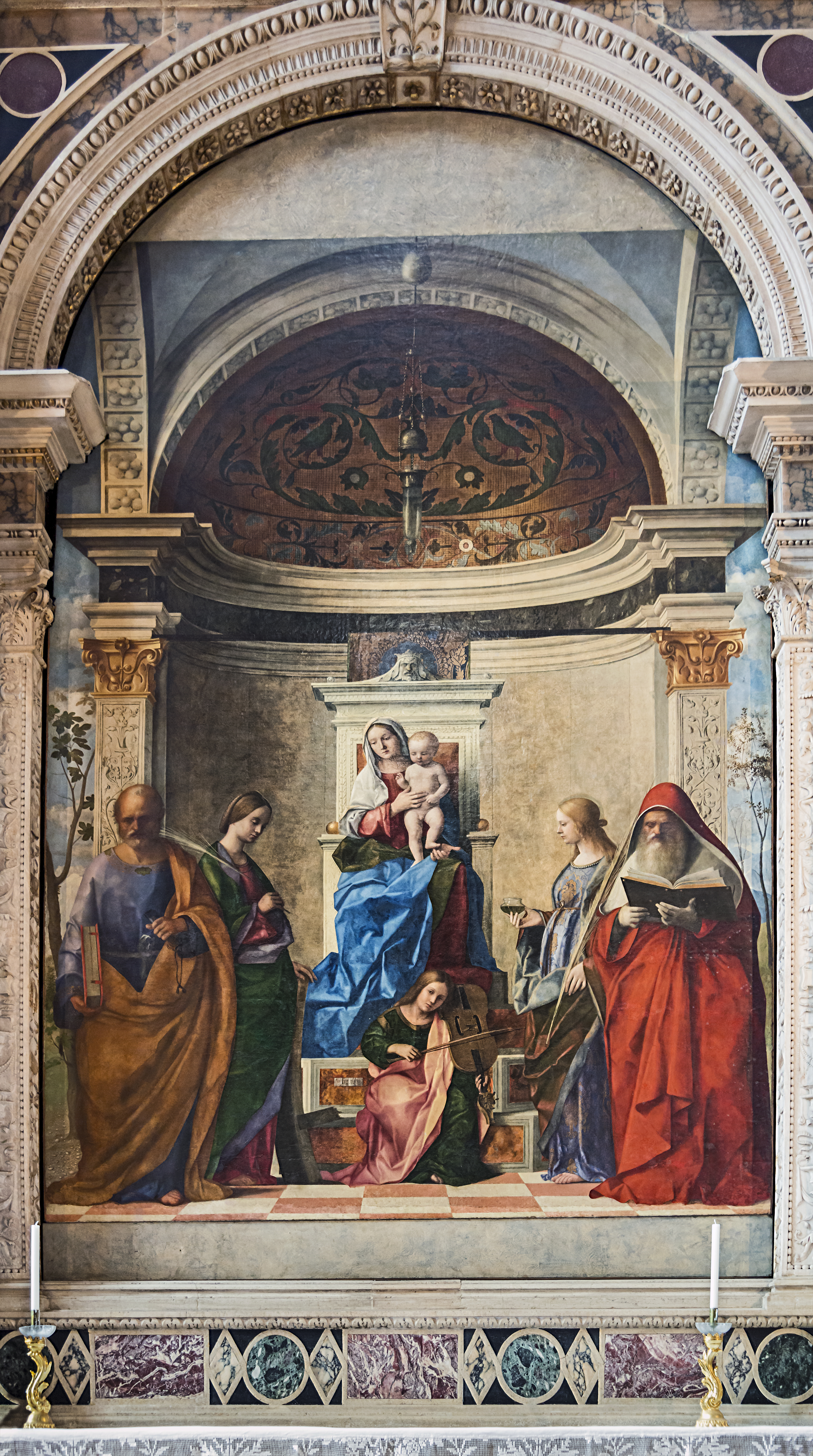
Bellini, San Zaccaria Altarpiece

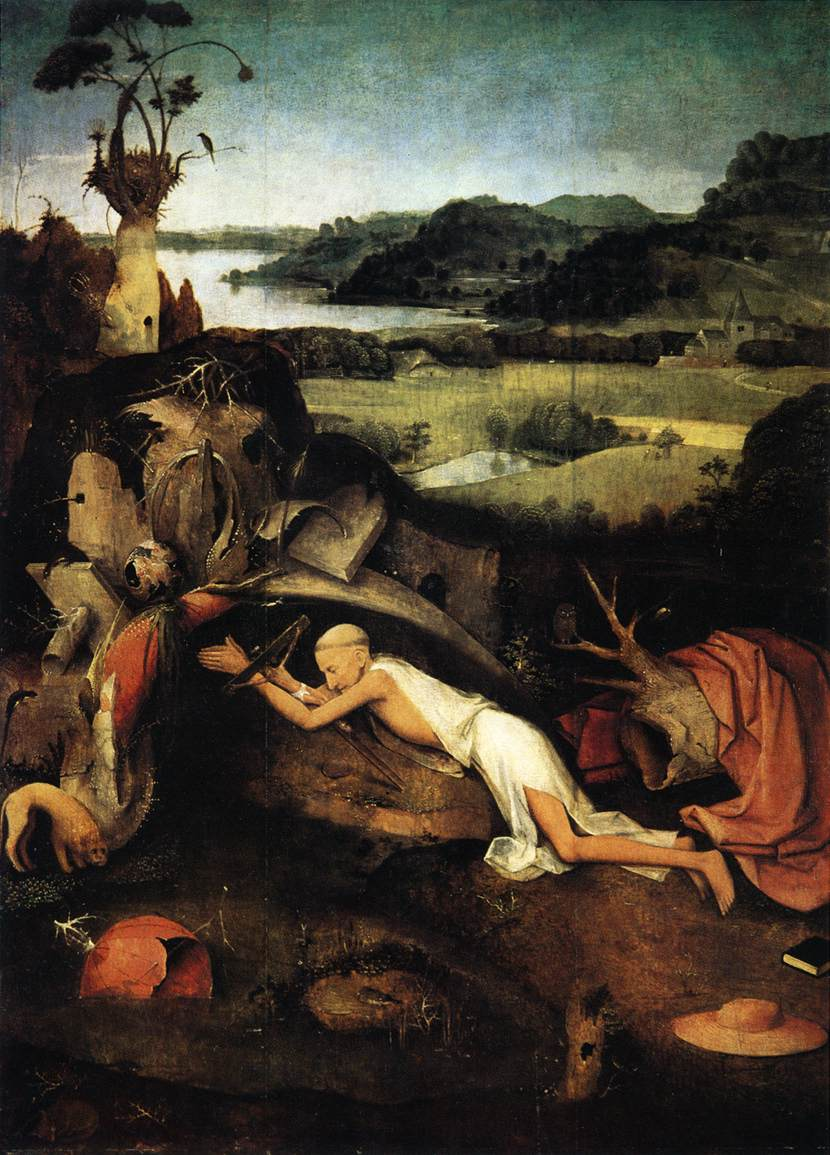
Bosch, St. Jerome at Prayer

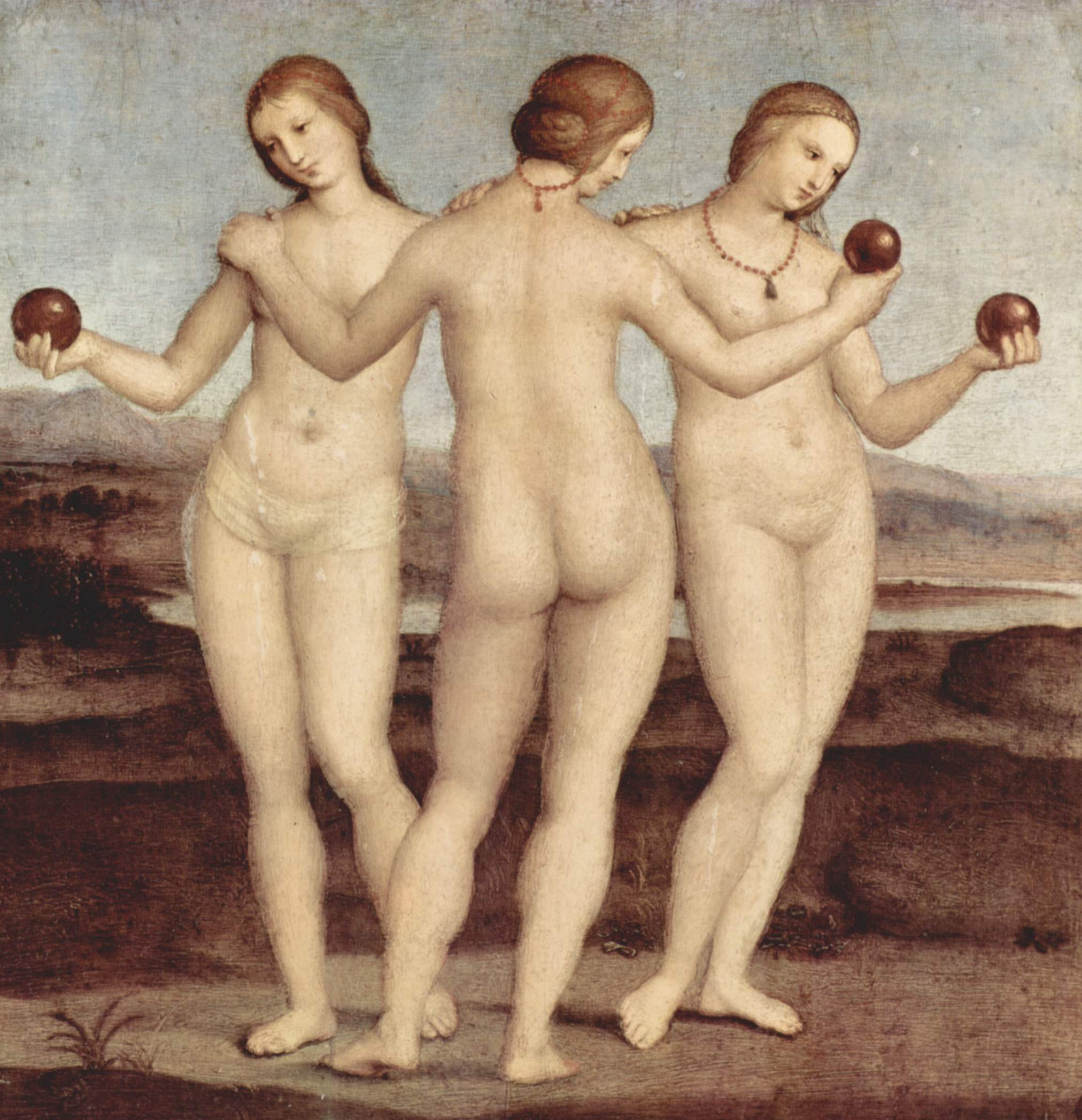
Raphael, Three Graces

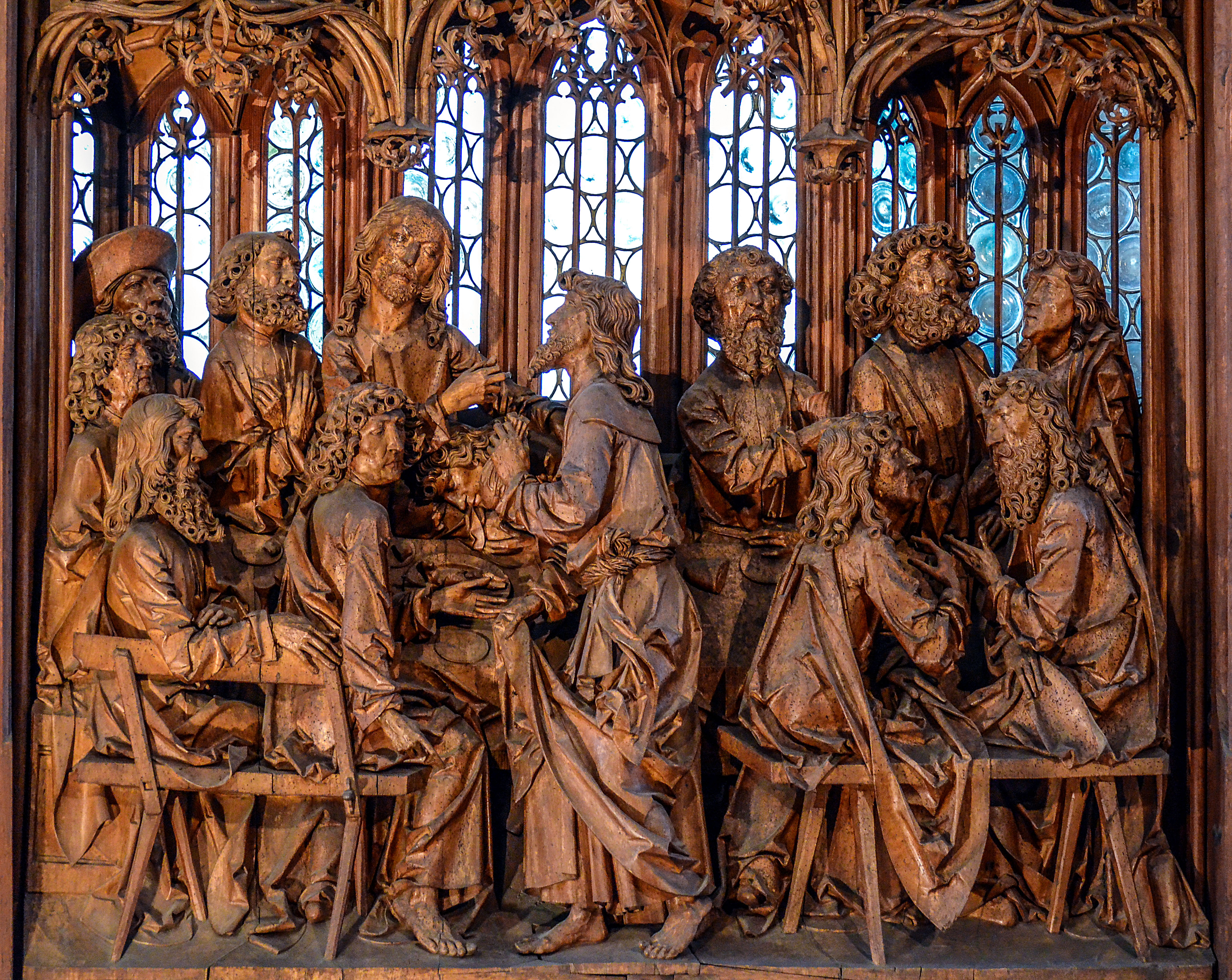
Riemenschneider, Holy Blood altarpiece

Many dates approximate

- Giovanni Bellini
  - Madonna del Prato
  - San Zaccaria Altarpiece
- Hieronymus Bosch
  - The Hermit Saint (triptych)
  - St. Jerome at Prayer
- Vittore Carpaccio
  - Holy Family and donors
  - Preparation of Christ's Tomb
- Piero di Cosimo
  - The Finding of Vulcan on Lemnos
  - The Adoration of the Christ Child
  - The Forest Fire
- Albrecht Dürer - Portrait of a Young Venetian Woman
- Giorgione - The Three Philosophers
- Leonardo da Vinci – The Battle of Anghiari (lost painting)
- Lorenzo Lotto
  - Allegory of Virtue and Vice
  - Portrait of Bishop Bernardo de' Rossi
- Andrea Previtali – Scenes from Tebaldeo's Eclogues
- Raphael
  - Christ Blessing
  - Madonna and Child Enthroned with Saints
  - Madonna del Granduca
  - St. Michael
  - Small Cowper Madonna
  - Three Graces
  - Young Man with an Apple
- Tilman Riemenschneider - Holy Blood altarpiece, St. James's Church, Rothenburg ob der Tauber (woodcarving, completed)
- Portrait of Henry VII of England

== Births ==
- date unknown
  - Pomponio Amalteo, Italian painter of the Venetian school (died 1588)
  - Lambert Lombard, Flemish Renaissance painter, architect and theorist for the Prince-Bishopric of Liège (died 1566)
  - Jakob Seisenegger, Austrian portrait painter used by Charles V (died 1567)
- probable
  - Cornelis Anthonisz., Dutch painter, engraver and mapmaker (died 1553)
  - Pierre Bontemps, French sculptor (died 1568)
  - Matthys Cock, Flemish landscape painter (died 1548)
  - Juste de Juste, Franco-Italian sculptor and printmaker in etching (died 1559)
  - Jacques Du Brœucq, Dutch sculptor and architect (died 1584)
  - Léonard Limousin, French painter, member of Limoges enamel painter family (died 1577)

== Deaths ==
- date unknown
  - Andrea Aleksi, Albanian architect, painter and sculptor (born 1425)
  - Matteo de Fedeli, Italian Renaissance painter (born 1450)
  - Filippo Mazzola, Italian Renaissance painter (born 1460)
  - Francesco Marmitta, Italian painter and jeweller (born 1460)
  - Ni Duan, Imperial Chinese painter of people and landscapes (born 1436)
  - Sebastiano Schiavone da Rovigno, Venetian woodcarver and marquetry artist ("Zoppo") (born 1420)
- probable - Bartolomeo Caporali, Italian painter (born 1420)
