= Santa Maria Assunta, Orzinuovi =

Church building in Lombardy, Italy

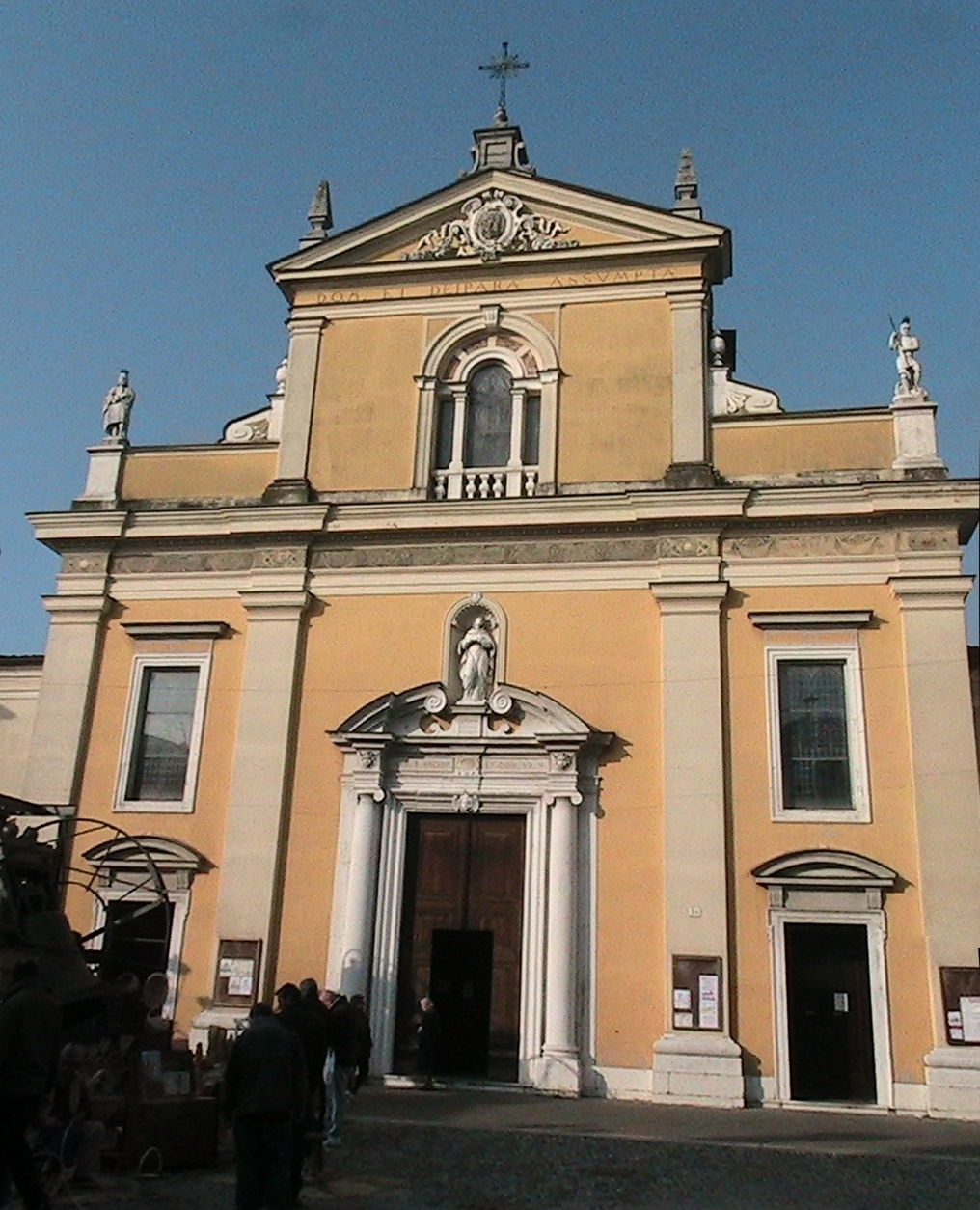
Orzinuovi 02 - Duomo di Santa Maria Assunta.jpg

Santa Maria Assunta (Italian: Chiesa parrochiale di Santa Maria Assunta), is a 14th-century Roman Catholic parish church in Orzinuovi, Province of Brescia, in the region of Lombardy, Italy. It is the principal church, or duomo, of the town. The structure includes both Gothic and Renaissance elements.

== History ==
The original church here was probably built in Romanesque style. During the rule of the Visconti in the 14th century, a larger church was constructed in the Lombard Gothic style. In the 16th century it was rebuilt, and at this time semi-circular arches replaced the earlier pointed arches. In the same century the orientation of the church was reversed, making the façade front onto the piazza. At the end of the 19th century a further reconstruction reverted the church structure to that of the 16th century. In 1969–70, the bell tower was demolished because of its instability.

== Interior ==
The Chapel of the Rosary contains a painting depicting San Carlo grants Orzinuovi to the Virgin by Grazio Cossali. Two other chapels have altarpieces attributed to Pietro Maria Bagnatore, The Guardian Angel and Baptism of Christ, each found in the chapel of the same name. The main altarpiece, an Assumption of the Virgin, is attributed to Luca Mombello.
