= Adoration of the Shepherds with Saints Nazarius and Celsus =

Painting by Moretto da Brescia

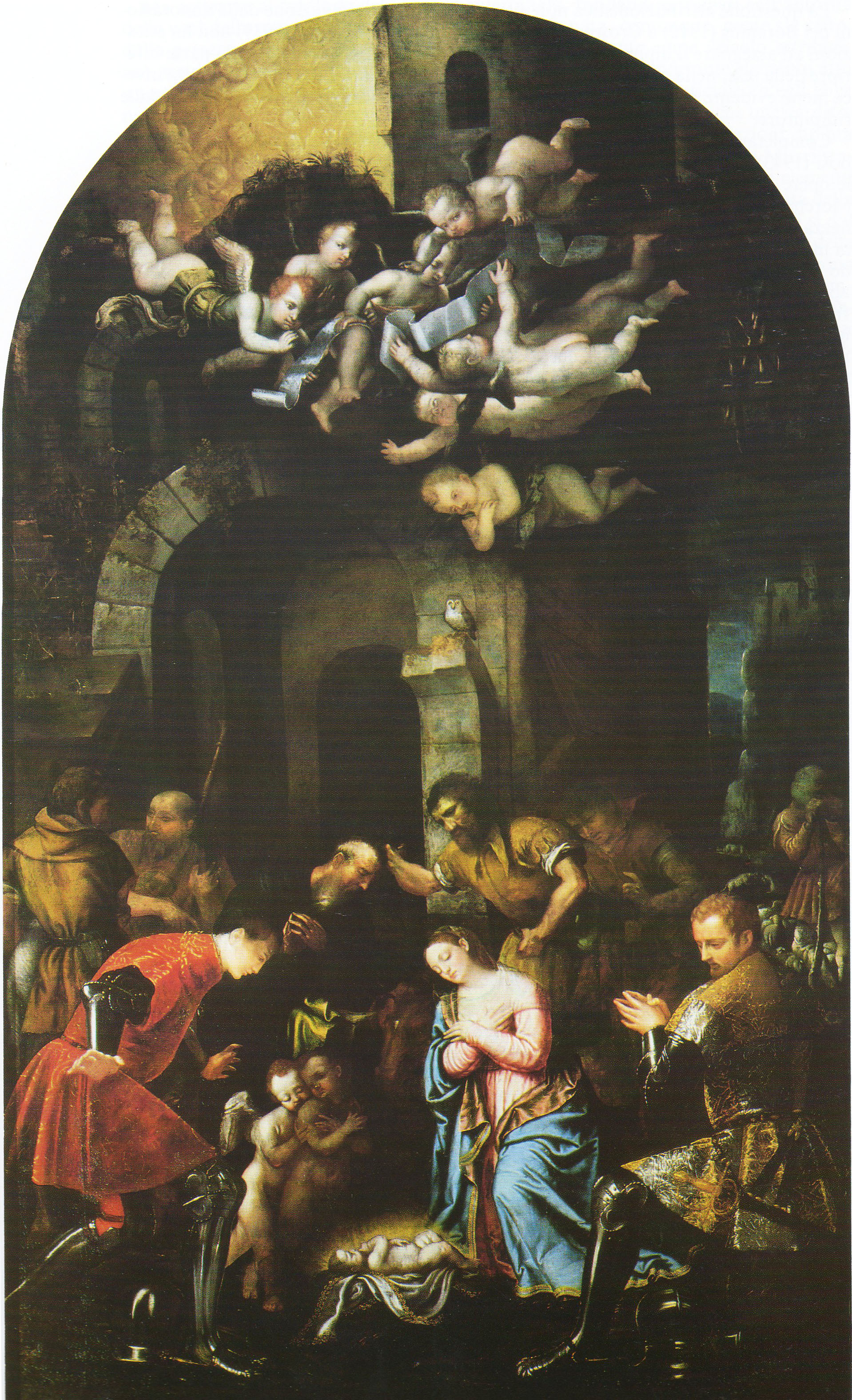
Adoration of the Shepherds with Saints Nazarius and Celsus (1540) by Moretto da Brescia

Adoration of the Shepherds with Saints Nazarius and Celsus is a 1540 oil on canvas painting by Moretto da Brescia in the church of Santi Nazaro e Celso in Brescia. As its title suggests, it shows Nazarius and Celsus, patron saints of the church.

It is one of the painter's most-discussed works and shows his gradual but decisive move towards Mannerism. It was only securely attributed to him from the late 20th century onwards. It includes several unusual compositional elements influenced by other artists. A restoration in 1987 also showed a huge number of pentimenti and corrections.

It is first recorded in 1630 by Bernardino Faino as an altarpiece in the Averoldi Chapel in Santi Nazaro e Celso - he attributed it to Luca Mombello, who had also painted the frescoes on the chapel walls. In later local literature it was ascribed to Herri met de Bles, whose nickname was 'La Civetta' (the owl) - he usually included one in each of his works and one is shown on the ruined arch in Adoration.
