= Averoldi Polyptych =

1520-22 painting by Titian

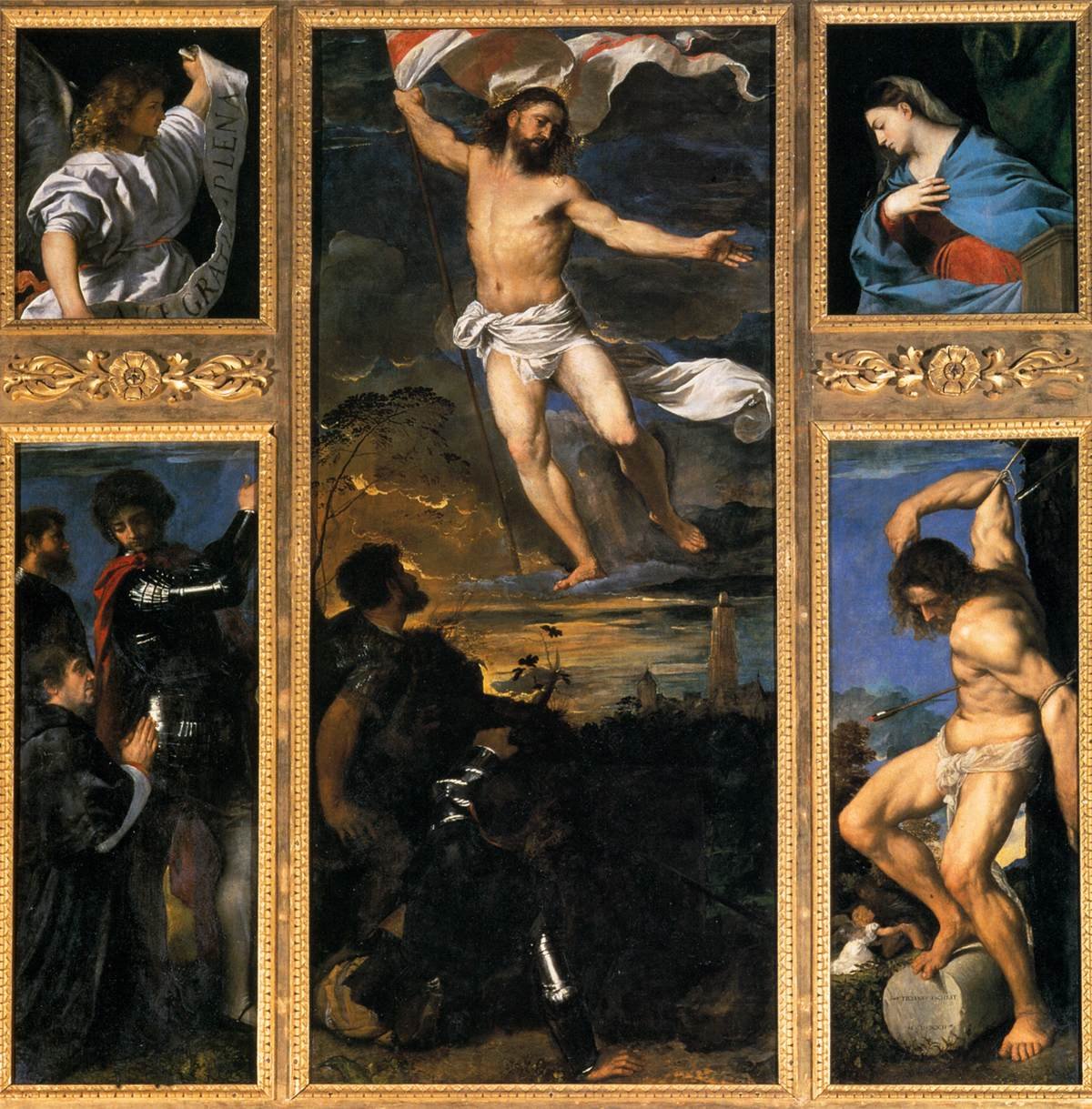
- Artist: Titian
- Year: 1520–1522
- Medium: oil on panel
- Dimensions: 278 cm × 292 cm (109 in × 115 in)
- Location: Santi Nazaro e Celso, Brescia

The Averoldi Polyptych, also known as the Averoldi Altarpiece, is a painting by the Italian Renaissance painter Titian, dating to 1520–1522, in the basilica church of Santi Nazaro e Celso in Brescia, northern Italy.

It is signed "Ticianus Faciebat / MDXXII" on the column of the panel showing St. Sebastian.

== History ==
The work was commissioned by Altobello Averoldi, papal legate to Venice, from Titian during the period when he was the official painter of the Republic of Venice. The work was delivered in 1522, as indicated by Titian's signature in the lower right panel. The large polyptych was placed behind the high altar of the church of Santi Nazaro e Celso of Brescia, replacing another altarpiece by Vincenzo Foppa (of which now a Nativity of Jesus remains in the church of Santa Maria Assunta at Chiesanuova, as well as two side panels in the Pinacoteca Tosio Martinengo). At this time Brescia formed part of Venice's mainland possessions.

A first version of the St. Sebastian panel was offered to Duke Alfonso d'Este of Ferrara in compensation for Titian's late completion of his Bacchanalia. The Duke declined the offer, and the early St. Sebastian was perhaps sent to Mantua, where one such painting is mentioned among the works of art sold by the Gonzaga to Charles I of England. Its whereabouts after that are unknown.

Averoldi subsequently also started to complain about Titian's late delivery.

== Description ==
The use of a compartmentally-divided polyptych, a solution that must have been rather old-fashioned for the time, is likely to have followed a specific request from Averoldi. In any event, Titian managed to produce a certain degree of unity, although not spatially or architecturally, unlike 15th century polyptychs. Instead, the Veneto-born painter adopted a chromatic-dynamic, with a sense of light converging towards the central scene.

The panels are:

- Resurrection of Christ, 278x122 cm
- Saints Nazarius and Celsus with Donor, 170x65 cm
- Saint Sebastian, 170x65
- Angel of the Annunciation, 79x65 cm
- Annunciation of the Virgin, 79x65 cm

The work inspired several Renaissance painters from the Brescia area, including Savoldo and Moretto

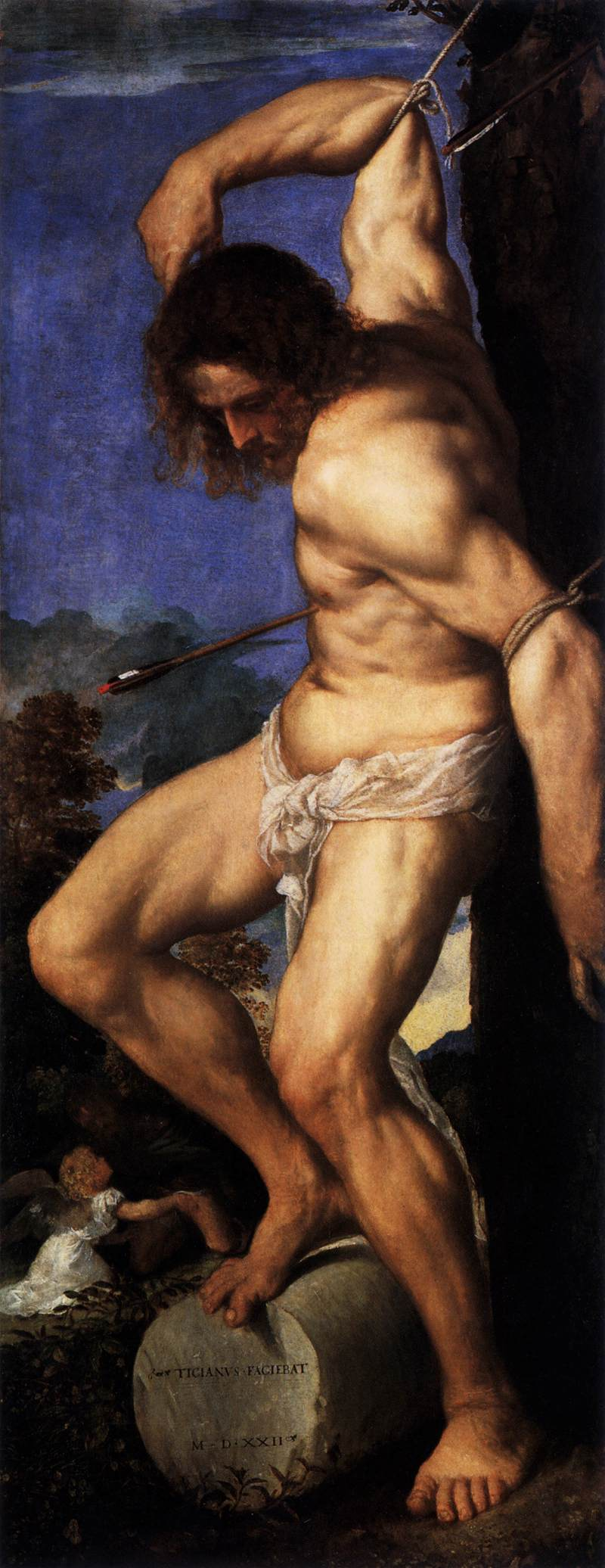
The Martyrdom of Saint Sebastian

=== Resurrection ===
The central scene depicts a triumphant risen Christ, high above, in a dark yellow and grey dawn sky. He holds aloft the banner of the Crusader saint, St. George, as an emblem of the Catholic church. Beneath him is a group of armour-clad soldiers.

The work shows the influence of works by Raphael, such as the Transfiguration (the centripetal position of Christ) and the fresco of the Liberation of Saint Peter for the quasi-nocturnal atmosphere. Another possible influence that has been suggested here is that of Danube school, in details such as the dramatic lighting effects on the landscape. A depiction of the ideal Jerusalem in the background was a Northern European fashion.

=== Saints Nazarius and Celsus with Donor ===
The left panel show the saints Nazarius and Celsus, to whom the church housing the altar was dedicated, on a gloomy background. Nazarius wears shining armor, his disciple, Celsus, behind him. The kneeling donor, Altobello Averoldi, the papal legate to Venice, is portrayed in profile, stylistically reminiscent of the depiction of Sigismondo de' Conti in Raphael's Madonna of Foligno. The influence of Giorgione, who before his death in 1510 had worked with Titian, may be discerned in the calm atmosphere and the dull colors.

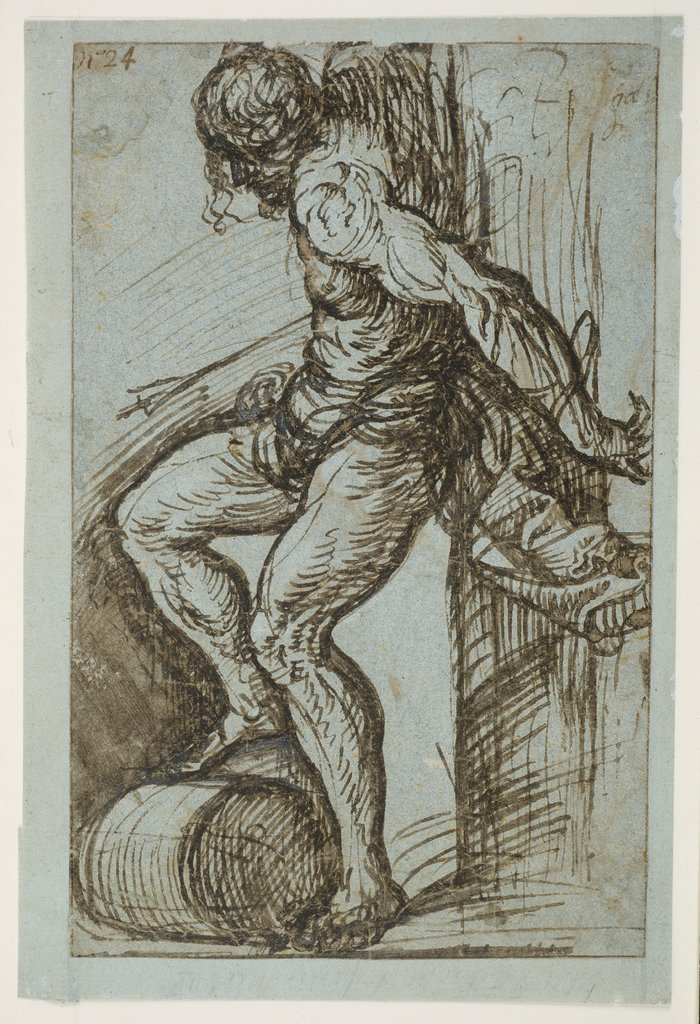
Preparatory drawing for St. Sebastian, now in Frankfurt's Städel.

=== Saint Sebastian ===
The right-hand panel shows a traditional Martyrdom of Saint Sebastian, although in this case the saint is depicted in a rather contorted position. This may be derived from Michelangelo's Punishment of Aman on the Sistine Chapel ceiling, or from Raphael's Fire in the Borgo also in the Vatican. The saint's arms are tied to a tree trunk at different heights; the legs are also differently articulated because Sebastian's right foot rests on a section of a fallen stone column.

It has been suggested that the saint's face resembles that of the risen Christ in the central panel. Some resemblance has also been claimed to Titian himself; he was 30-years-old at the time.

In the background of this panel is an announcing angel. His gaze is directed towards Sebastian and to Saint Roch whom she is attending: prayers to both saints were invoked as a protection against the plague, and Roch's uncovered legs show the characteristic lesions.

Two preparatory drawings of the panel exist: one (16.2 x 13.6 cm) is at the Kupferstichkabinett in Berlin, and another (18.3 x 11.5 cm) is in the Städel in Frankfurt.

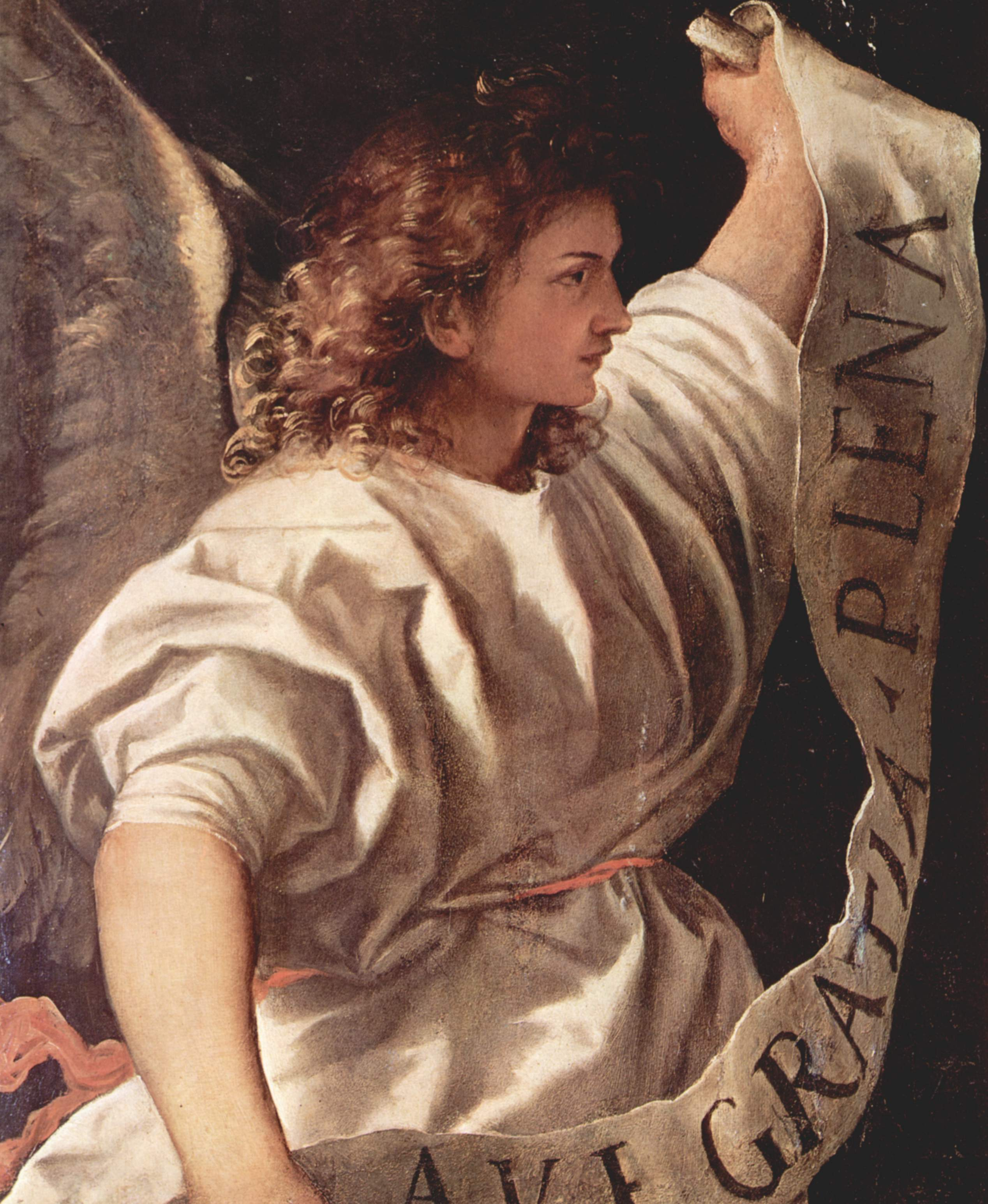
Angel of the Annunciation

=== Annunciation ===
The two upper panels make up an Annunciation, with the announcing angel on the left and the Virgin on the right, according to a tradition dating from the Middle Ages. Titian represented the two figures in strong light, in particular the angel, which is illuminated from behind. His figure is unrolling a cartouche with the Gospel words Ave Gratia Plena, the salutation of the archangel Gabriel to the virgin Mary.

== See also ==
- List of works by Titian
