= Saint Barbara with a Donor =

Painting by Lattanzio Gambara

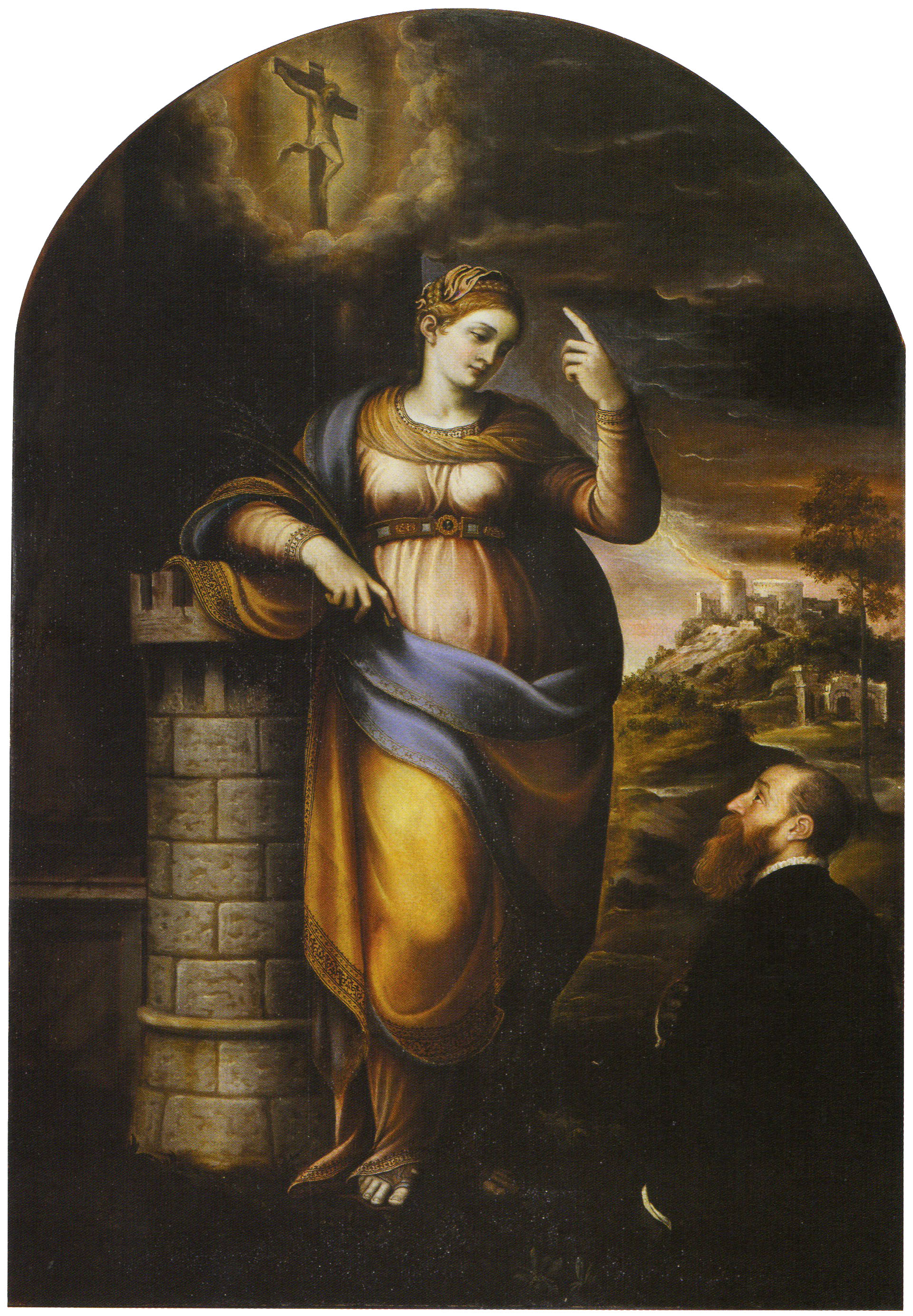
Saint Barbara with a Donor (1558) by Lattanzio Gambara

Saint Barbara with a Donor or Saint Barbara with a Devotee is a 1558 oil on canvas painting by Lattanzio Gambara, originally painted for an altar dedicated to saint Barbara in the church of Santi Nazaro e Celso in Brescia but now on the right-hand side-altar in Santa Maria in Silva church in the same city.

== Bibliography ==
- Francesco De Leonardis, Il patrimonio artistico della chiesa di Santa Maria in Silva in AA.VV., Santa Maria in Silva, Delfo, Brescia 2003
