= William Young Ottley =

British art collector (1771–1836)

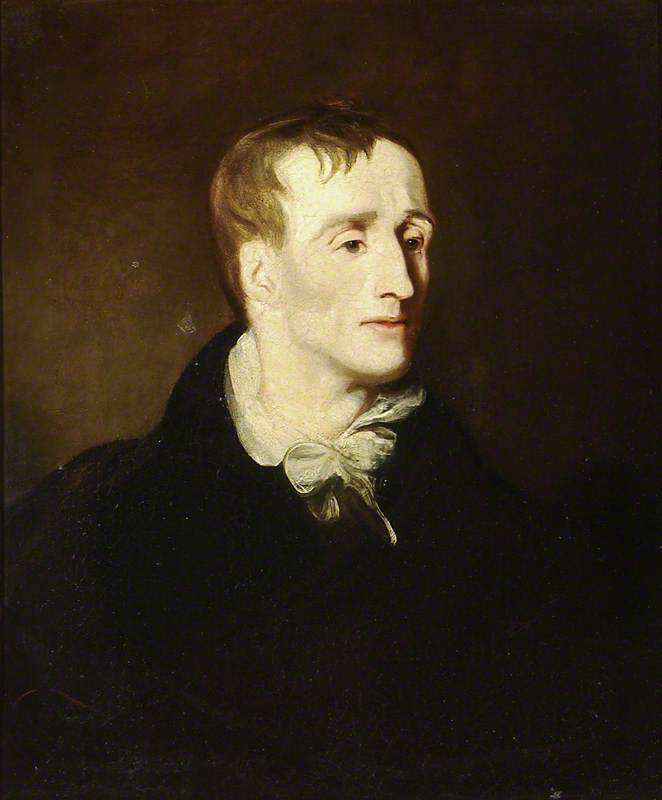
Portrait of William Young Ottley by William Riviere.

William Young Ottley (6 August 1771 – 26 May 1836) was a British collector of and writer on art, amateur artist, and Keeper of the Department of Prints and Drawings at the British Museum. He was an early English enthusiast for 14th- and 15th-century Italian art, or the "Italian Primitives" as they were then often called. He spent the 1790s based in Rome, where he bought much art; this was sold for a considerable profit in 1801 after his return to London.

== Life ==
He was born near Thatcham, Berkshire, the son of Sir Richard Ottley, an officer in the Guards and owner of a plantation in Tobago, and of Sarah Elizabeth Young, daughter of Sir William Young, 1st Baronet, of North Dean. He became a pupil of George Cuitt the Elder, and studied in the Royal Academy of Arts Schools. In 1791 he went to Italy, and stayed there ten years, studying art and collecting pictures, drawings, and prints, profiting from the turmoil of the French invasion. On his return to England he raised large sums by auctioning his 16th- and 17th-century paintings at Christie's in May 1801 (the lots and prices are listed by Buchanan), but the earlier works would at that time have found little or no market in England. He became an arbiter of taste, and assisted collectors in the purchase of works of art and the formation of picture galleries. His own collection of drawings by Italian Old Masters he sold to Sir Thomas Lawrence, a close friend, for £8,000, and his print collection was also very fine. Paintings in his collection included The Mystical Nativity by Botticelli and Raphael's Vision of a Knight, both now in the National Gallery. In 1808 and 1812 he was living at No.43, Frith Street, Soho, London, and by 1818 in Kensington. He had one son, Henry Ottley, who died in Torquay (d. 3 February 1878).

In 1833 Ottley exhibited at the Royal Academy of Art, London an unfinished drawing of The Battle of the Angels. In the same year he was appointed Keeper of the Department of Prints and Drawings in the British Museum, a post he retained till his death in 1836. Some drawings are in the British Museum, which also has catalogues of two sales of his pictures, in 1811 and 1837.

== Works ==
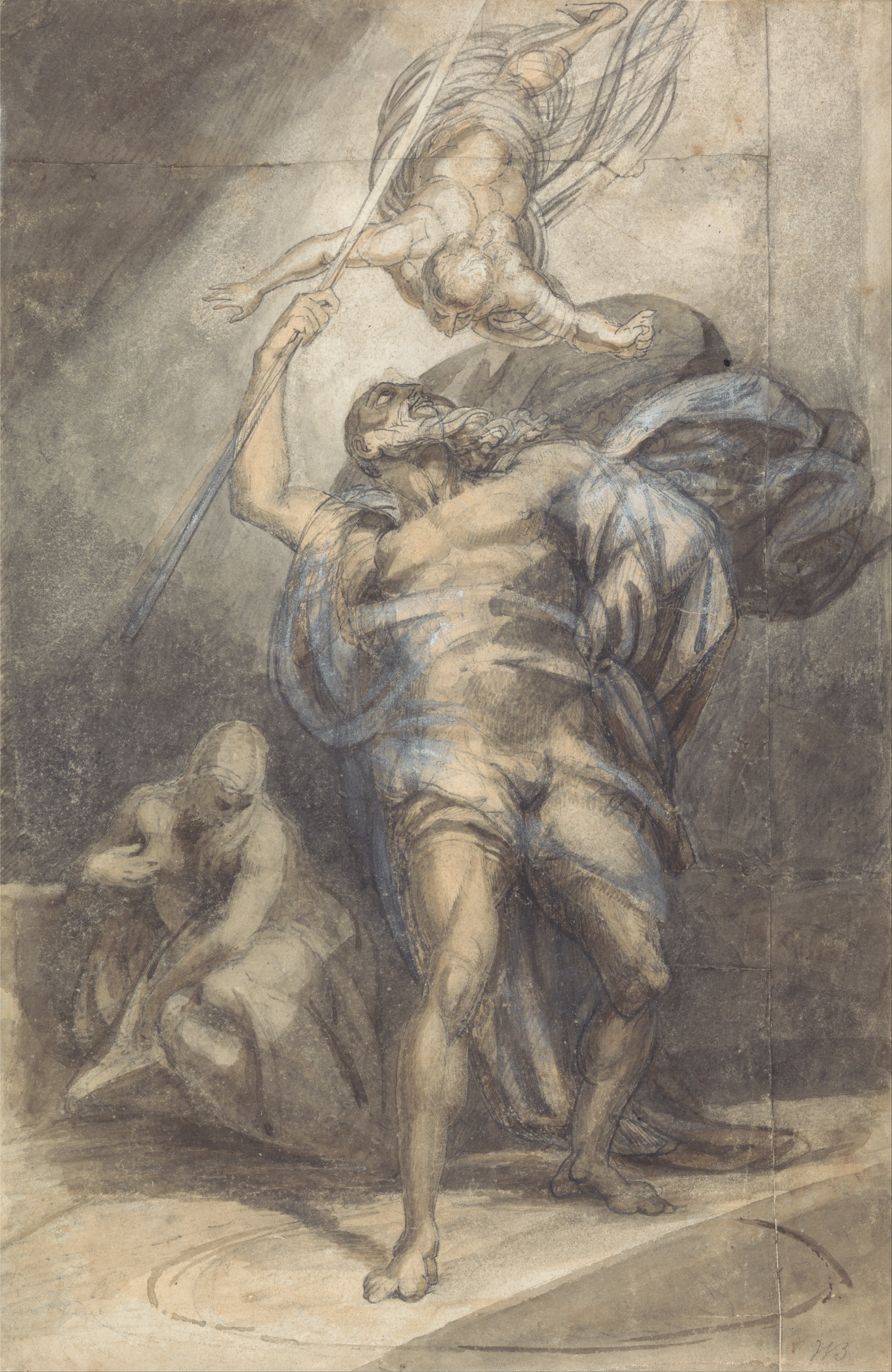
Prospero Summoning Ariel, drawing by Ottley, c. 1800

Ottley was significant in his day as a writer on art, and for the series of illustrated works which he published. He began in 1805 with the first part of The Italian School of Design, a series of etchings by himself, after drawings by the old masters. The second part was published in 1813 and the third in 1823, when the whole work was issued in one volume. In 1816 he published an Inquiry into the Origin and Early History of Engraving on Copper and Wood, which was followed by four folio volumes of engravings of The Stafford Gallery. In 1826 came out A Series of Plates after the Early Florentine Artists. Two volumes followed in 1826–28 of facsimiles, by himself, of prints and etchings by masters of the Italian and other schools. In 1831 he published Notices of Engravers and their Works which was the start of a dictionary of artists, which he decided not to continue; and in 1863, after his death, appeared An Inquiry into the Invention of Printing, a companion to his work on the origin of engraving.

Besides these works, he published in 1801 a catalogue of Italian pictures, which he had acquired during his stay in Italy from the Colonna, Borghese, and Corsini Palaces; A Descriptive Catalogue of the Pictures in the National Gallery, 1826; and Observations on a MS. in the British Museum, in a controversy concerning Cicero's translation of an astronomical poem by Aratus.

== Additional Sources ==
- "Ottley, William Young" . Dictionary of National Biography. London: Smith, Elder & Co. 1885–1900.
- Antony Griffiths, Landmarks in Print Collecting - Connoisseurs and Donors at the British Museum since 1753, 1996, British Museum Press, ISBN 0-7141-2609-8
