= Adoration of the Shepherds (Lotto) =

Painting by Lorenzo Lotto

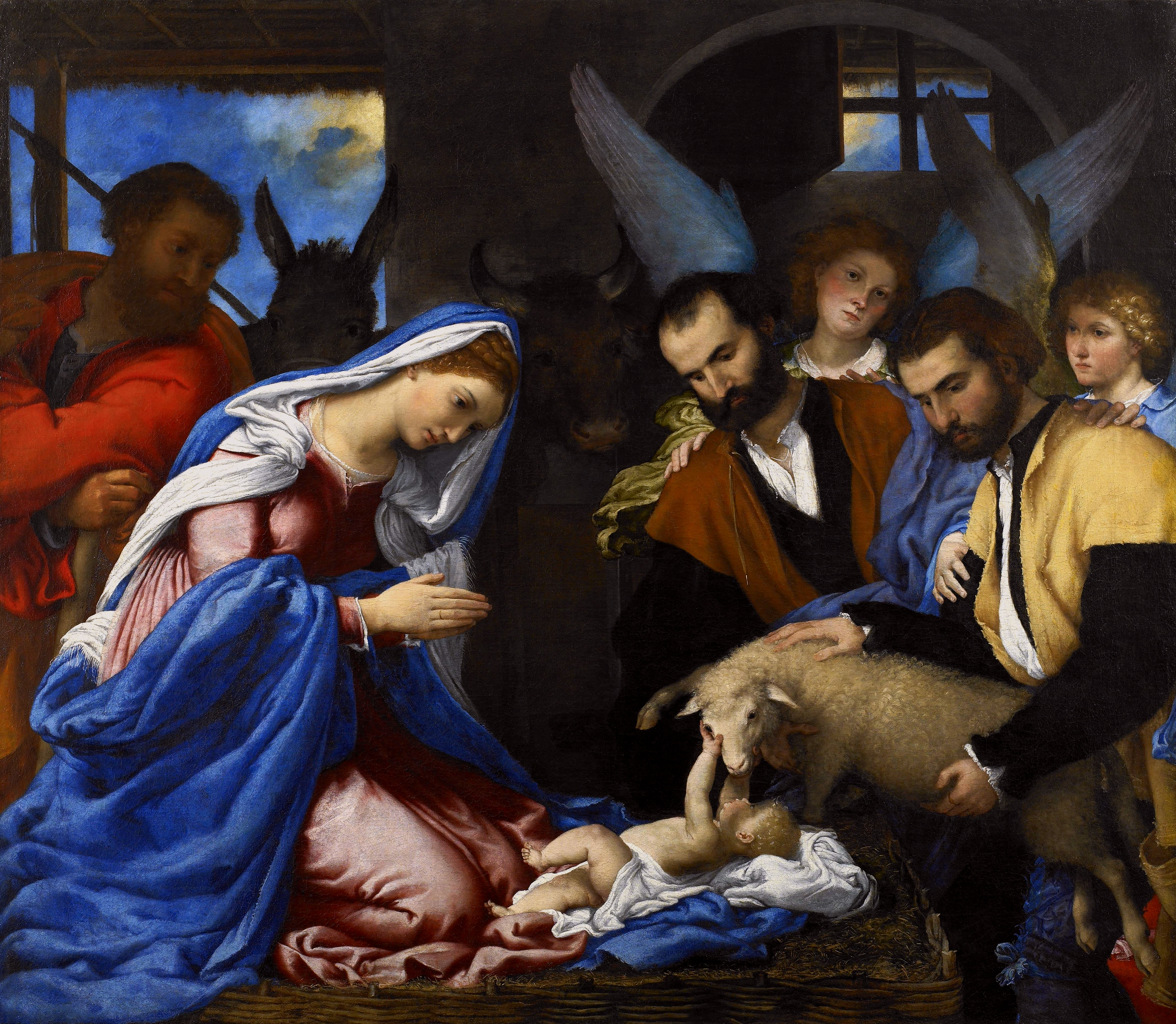
- Artist: Lorenzo Lotto
- Year: c.1534
- Medium: oil on canvas
- Dimensions: 147 cm × 166 cm (58 in × 65 in)
- Location: Pinacoteca Tosio Martinengo, Brescia

Adoration of the Shepherds is a c. 1534 oil-on-canvas painting by the Italian Renaissance artist Lorenzo Lotto, signed "Lottus" and now in the Pinacoteca Tosio Martinengo in Brescia. Its dating is based on stylistic motifs such as the naturalistic details similar to those of the Recanati Annunciation. It also shows similarities to nativities painted around the same time by Girolamo Savoldo, whom Lotto met in Venice. It seems to have been commissioned by Braccio II and Sforza Baglioni, two noblemen from Perugia, who were the models for the two shepherds. They may have met the artist in the Marche during a pilgrimage to Loreto. A ring on Mary's right hand is probably an allusion to the Holy Ring, a relic in Perugia Cathedral, which supports the idea that the work was produced for that city. This provenance is solely based on an account from 1824 by the art dealer who that year sold it to Paolo Tosio, a count from Brescia.

== Gallery ==
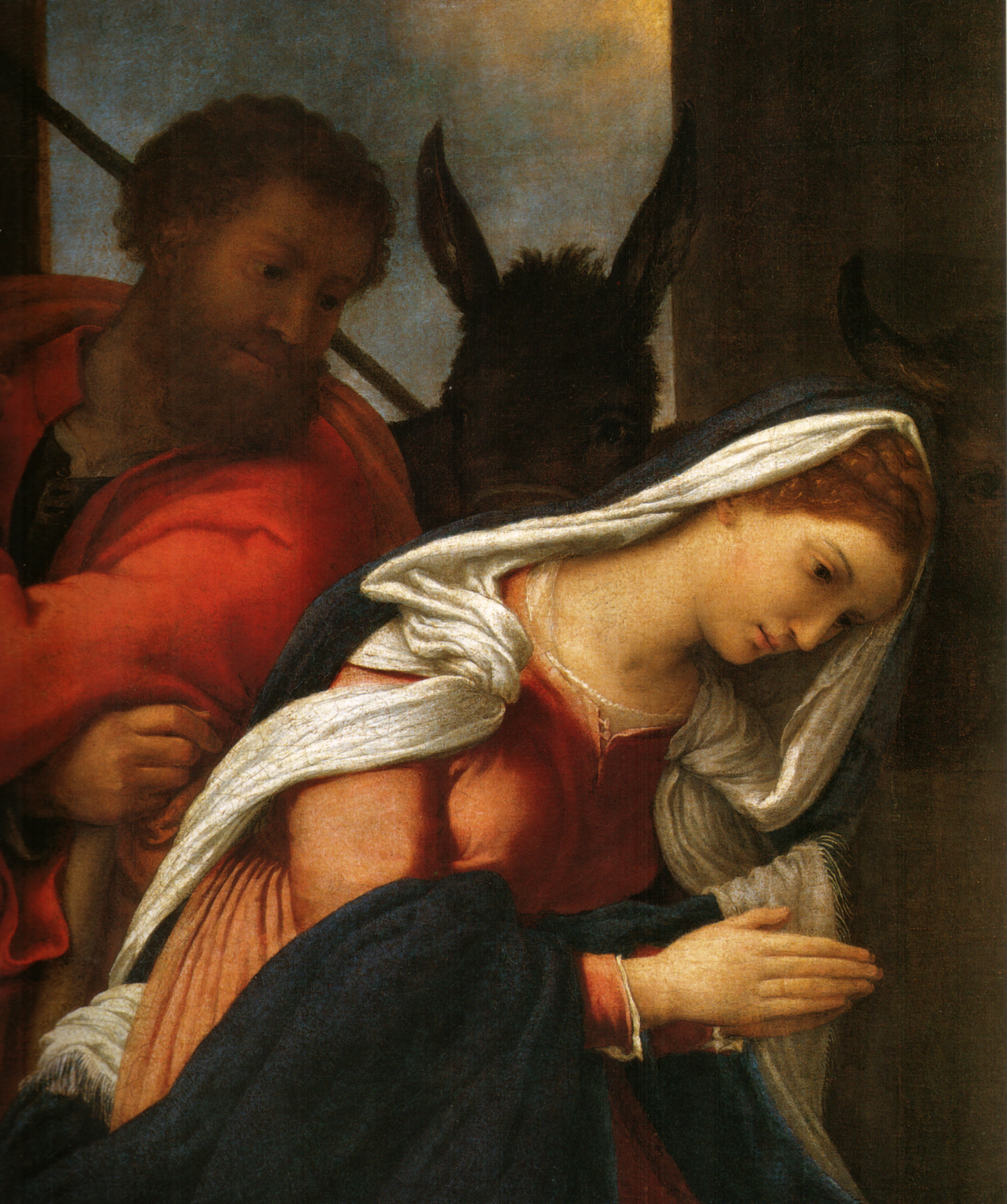
Detail

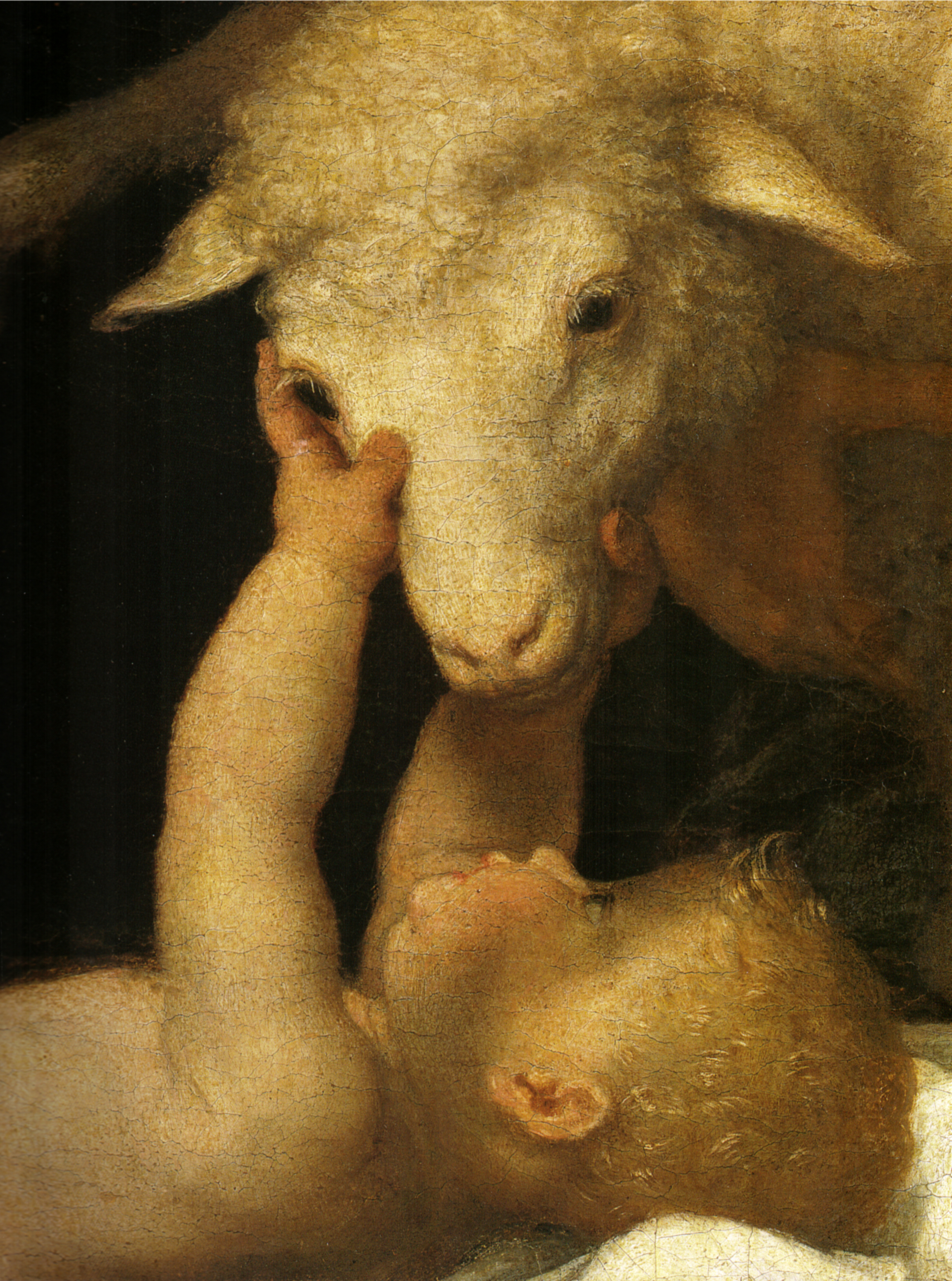
Detail

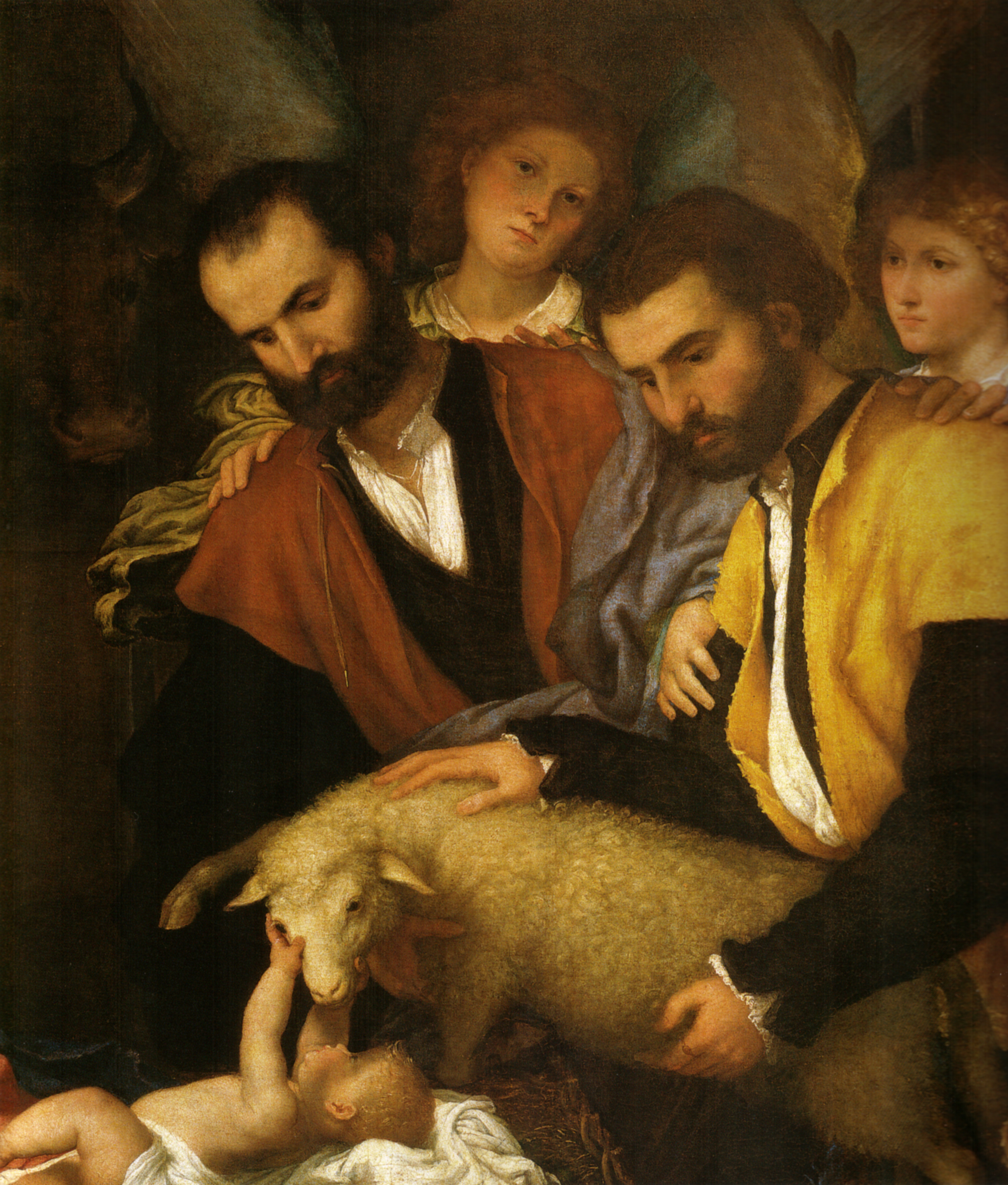
Detail
