= Santi Nazaro e Celso, Brescia =

Church in Brescia, Lombardy, Italy

Coordinates: 45.537005°N 10.213125°E

Santi Nazaro e Celso
- Pediment with Christ and six statues of saints

Religion
- Affiliation: Roman Catholic
- Province: Brescia

Location
- Location: Brescia, Italy
- Interactive map of Santi Nazaro e Celso

Architecture
- Type: Neoclassic Facade
- Groundbreaking: 13th century
- Completed: 1780

Santi Nazaro e Celso is a church located on Corso Giacomo Matteotti, at the intersection with via Fratelli Bronzetti, in Brescia, Lombardy, Italy. The church contains the Averoldi Polyptych (1522), a masterwork of Titian.

== History ==
Originally a church was found at approximately the same site in 1222, in an area that was soon enclosed by enlarged city walls. A major reconstruction began in 1746, by designs of abate Zinelli, and completed in 1781, leading to the statue-topped neoclassical facade we see today. It was interrupted in 1769 by an accidental explosion of a powder magazine at nearby Porta Nazaro. The reconstruction was finally completed, and worship resumed in 1780. Seventeen years later, the college of canons was suppressed, but the church remained functioning as a parish church. The organ in the church was completed by Luigi Amati in 1803.

The entrance has a bust of one of the patrons of the reconstruction, the bishop of Modone, Alessandro Fe.

== Interior ==
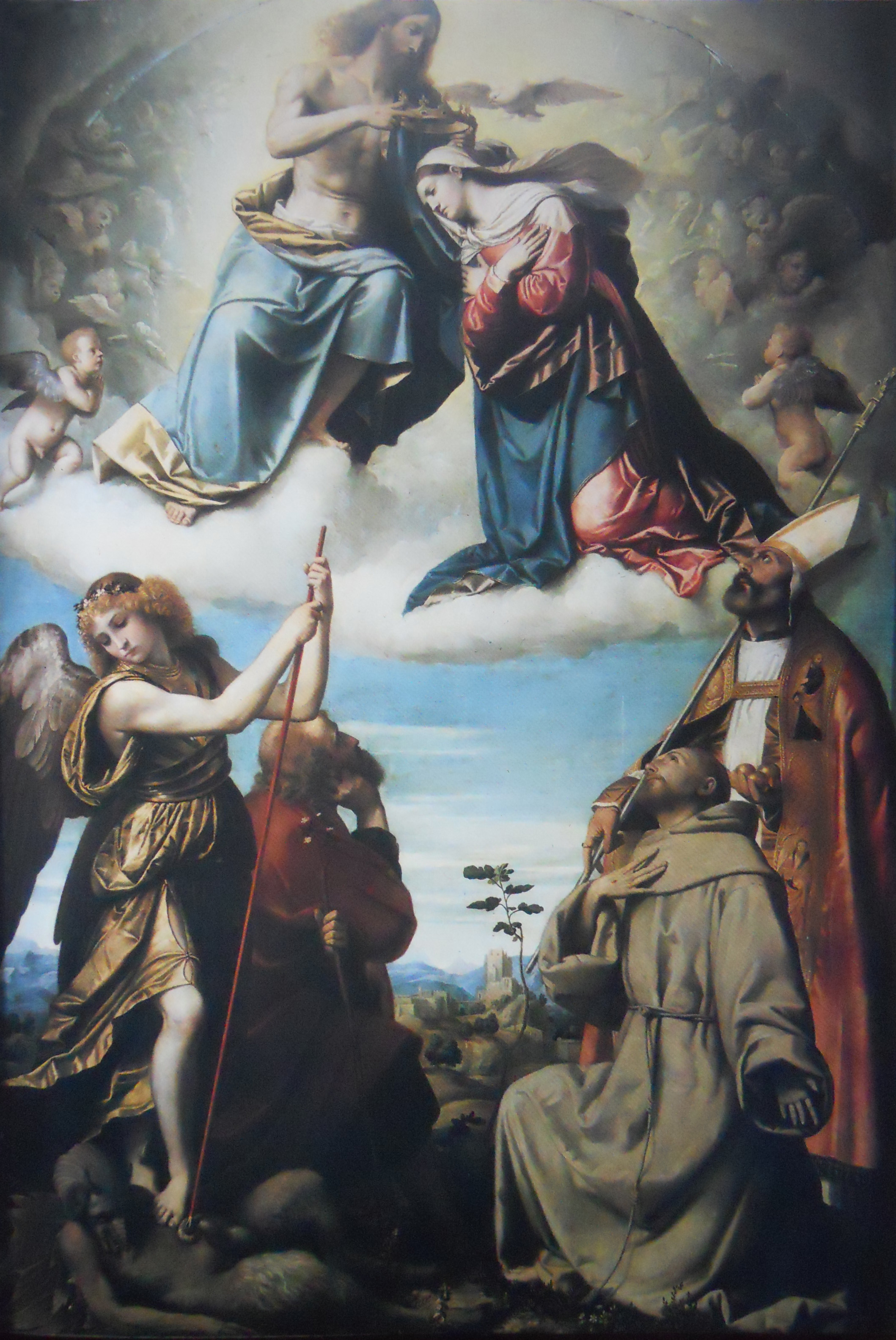
Moretto, Coronation of the Virgin with Saints Michael Archangel, Joseph, Francis of Assisi, and Nicola of Bari

In addition to the polyptych, the church contains the following artworks:

- Coronation of the Virgin with Saints (circa 1534) by il Moretto, 2nd altar to left.
- Passion of Christ with Moses and Solomon (or David) (1541-1542) by Moretto, 3rd altar to right.
- Annunciation by Gabriello Rottini, 3rd altar to left.
- Adoration of the Shepherds with Saints Nazarius and Celsus (circa 1540) by Moretto, 4th altar to left.
- Madonna and child with St. Laurence and Augustine (c. 1460–1480) by Paolo da Caylina the Elder.
- Polyptych of St Rocco (c. 1590) by Antonio Gandino.
- Adoration of the Magi (1740) by Giambattista Pittoni.
- Death of St. Joseph (1738) by Francesco Polazzo.
- St Barbara and donor (1588) by Lattanzio Gambara.
