= Vision of a Knight (Raphael) =

Painting by Raphael

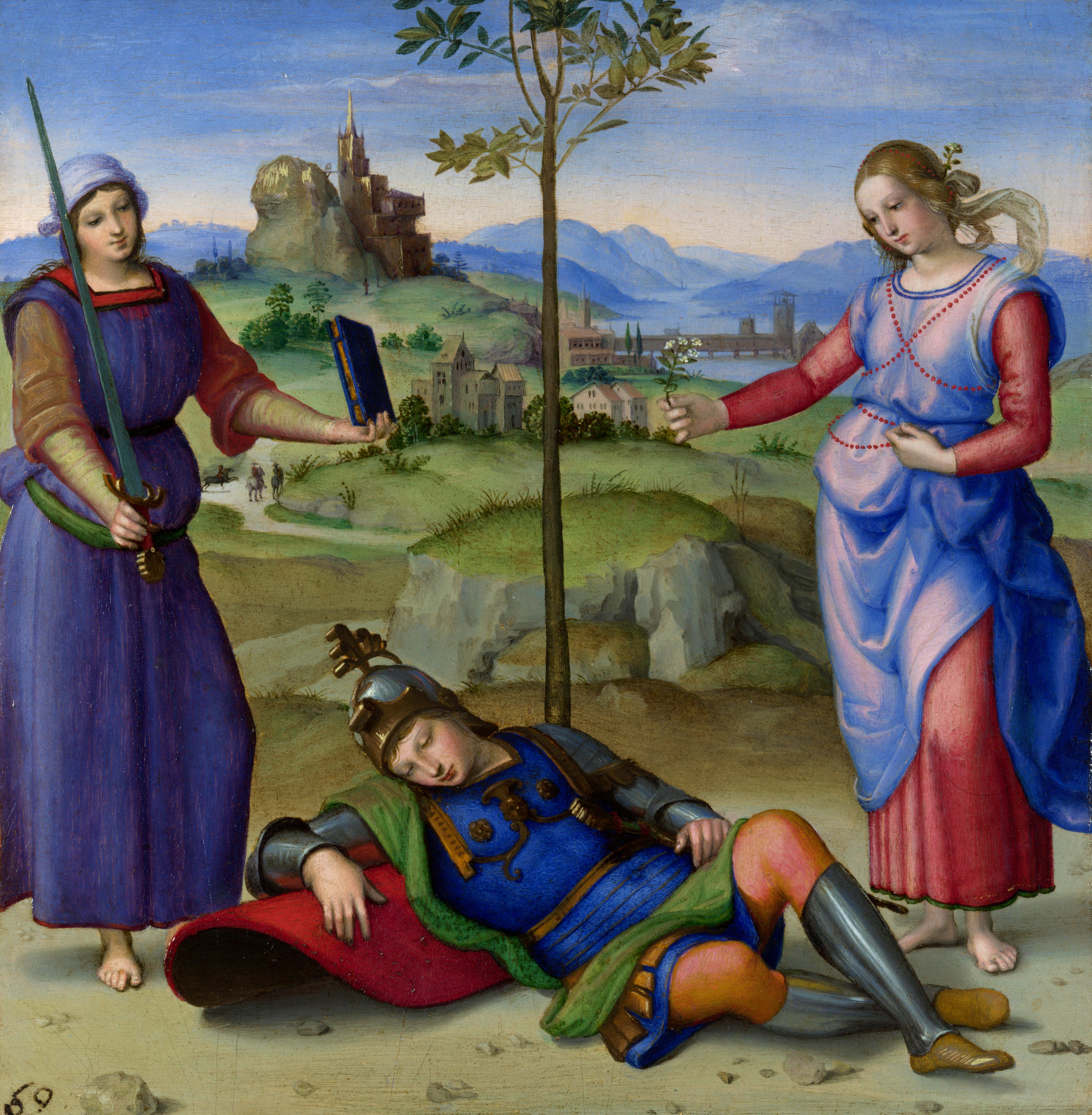
- Artist: Raphael
- Year: 1503–1504
- Type: Egg tempera on poplar
- Dimensions: 17.1 cm × 17.1 cm (6.7 in × 6.7 in)
- Location: National Gallery, London

The Vision of a Knight, also called The Dream of Scipio or Allegory, is a small egg tempera painting on poplar by the Italian Renaissance artist Raphael, finished in 1503–1504. It is in the National Gallery in London. It probably formed a pair with the Three Graces panel, also 17 cm square, now in the Musée Condé.

There are a number of theories as to what the panel is intended to represent. Some art historians think the sleeping knight represents the Roman general Scipio Aemilianus (185–129 BC) who, according to Cicero's Somnium Scipionis, dreamed that he had to choose between Virtue (behind whom is a steep and rocky path) and Pleasure (in looser robes).

"This sleepy Lancelot also conjures up memories of another ancient hero: the Roman general Publius Cornelius Scipio Africanus Aemilianus, who toured the cosmos in a dream and learned (at least according to Cicero) that the reward of virtue is a place among the stars in heaven."

However, the two feminine figures are not presented as contestants. They may represent the ideal attributes of the knight: the book, sword, and flower that they hold suggest the ideals of scholar, soldier and lover which a knight should combine.

The most likely source for the allegory depicted is a passage in the Punica, an epic poem recounting the Second Punic War by the Latin poet Silius Italicus.

The panel was moved to England by William Young Ottley in 1800.

Raphael used an extensive palette of paints to depict this colourful scene. Pigments such as lead-tin yellow, ultramarine, verdigris and ochres have been identified in a pigment analysis at ColourLex.

== See also ==
- List of paintings by Raphael
