= Brescia explosion =

Disaster in Italy in 1769

Coordinates: 45.537005°N 10.213125°E

The Brescia explosion occurred in 1769 in Brescia (now part of Italy) when a large store of gunpowder exploded after a lightning strike, causing extensive destruction and many deaths. Claims that as many as 6,000 people died in the explosion (which may be an exaggeration) place the event high on lists of accidents and disasters by death toll.

== Explosion ==
On August 18, 1769, the city of Brescia in northern Italy was devastated when the Bastion of San Nazaro was struck by lightning. The resulting fire ignited about 90,000 kg (or about 200,000 lb) of gunpowder stored there by the Republic of Venice, causing a massive explosion. Huge stones were hurled in a radius of a kilometer around the explosion, landing on people, houses and church buildings including Santi Nazaro e Celso. Doors of houses and shops and city gates were thrown open and broken glass showered down.

This explosion destroyed about one-sixth of the city. Reports of death tolls vary, with 3,000 deaths often reported in later English sources, though an official account from two years after the event references 400 dead and 800 wounded. French writer Louis-Sébastien Mercier claimed in his popular 1770 novel L'An 2440, rêve s'il en fut jamais, which was translated into English as Memoirs of the year two thousand five hundred that by 1772, 2,500 died in the explosion.

Scipione Garbelli's Le Rovine di Brescia ("The ruins of Brescia") was published in 1771 and documented the tragedy.

== Reactions ==
Britain reacted to the tragedy by passing laws governing the private manufacture and storage of gunpowder. In determining how to protect the British government stores, Benjamin Franklin advised the use of pointed "lightning rods" and prevailed in a debate over whether pointed rods or blunt rods should be used.

The memory of the tragedy long remained with the people of the city. The fire and noise caused by the fall of a meteorite in nearby Alfianello in 1883 are said to have immediately caused recall of the long ago explosion.
