= Christ Blessing (Raphael) =

Painting by Raphael

Christ Blessing (Cristo benedicente)
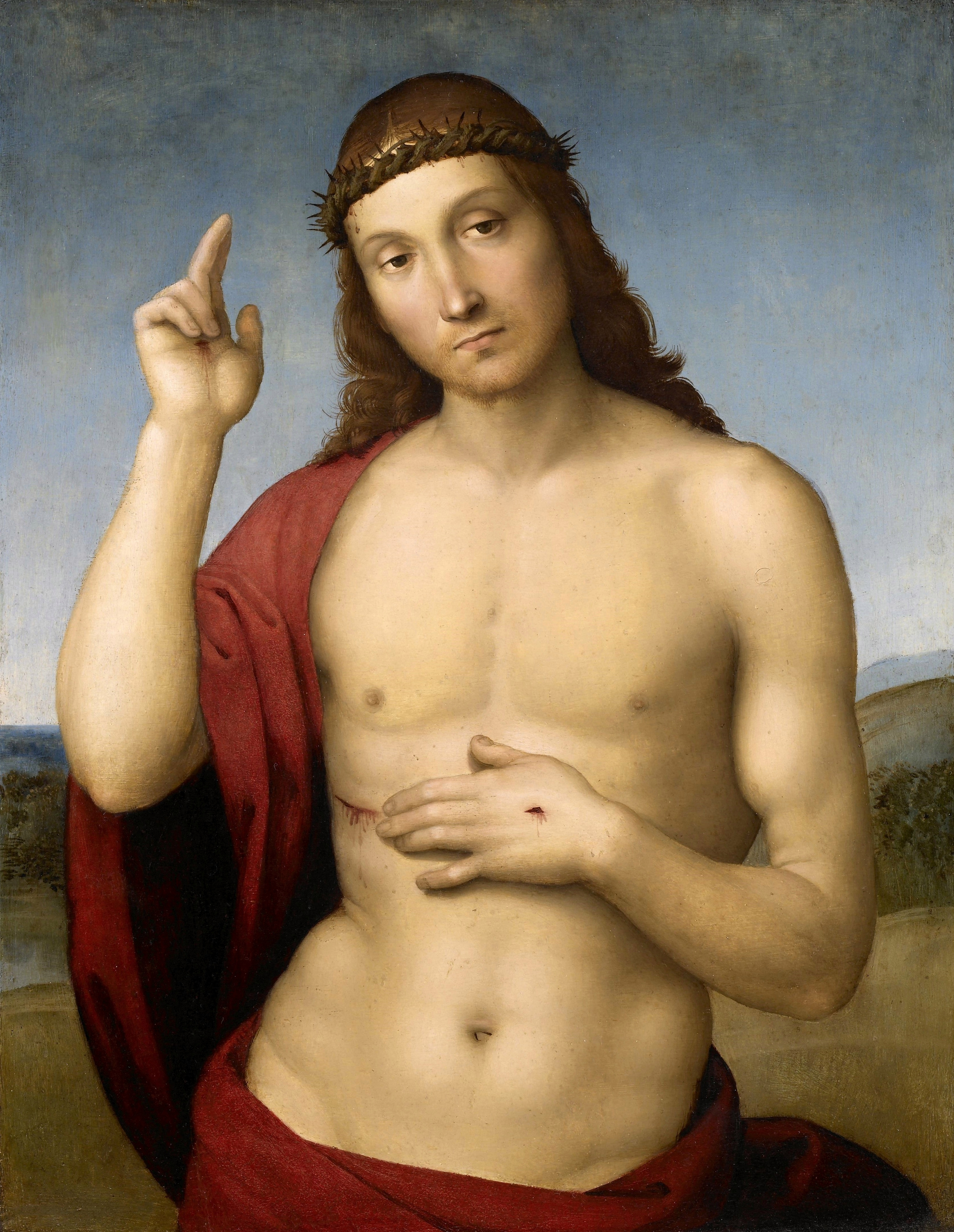
- Artist: Raphael
- Year: c. 1500-1504
- Medium: Oil on wood
- Dimensions: 30 cm × 25 cm (12 in × 9.8 in)
- Location: Pinacoteca Tosio Martinengo, Brescia, Italy

Christ Blessing (Italian title: Cristo benedicente) is an oil on wood painting by the Italian Renaissance artist Raphael, executed c. 1500–1504. Since 1851, it is located in the Pinacoteca Tosio Martinengo, Brescia, Italy.

The features of Christ bear some resemblance to a self-portrait of Raphael's.

== See also ==
- List of paintings by Raphael
- Italian Renaissance painting
- 1505 in art § Works
