= Scenes from Tebaldeo's Eclogues =

Four paintings by Andrea Previtali

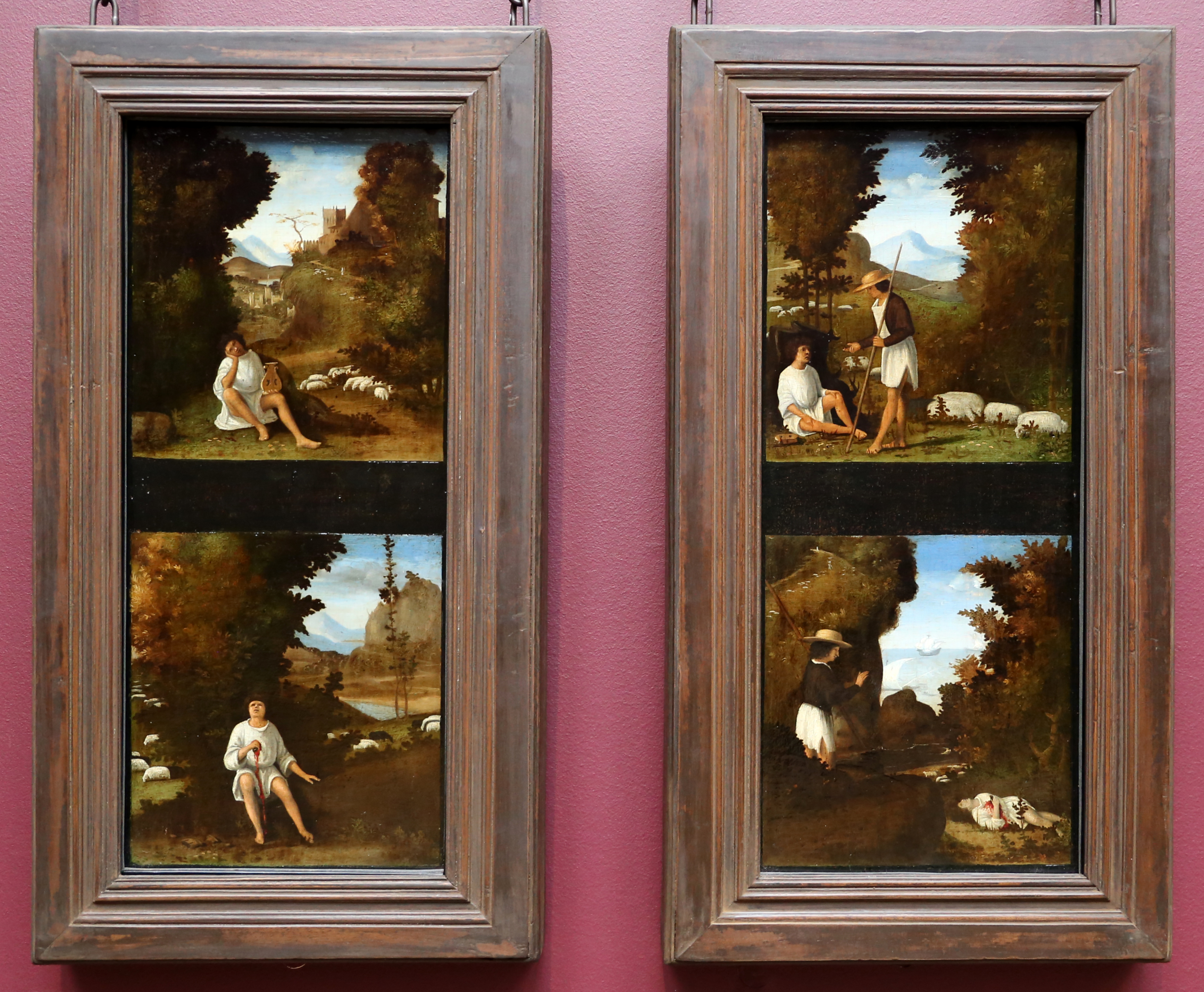
Scenes from Tebaldeo's Eclogues

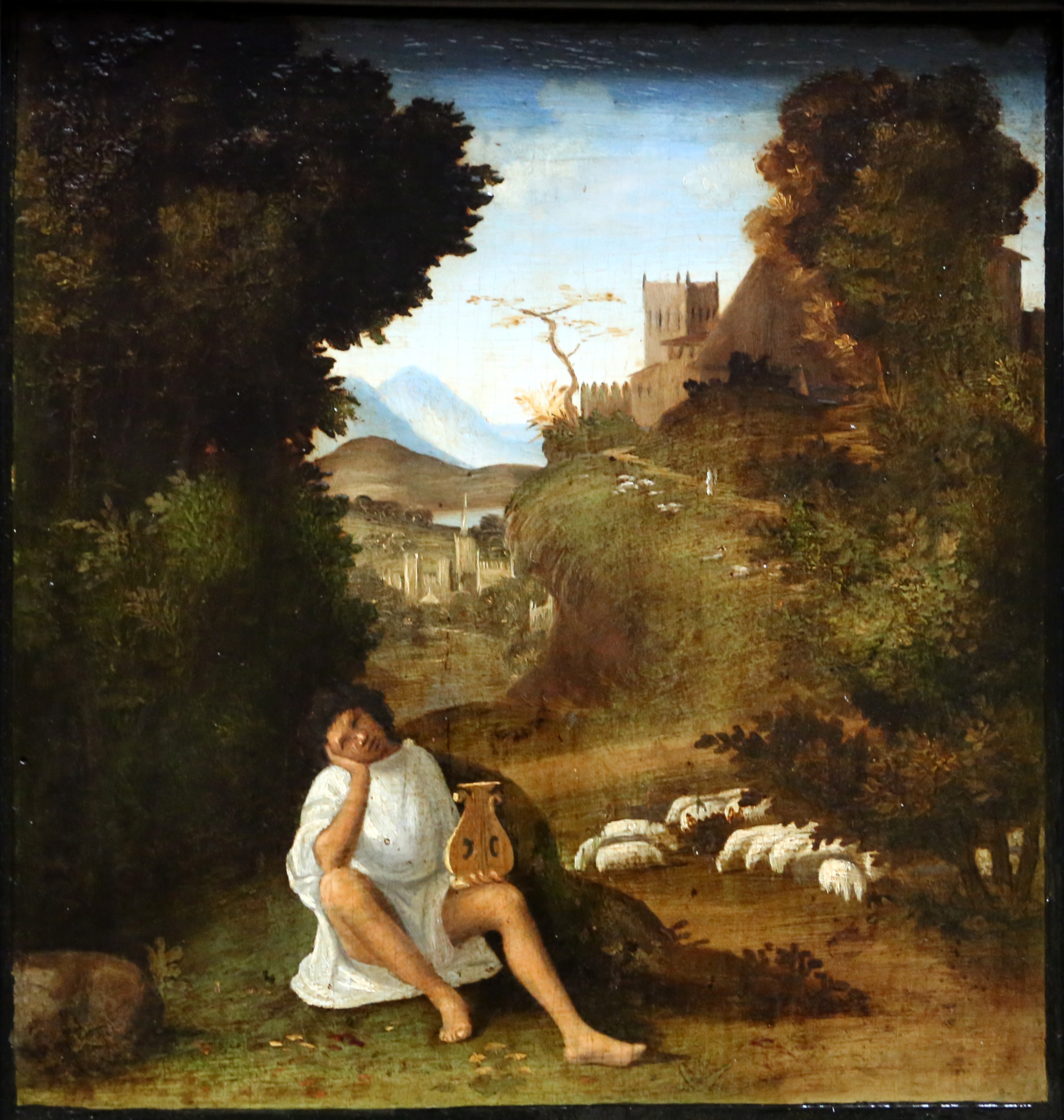
Scene 1 - Damon Brooding

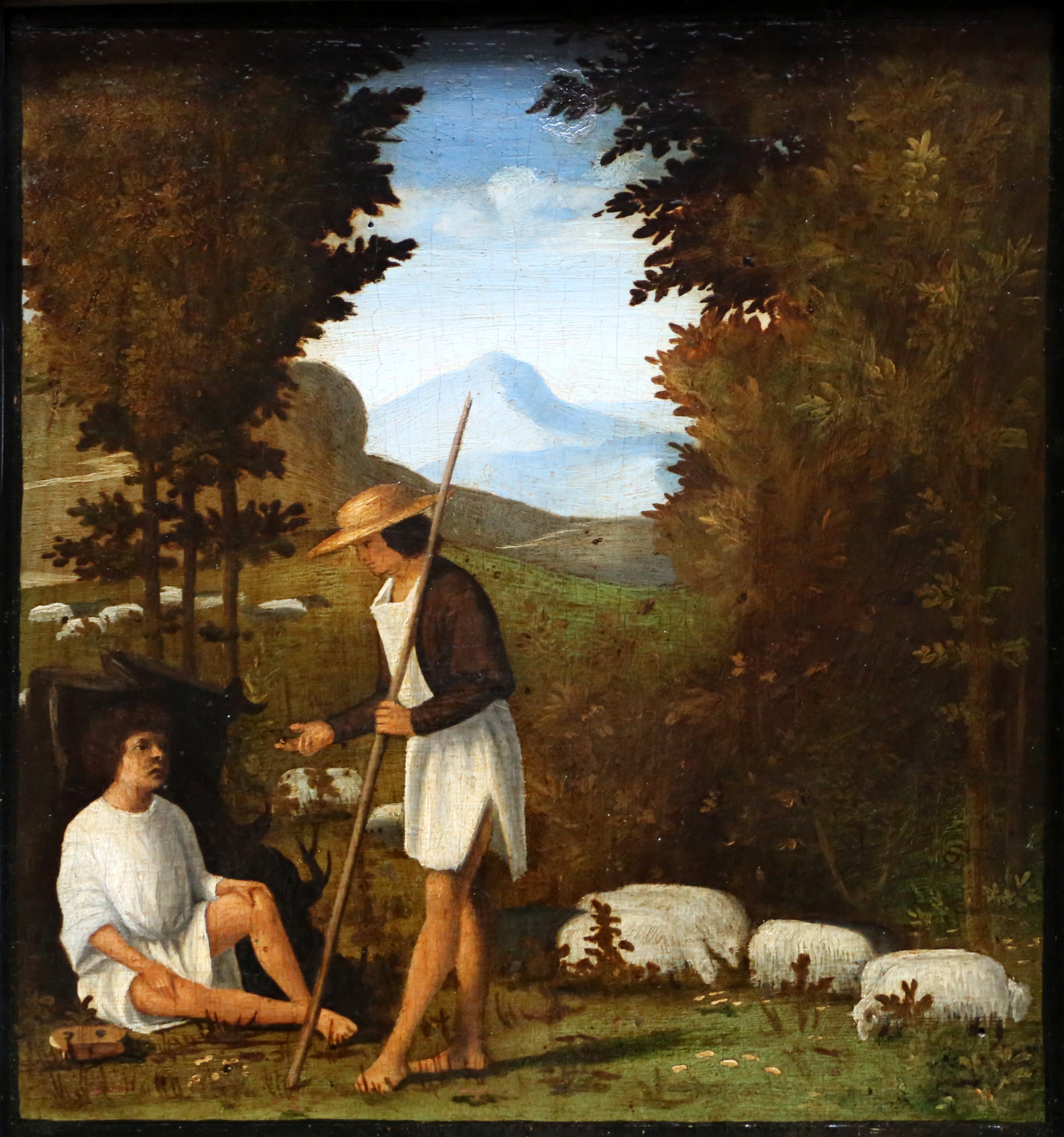
Scene 2 - Thyrsis asking Damon the Reason for his Suffering

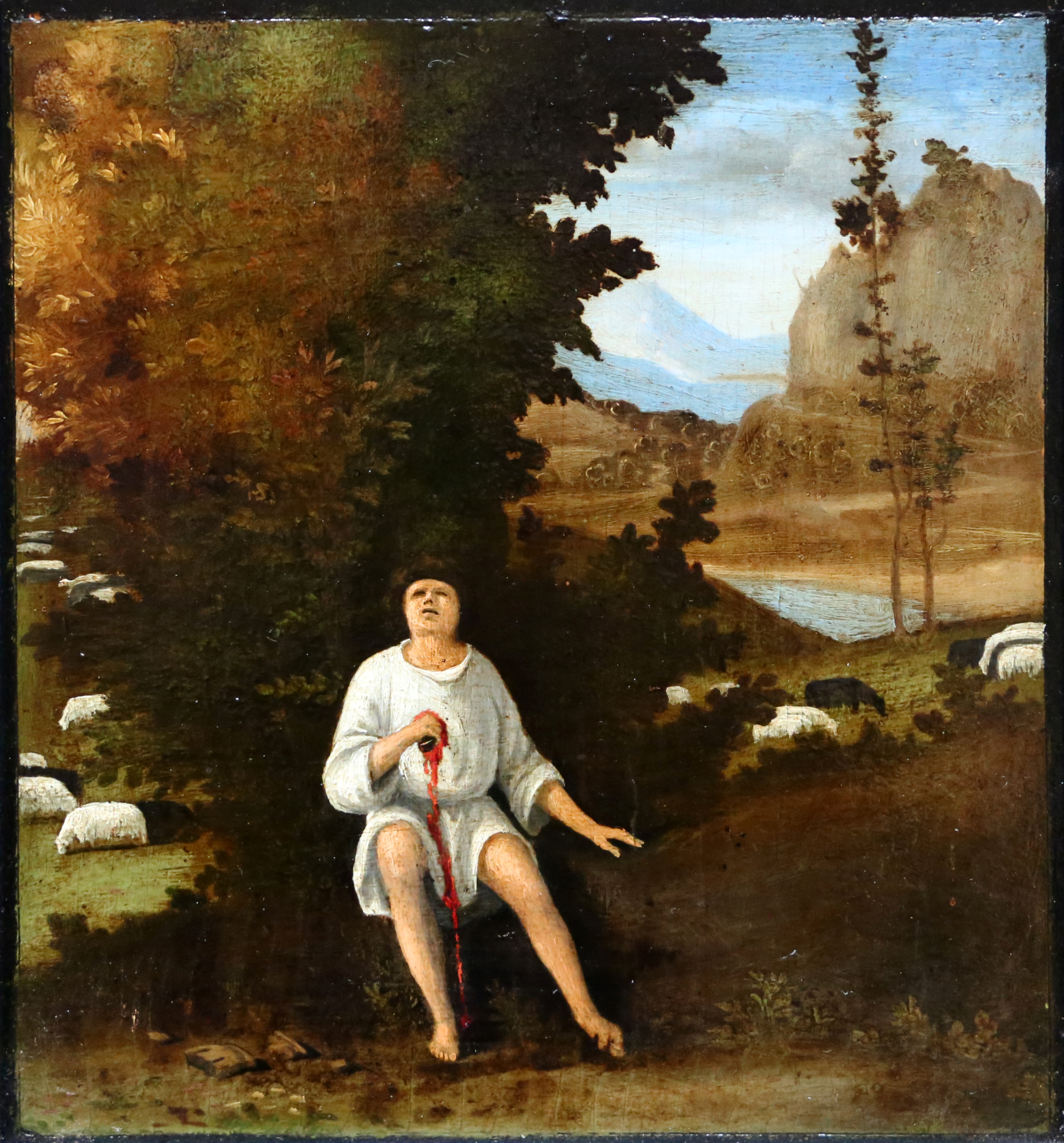
Scene 3 - Death of Damon

Scenes from Tebaldeo's Eclogues is a set of four small square oil on panel paintings by Andrea Previtali, executed between 1505 and 1510, now in the National Gallery, London. They show scenes from the Ferrarese writer Antonio Tebaldeo's eclogue on the life of Damon of Athens, featuring his friend Thyrsis and Damon's love for Amaryllis. They were probably originally part of a piece of furniture for a rich Venetian noble family. Previtali's master Giovanni Bellini also produced furniture with scenes from the same book.

Whilst still misattributed to Giorgione due to their pastoral content and style, they were acquired for their present owner in 1938 by its director Kenneth Clark at a high price, leading to the 'Giorgione Controversy'. However, comparison with the background landscape in Madonna and Child (Detroit Institute of Arts), an undated work signed by Previtali, confirmed that the four London works were in fact also by Previtali.

Previtali's painting is a compilation of works and subjects from the best artists of his time; having worked in Bellini's workshop at a young age allowed him to become familiar with the works of the artists who lived in and visited the lagoon city, including Albrecht Dürer. Two of Previtali's panels were exhibited in the Royal Palace of Milan in the exhibition dedicated to the German artist in 2018.

== Description ==
The four panels depict the encounter between the shepherd Thyrsis and the unhappy Damon, suffering from unrequited love for Amarilli, and reflect the art of Giorgione, who was able to recreate the poetry of 15th-century poets, as did his followers, by depicting scenes set in ideal, unspoiled landscapes inhabited by shepherds who embody poetry.

The first tablet depicts Danone with a lyre resting on his left leg, sitting, dreaming, truly melancholic. Beside him, a flock of sheep indicates the presence of their shepherd. The setting is that of the idyllic landscapes described in the works of Virgil and Theocritus, a "locus amoenus" composed of trees and hills near a castle tower, while in the distance an anonymous walled city lies in the valley, beyond the blue of the mountains and a clear sky, where a single white cloud only enhances the serenity of that time.

The second tablet depicts the young man's encounter with the shepherd Thyrsis, who wants to know the reason for his sadness. The shepherd appears with his sheep, while in the background, the landscape has lost that touch of humanity that the city towers once provided. In the third panel, Danone, left alone, kills himself by stabbing himself in the heart with a knife. Damone sits in the shadows while the warm colors of the autumnal landscape beyond him do not envelop him. Previtali softens the dramatic nature of the moment with the warm colors of a lyrical landscape; the pain that arises from love does not have the color of anger, and the artist has managed to give humanity to a gesture that represents the absolute lack of human understanding.

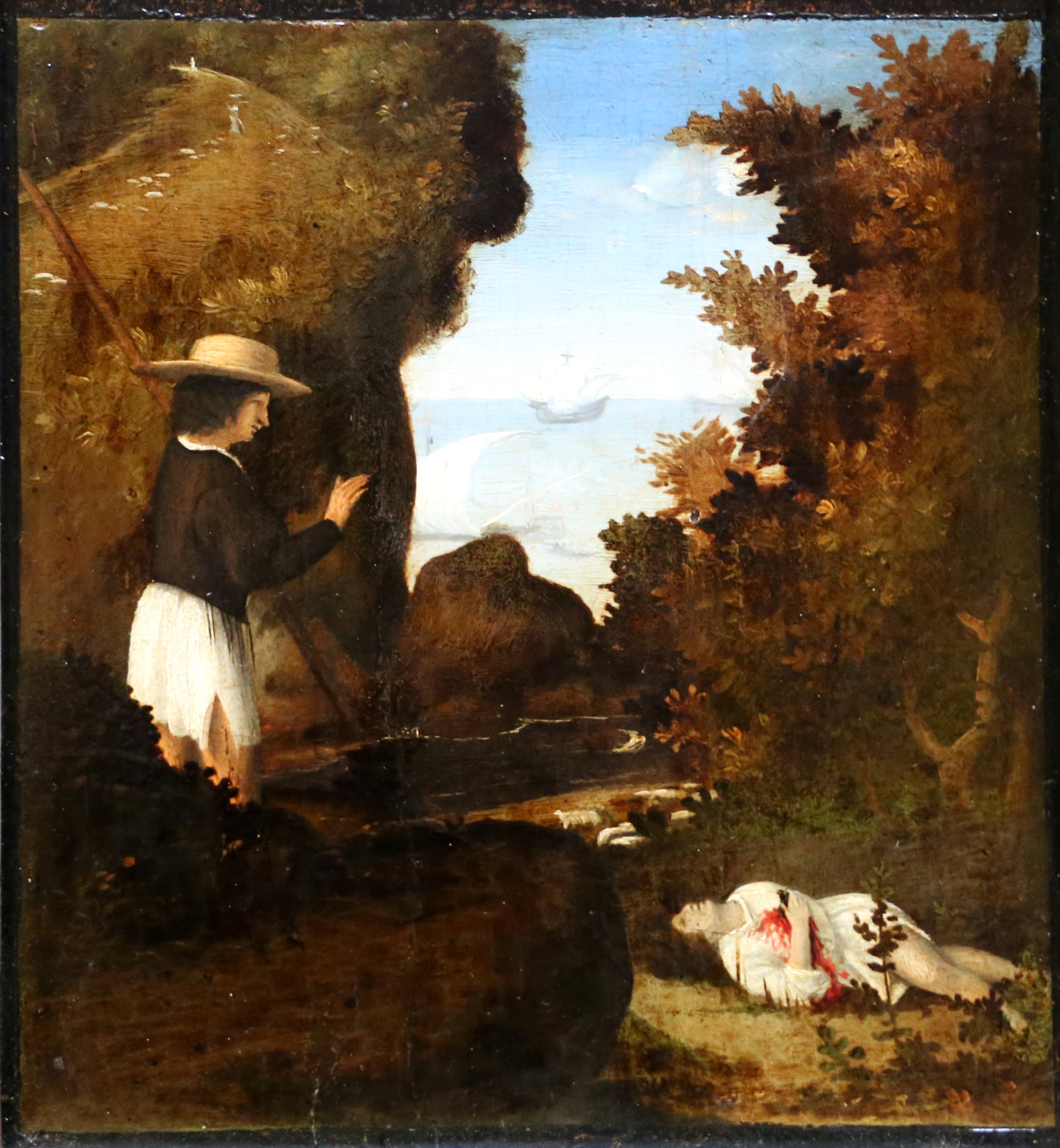
Scene 4 - Tirsi finds Damon's body

Thus the fourth panel, which invites reflection. Damon lies lifeless, beside him the sheep continue to graze, unaware that the grass is stained with blood; life goes on. Next to him, Thyrsis, the shepherd with torn clothes, looks at him, seemingly wanting to say goodbye. Everything is serene, even the ships in the background, with their sails filled by the wind, represent a peaceful scene.

Previtali thus managed to reproduce a story without having to include explanatory captions, and by imbuing it with the right amount of melancholy that distances it from the dramatic nature of the moment. Nature, perhaps, is the main protagonist. It remains indifferent, imperturbable in the face of human history, because the history of the world continues always and in any case with its inexorable rhythm.
