= Three Graces (Raphael) =

Painting by Raphael

The Three Graces
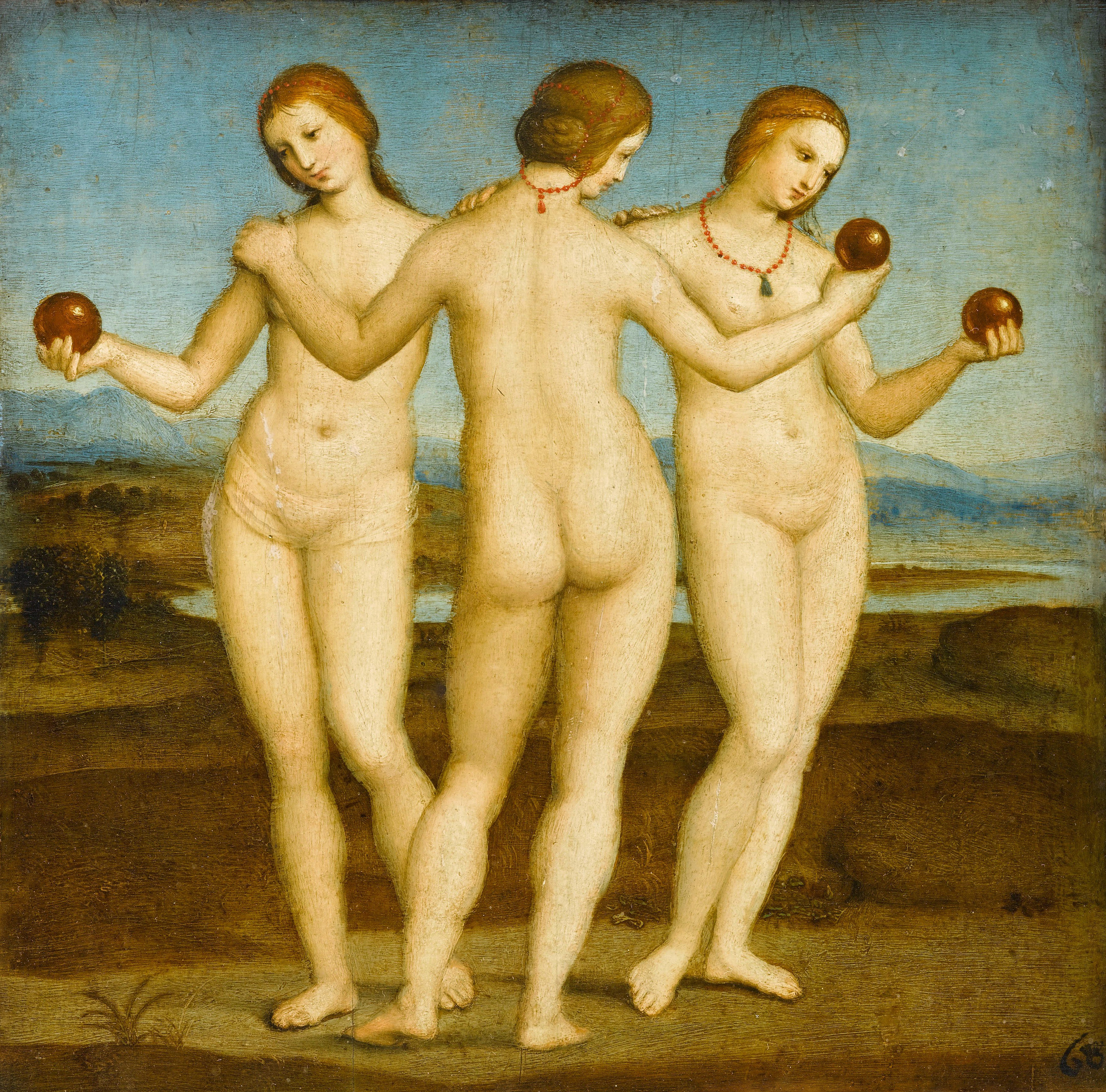
- Artist: Raphael
- Year: c. 1503-1505
- Medium: Oil on panel
- Dimensions: 17.1 cm × 17.1 cm (6.7 in × 6.7 in)
- Location: Musée Condé, Chantilly

The Three Graces is an oil painting by the Italian painter Raphael in the Musée Condé in Chantilly, France. The date of origin has not been positively determined, though it seems to have been painted at some point after his arrival to study with Pietro Perugino in about 1500, possibly 1503-1505. According to James Patrick in 2007's Renaissance and Reformation, the painting represents the first time that Raphael had depicted the nude female form in front and back views.

== Inspiration and theme ==
The image depicts three of the Graces of classical mythology. It is frequently asserted that Raphael was inspired in his painting by a ruined Roman marble statue displayed in the Piccolomini Library of the Siena Cathedral—19th-century art historian [Dan K] held that it was a not very skillful copy of that original—but other inspiration is possible, as the subject was a popular one in Italy. Julia Cartwright in Early Work of Raphael (2006) proposes that the painting bears far more influence of the school of Ferrara than classical sculpture, making clear that the statue was not Raphael's model.

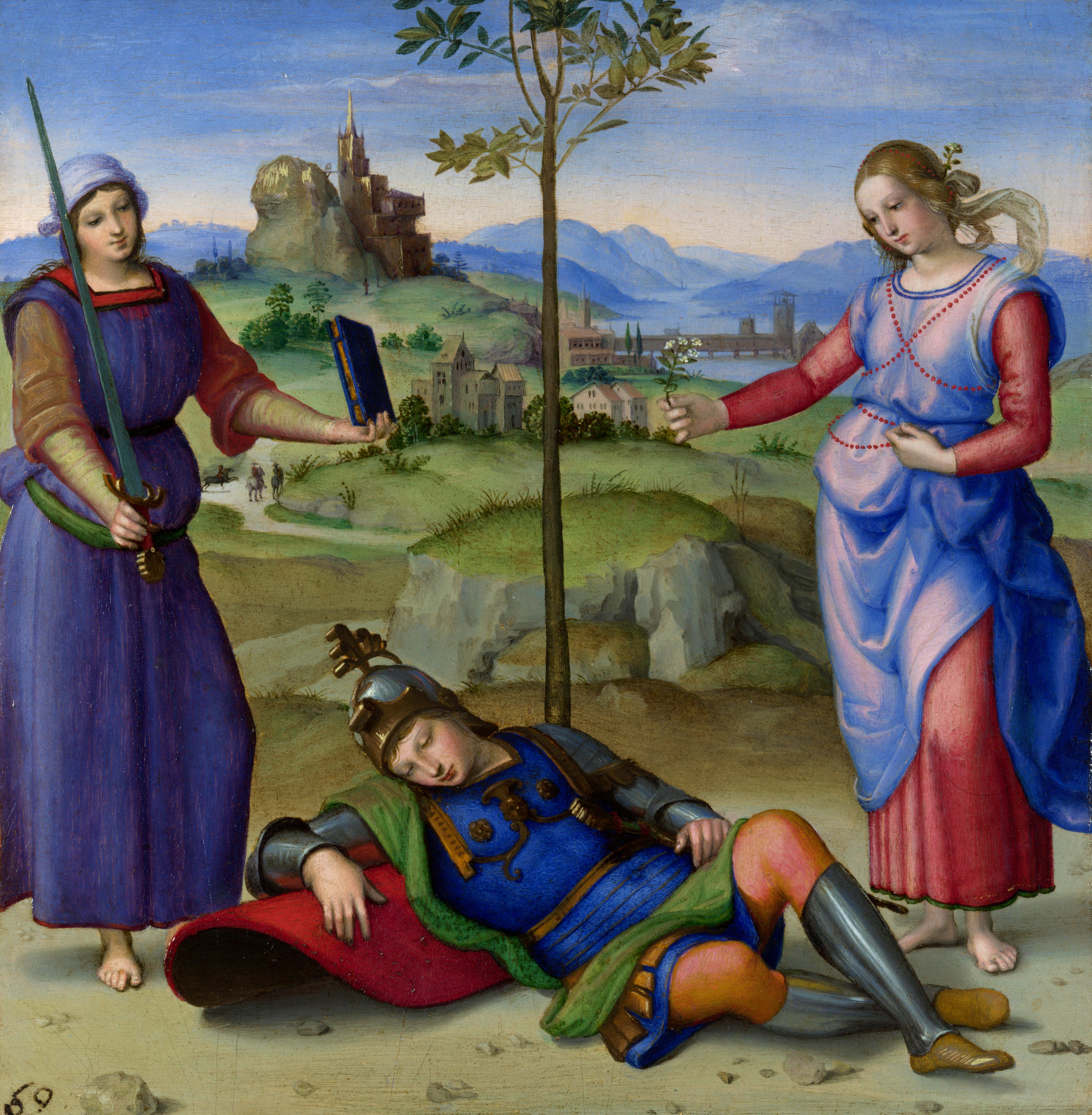
Vision of a Knight (1504–1505) Raphael

The three women in the painting may represent stages of development of woman, with the girded figure on the left representing the maiden (Chastitas) and the woman to the right maturity (Voluptas), though other interpretations have certainly been advanced.

In 1930, Professor Erwin Panofsky proposed that this painting was part of a diptych along with Vision of a Knight and that based on the theme of Vision the painting represented the Hesperides with the golden apples which Hercules stole. Some art historians disagree with Panofsky's conclusion. Roger Jones and Nicholas Penny, in 1987's biography Raphael, suggest that the scale differences of the figures in the paintings make it unlikely that they were intended as a diptych, though "one might have formed the lid of the other." In 16th Century Italian Art (2006), Michael Wayne Cole opines that while "there can be no doubt that they form a pair...they must not be imagined as a diptych, which is excluded by their square shape and also by the change in scale of the figures." Cole presents the figures as handmaidens of Venus, holding the golden apples with which she is associated and affirming the proper connection of "Virtus" (presented by Vision) and Amor.

== See also ==
- List of paintings by Raphael
