= St. Jerome at Prayer (Bosch) =

Painting by Hieronymus Bosch

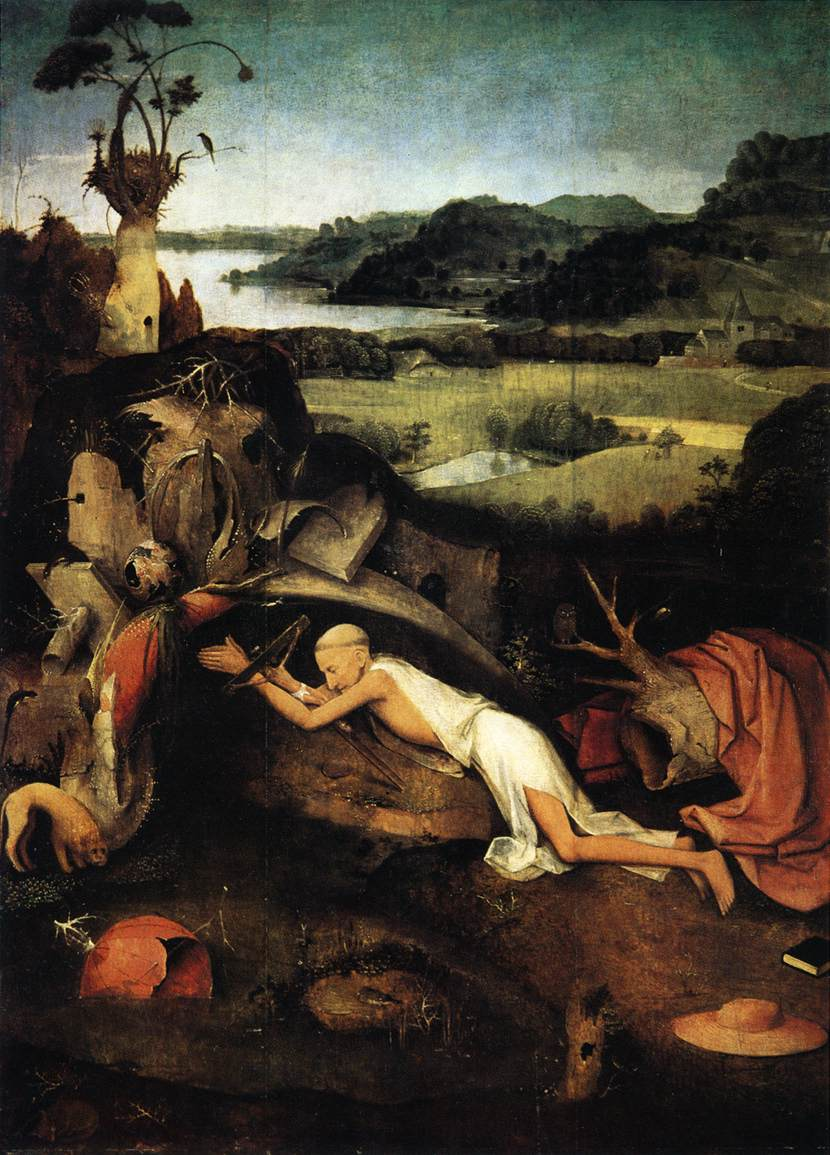
- Artist: Hieronymus Bosch
- Year: c. 1482
- Medium: Oil on panel
- Dimensions: 77 cm × 59 cm (30 in × 23 in)
- Location: Museum of Fine Arts, Ghent

St. Jerome at Prayer is a painting of St. Jerome by the Netherlandish artist Hieronymus Bosch, thought to have been completed c. 1482. Today it is housed at the Museum of Fine Arts in Ghent.

== History ==
The work is known only from its acquisition by the museum in 1908. As for most of Bosch's works, dating has been long disputed, dates having varied from 1490–1500 to 1495–1505. However, dendochronologic analysis has proved that it has been painted not after 1482.

== Description ==
St. Jerome was a frequent subject of 15th-century European art, depicted in his studio or during his penitence in the desert. Bosch for this picture adopted the latter iconography, although his saint is prone instead of kneeling. He is praying with a crucifix in his arms, also an unusual gesture of communion with Christ.

Jerome lies on a rock located under a kind of shell-like cave. He is surrounded by his traditional symbols (the lion – although in this case it has a smaller size than usual – the galero, the Bible), but Bosch, as common in his works, also added some bizarre elements, such as the bony pig or the spherical shell emerging from the pool. This could symbolize the world floating towards decay.

An owl and little owl are depicted on a branch: they allude, respectively, to heresy and the struggle against heresy. The Ten Commandments tables can be seen above the cave. The landscape is wide, in green tones.

== See also ==
- List of paintings by Hieronymus Bosch
- The Tricks of Leonardo da Vinci & Hieronymus Bosch. Xavier d'Hérouville & Aurore Caulier. December 2023. HAL Open Science

== Sources ==
- Varallo, Franca (2004). Bosch. Milan: Skira.
