= Holy Family and Donors (Carpaccio) =

Painting by Vittore Carpaccio

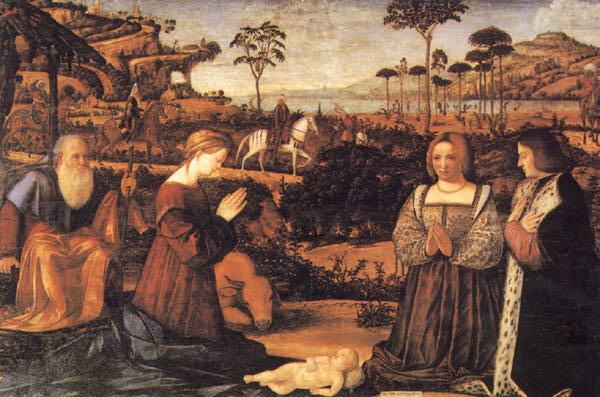
- Artist: Vittore Carpaccio(1465–1520)
- Year: 1505
- Type: tempera and (?) oil on panel
- Dimensions: 141 cm × 285 cm (56 in × 112 in)
- Location: Museu Calouste Gulbenkian; Lisbon

Holy Family and Donors is a painting by the Italian Renaissance artist Vittore Carpaccio. It is now in the Museu Calouste Gulbenkian, in Lisbon, Portugal.

The work shows the Holy Family on the left, and two donors in rich clothes on the right, all adoring the Christ Child in the centre. In the background is a fanciful landscape with the Magi riding towards the main scene.

Before it was purchased by Calouste Gulbenkian in 1924 it was formerly in the collection of the Barons Berwick at Attingham Park.
