= Pinacoteca Tosio Martinengo =

Art museum in Brescia, Italy

Coordinates: 45°32′5″N 10°13′34″E

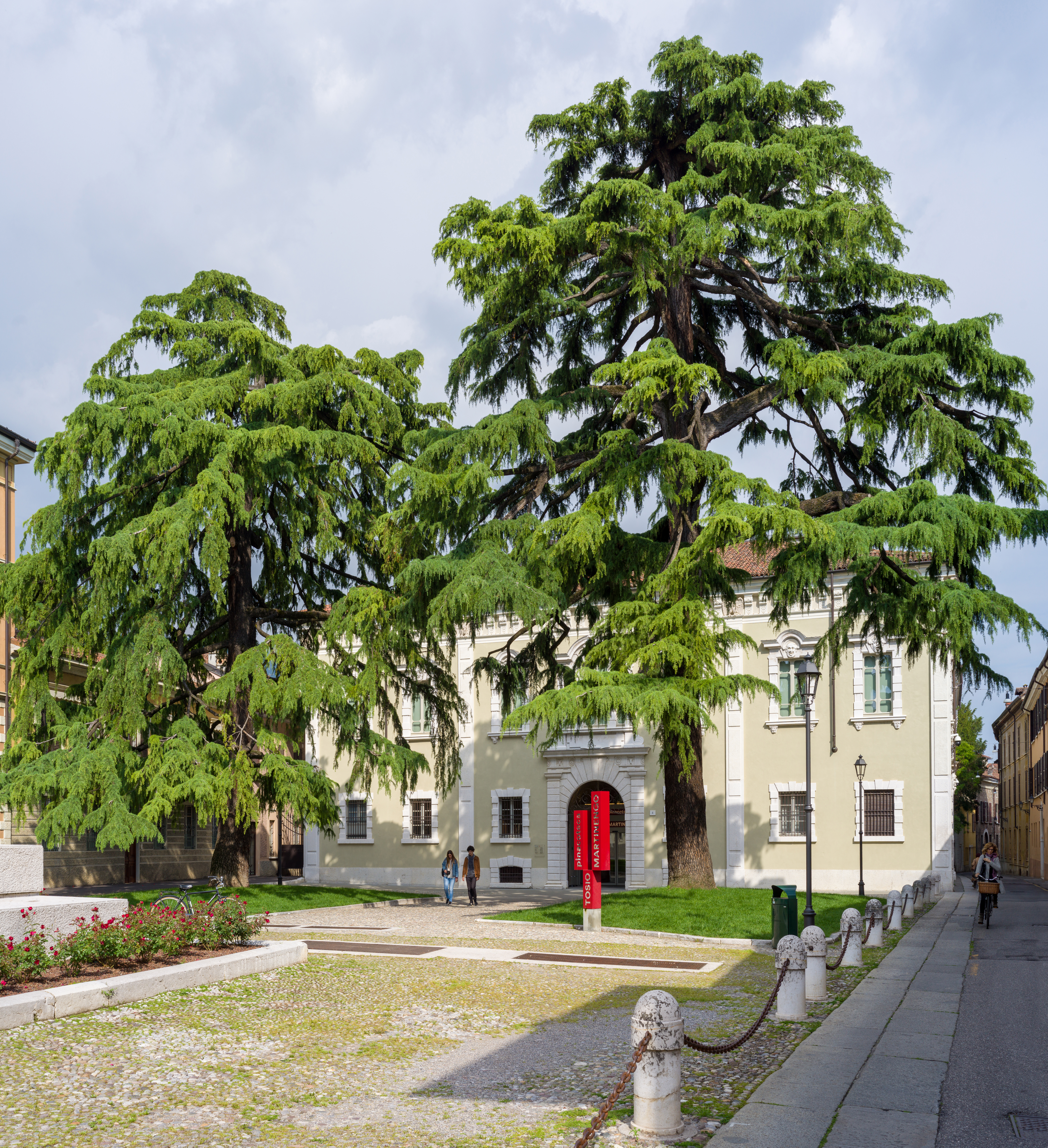
- Established: 1851
- Location: Piazza Moretto 1, 25121 Brescia – Italy
- Director: Stefano Karadjov
- Website: www.bresciamusei.com/musei-e-luoghi/pinacoteca-tosio-martinengo

The Pinacoteca Tosio Martinengo is a public art museum in Brescia, Lombardy, Italy.

Established in 1851, the museum exhibits mainly paintings by local artists dated from the Thirteenth through the Eighteenth century. The museum's current collection includes over 800 works of painting and sculpture, displayed in 21 galleries.

The museum reopened on 17 March 2018 after a major nine-year-long renovation project.

== History ==
The gallery opened in 1851 in the central Palazzo Tosio, endowed in 1832 with the collection of Count Paolo Tosio and further enriched by donations and gathering of items from local religious buildings.

In 1884, the Count Leopardo Martinengo da Barco added to the painting collection and endowed a library and collections of scientific artifacts to display in his palace.

== Museum ==
The current collection of the museum includes works by Vincenzo Foppa, Ferramola, Paolo Veneziano, Andrea Solari, Francesco Francia, Lorenzo Lotto, Luca Mombello and Lattanzio Gambara.

== Collection highlights ==
=== Paintings ===
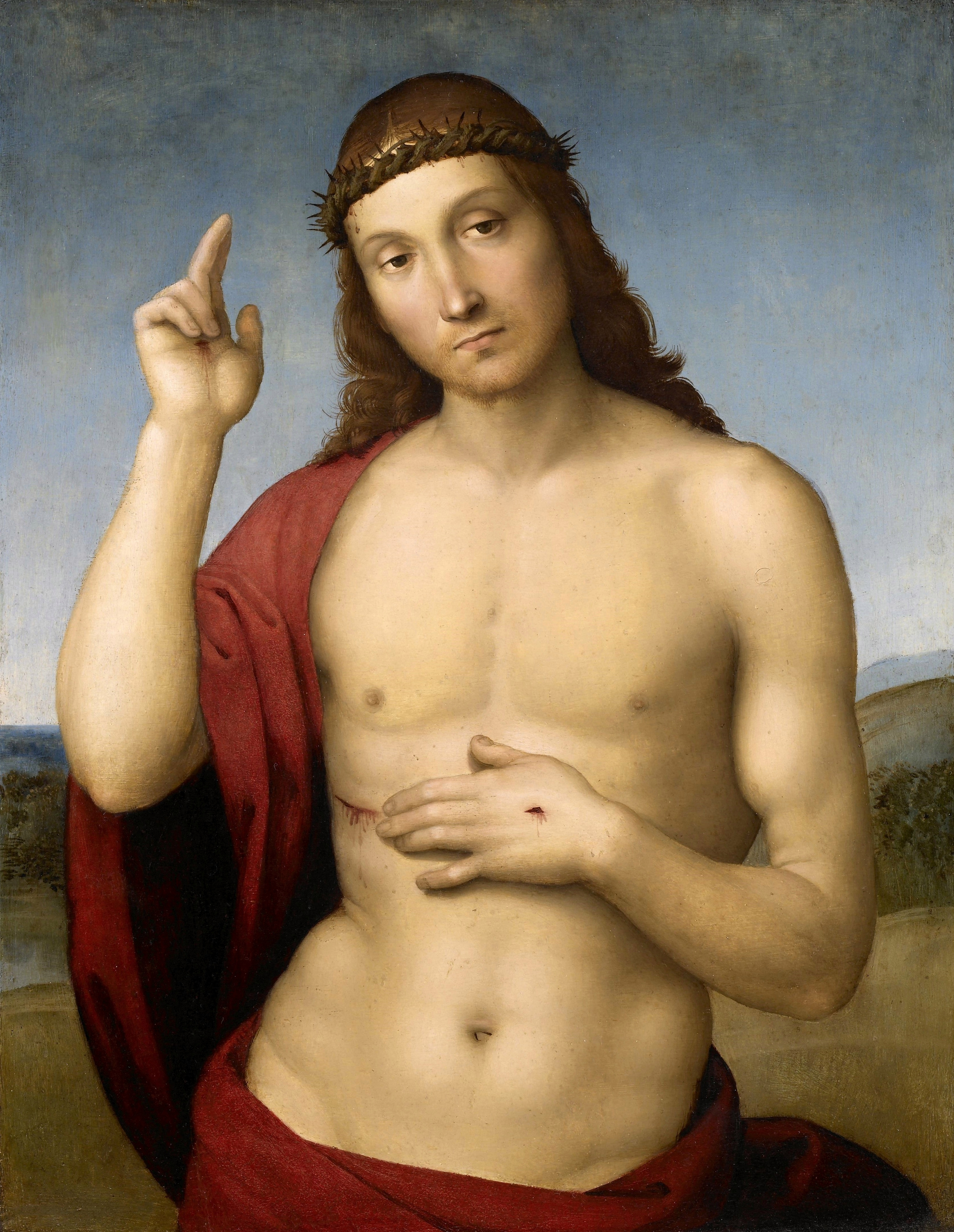
Christ Blessing (Pax Vobiscum) by Raphael. c. 1505

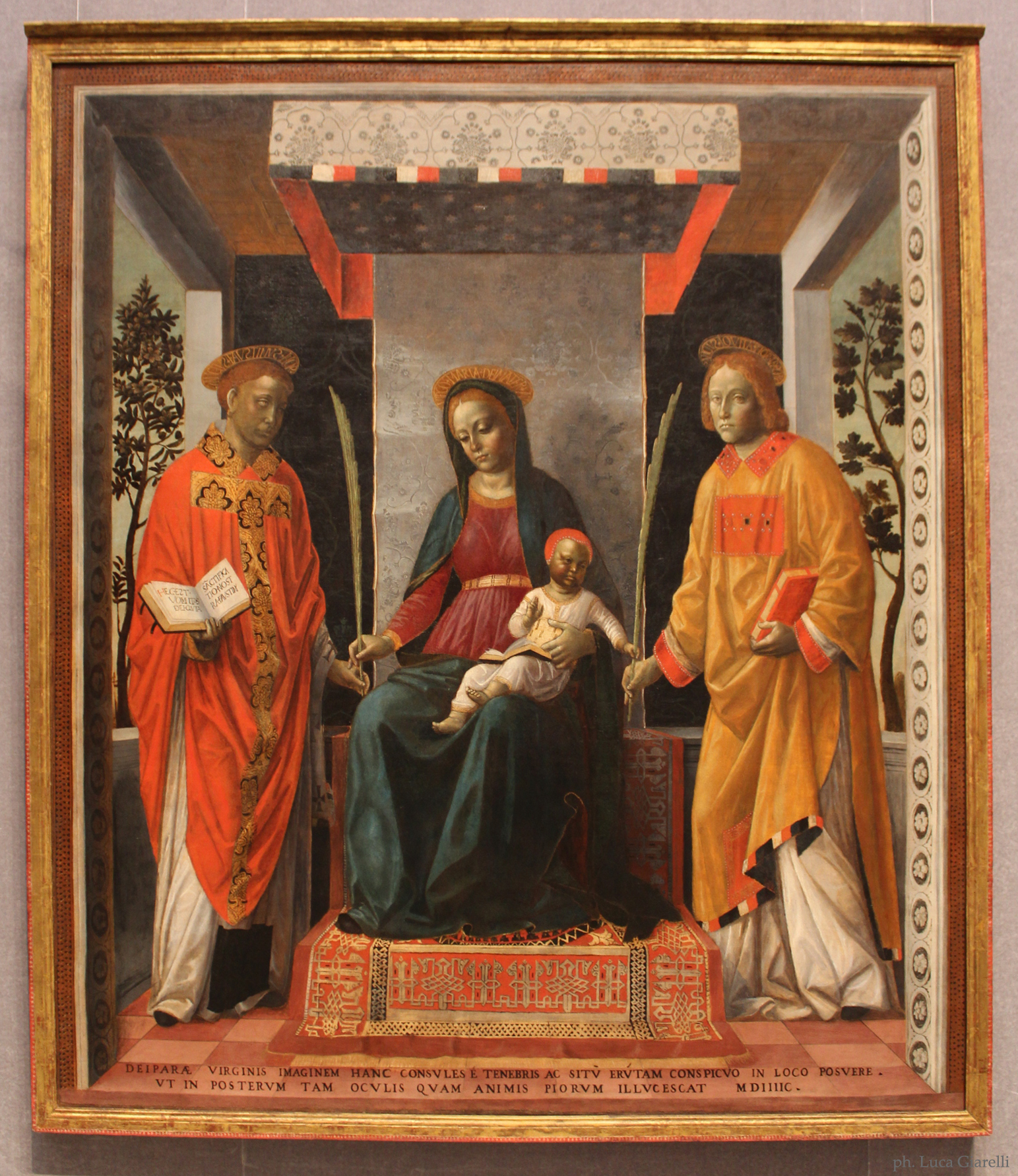
Pala della Mercanzia by Vincenzo Foppa. c. 1490

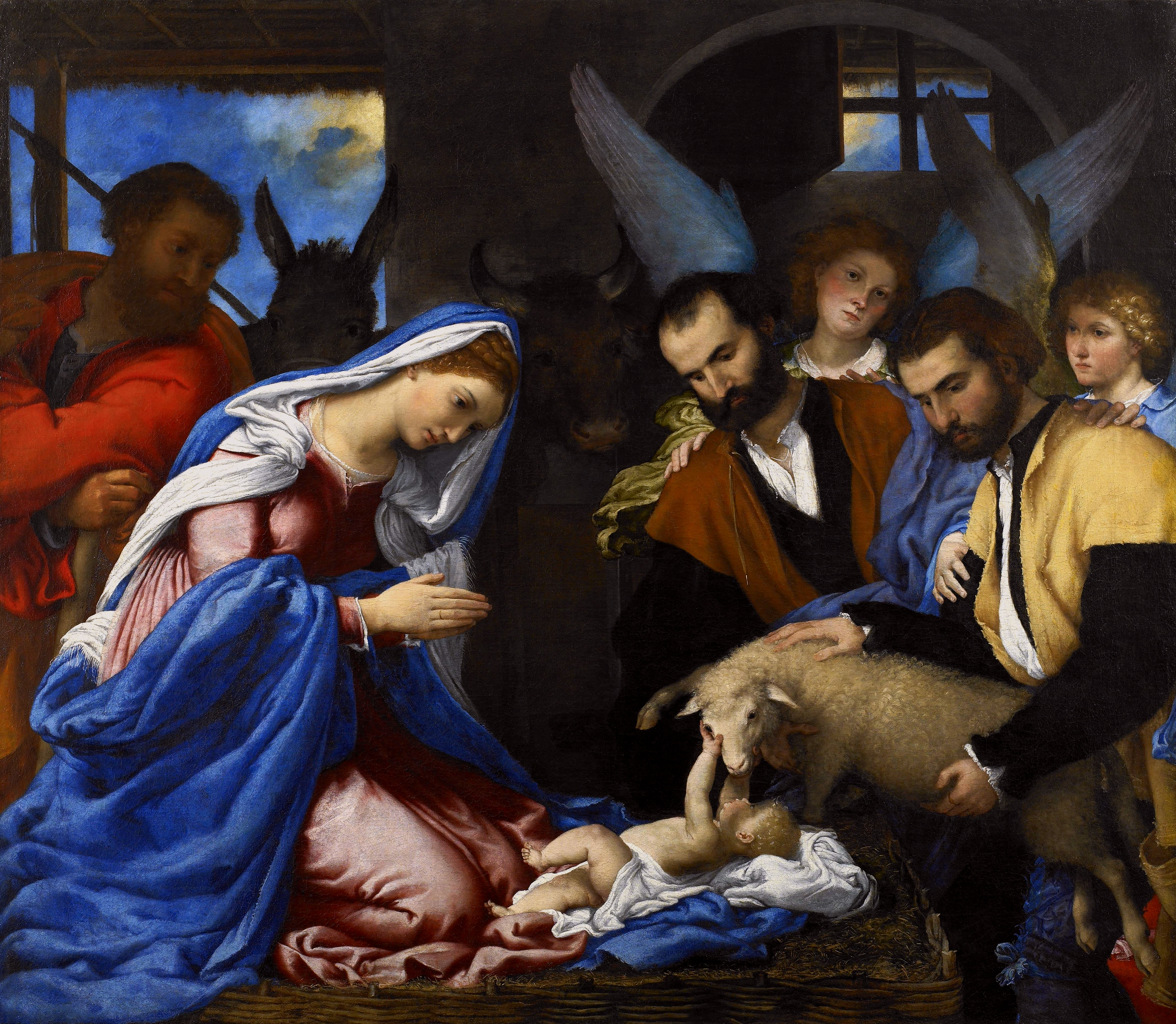
Adoration of the Shepherds by Lorenzo Lotto. c. 1534

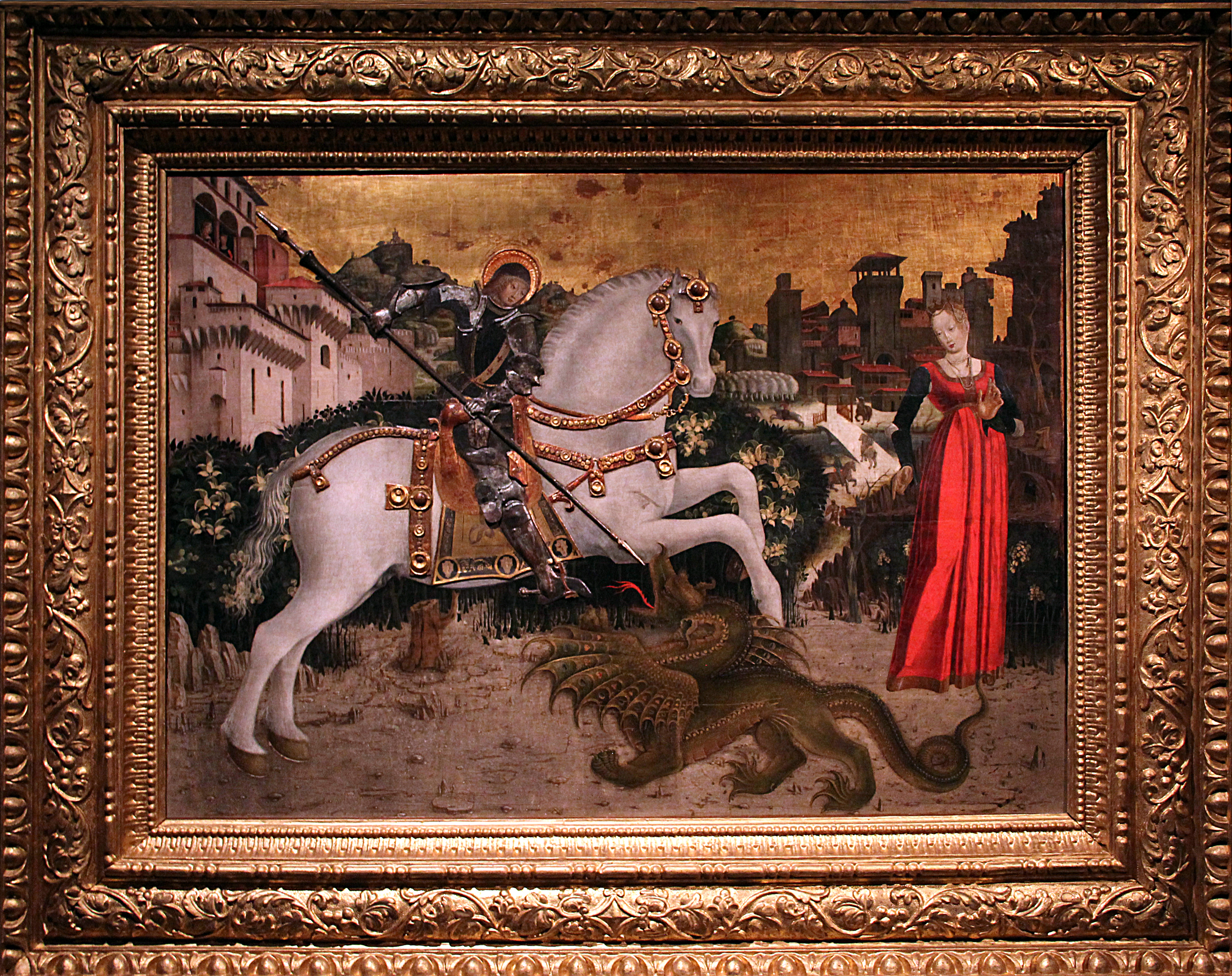
Saint George and the dragon by Antonio Cicognara, c. 1460-1465
