= Luca Mombello =

Italian painter

Luca Mombello (active mid-late 16th century) was an Italian painter of the late-Renaissance periods, mainly active in Brescia.

== Biography ==
He was born in Orzivecchi around 1518. He was the pupil of il Moretto, and respected for painting altarpieces in the Duomo Vecchio including one of the Virgin and Child with Saints Cecilia and Catherine. However he was expelled from the studio for "lubricious sins" (peccando singolarmente per piacere ad imbelli ed indotte persone di troppa lisciatura ).

== Activity ==
The Tradition, he wants skilled woodcarver of frames and, as such, seems to have entered the workshop of Moretto. His first occupation can somehow explain the anomalous absence of youth paintings and the subsequent predilection for overloaded compositions, full of ornaments. After the death of the master, in fact, Mombello will significantly accentuate his tendency towards decorativism. The contrast is evident in the early days, marked by a more careful recovery of Moretto, and maturity, aimed at decorative exuberance, which leads him to achieve a pictorial style that can be considered Mannerist. Mombello himself organized a school of painting. It is supposed that inside there could be specialized help in making lace, jewels, flowers.

== Works ==
Few works by Mombello were dated by himself, and just as rare are the autograph works. Surely among the first works, if not the first ever after the death of the master, is the completion of Abraham's Meeting with Melchisedek, commissioned to the master and left unfinished at his death. Here Mombello must necessarily trace the work of the master in order not to damage the overall vision once the work is finished. The figures therefore appear to us still very monumental and solemn. One of the last works is certainly the Madonna with Child, San Rocco, San Sebastiano and San Giuseppe in the church of San Giuseppe at Brescia, dated 1580, about 8–10 years before his death.

His figures, over the years, gradually tended to lose monumentality, to become thinner, until they appeared almost archaic. Painted by the still strong Moretti influences is the Presentation of Jesus at the Temple of the Pinacoteca Tosio Martinengo, also in Brescia. This leads to its dating shortly after The Meeting of Abraham with Melchizedek; the gestures of the characters still allow us a good overview, harmonious and solemn, even though the figures appear more minute. Other works include the Presentation of the Virgin at the Temple, Saint Helena and Portrait of a Gentlewoman in the Pinacoteca Tosio Martinengo, and The Mystic Marriage of Saint Catherine and two Saints in the Church of Santa Maria in Calchera in the same city.
