= 1580 in art =

Events from the year 1580 in art.

== Events ==
- Mannerism art period in Italy ends.

== Works ==
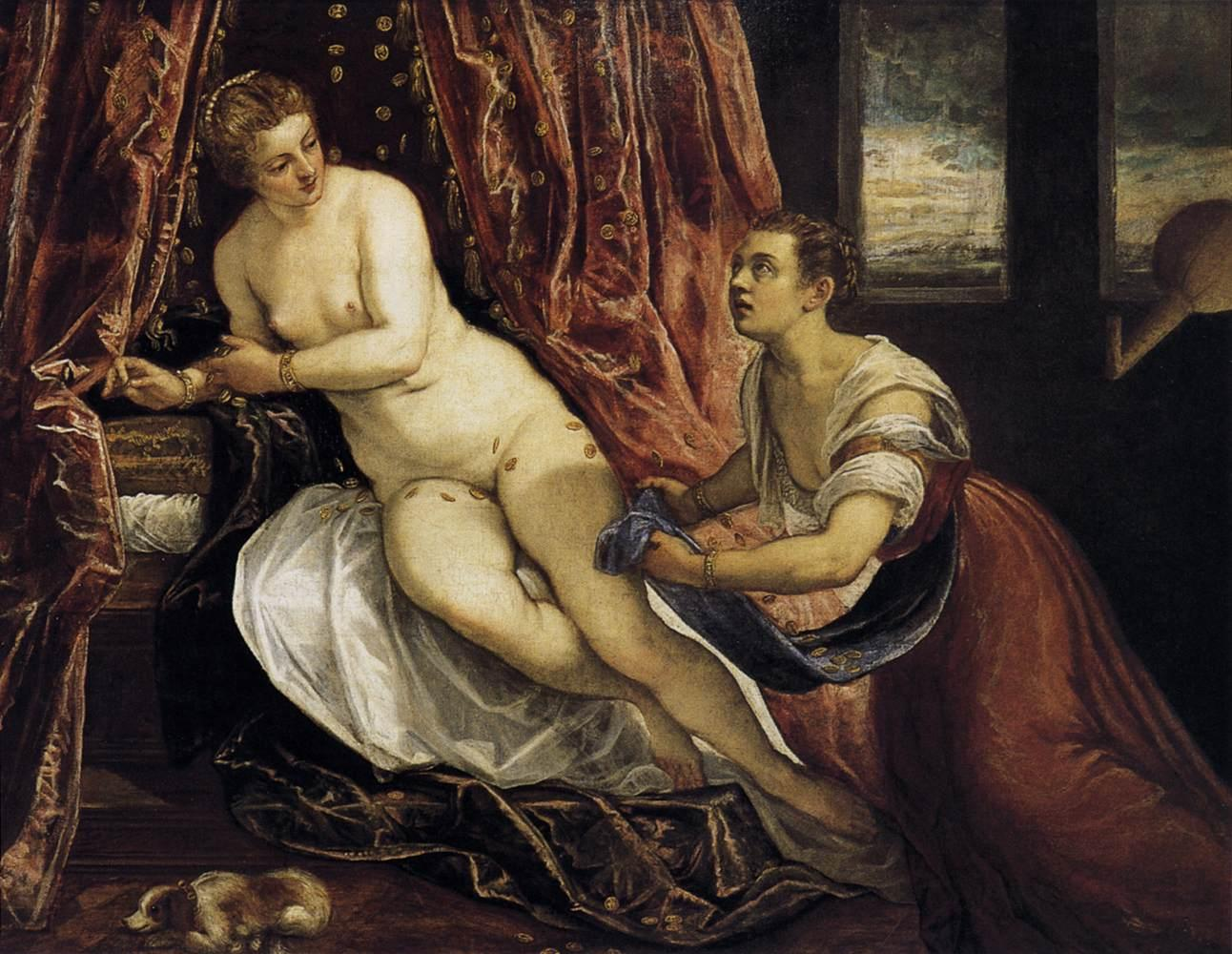
Tintoretto – Danaë, Museum of Fine Arts of Lyon

- Vincenzo Campi – The Fruit Seller (approximate date)
- Gillis Coignet - Callisto
- El Greco – Christ Carrying the Cross (approximate date)
- Tintoretto – Danaë
- Tintoretto - Baptism of Christ (approximate date)
- Jacopo Zucchi - The Miracle of the Snow

== Births ==
- January 20 – Stefano Amadei, Italian still-life painter (died 1644)
- July 18 – Giovanni Giacomo Semenza, Italian painter of the early Baroque period (died 1638)
- ?October - Willem Jacobsz Delff, Dutch painter (died 1638)
- date unknown
  - Cesare Aretusi, Italian painter primarily of portraits (died 1612)
  - Friedrich Brentel, German printmaker in engraving and etching, and miniature painter (died 1651)
  - Giovanni Domenico Cappellino, Italian painter of the Renaissance period, active mainly in his natal city of Genoa (died 1651)
  - Castellino Castello, Italian painter of the Baroque period, active mainly in Genoa (died 1649)
  - Cornelis IJsbrantsz Cussens, Dutch draughtsman and glass painter (died 1618)
  - Lorenzo Garbieri, Italian painter (died 1654)
  - Sebastiano Ghezzi, Italian painter and architect (died 1645)
  - Giacomo Locatelli, Italian painter born at Verona (died 1628)
  - William Peake, English painter and printseller (died 1639)
  - Camillo Rizzi, Italian painter (died 1618)
  - Andries Stock, Dutch painter (died 1648)
  - Friedrich van Hulsen, Dutch printmaker and engraver (died 1665)
  - Jacob van Musscher, Dutch Golden Age painter (died 1623)
  - Alessandro Vitali, Italian painter of the late-Renaissance and Baroque periods (died 1650)
- probable
  - Abdón Castañeda, Spanish Baroque painter (died 1629)
  - Luca Ciamberlano, Italian engraver (died unknown)
  - Louis Finson, Flemish painter of the Dutch Golden Age (died 1617)
  - Vincenzo Gotti, Italian painter of the Baroque period (died 1636)
  - Frans Hals, Dutch painter (died 1666)
  - Baltazar Kuncz, Polish sculptor and woodcarver (died 1650)
  - Diego de Leyva, Spanish religious painter (died 1637)
  - Hendrik Gerritsz Pot, Dutch painter (died 1657)
  - Hendrik van Steenwijk II, Dutch Baroque painter of architectural interiors (died 1649)
  - Francisco Varela, Spanish Baroque painter (died 1645)

== Deaths ==
- February 25 - Marx Weiß, German Gothic painter (born c.1518)
- date unknown
  - Livio Agresti, Italian painter of the late-Renaissance or Mannerist period (born 1508)
  - Giovan Battista della Cerva, Italian painter (born 1515)
  - Jean Chartier, French painter, draughtsman, printer and publisher (born 1500)
  - Hans Collaert, Flemish engraver (born 1525/1530)
  - Luca Longhi, Italian painter of the Mannerist period (born 1507)
- probable - Girolamo Siciolante da Sermoneta Italian Mannerist painter active in Rome (born 1521)
