= 1628 in art =

Events from the year 1628 in art.

== Events ==
- February – Gerrit Dou becomes a pupil of Rembrandt; the latter, then 22 years of age, paints a cheerful self-portrait, which will be sold 380 years later, in 2008, for 4.5 million dollars.
- August 10 – Maiden voyage (and sinking) of Swedish royal warship Vasa which is richly decorated with wood sculptures by Mårten Redtmer and others.
- Willem van Haecht becomes curator of the art collection owned by Cornelis van der Geest.
- Gerard van Honthorst visits the court of King Charles I of England.

== Works ==
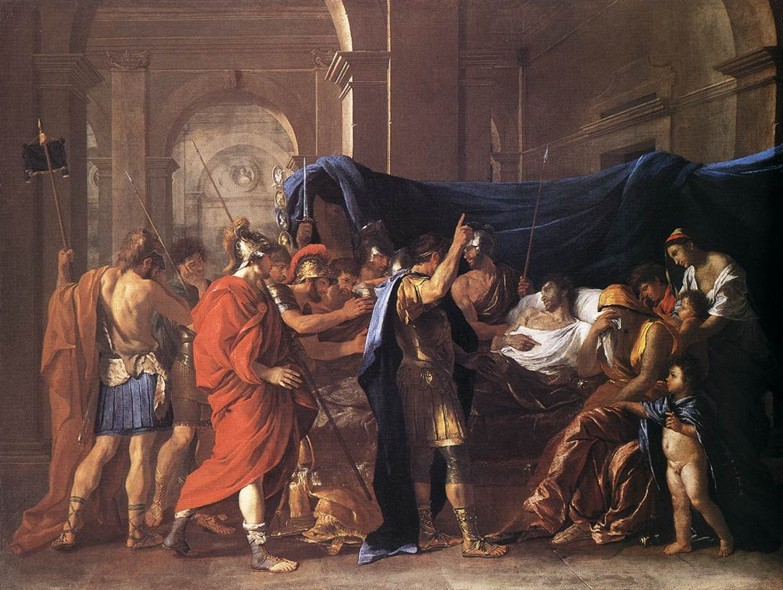
Poussin – The Death of Germanicus

- Nicolas Poussin – The Death of Germanicus
- Francisco de Zurbarán – Saint Serapion
- Cornelis van Haarlem – The Judgement of Paris (approximate date)
- Anthony van Dyck
  - Nicolas Lanier
  - The Shepherd Paris (approximate date)
- Diego Velázquez – Portrait of the Infanta Maria of Austria (approximate date)

== Births ==
- January 6 - Balthazard Marsy, French sculptor (died 1674)
- March 17 – François Girardon, French sculptor (died 1715)
- April 22 – Georg Matthäus Vischer, cartographer, topographer and engraver (died 1696)
- May 15 – Carlo Cignani, Italian painter of the Bolognese school (died 1719)
- August – Pedro de Mena, Spanish sculptor (died 1688)
- December 25 – Noël Coypel, French painter (died 1707)
- date unknown
  - Jan Pieter Brueghel, Flemish Baroque painter (died 1664)
  - Guillaume Courtois, French painter and etcher (died 1679)
  - Biagio Falcieri, Italian painter of the Baroque era (died 1703)
  - Prosper Henricus Lankrink, Flemish painter (died 1692)
  - Heinrich Meyring, German sculptor (died 1723)
  - Andrea Suppa, Italian painter of marine landscapes (died 1671)
  - Giovanni Battista Venanzi, Italian painter of churches in the Baroque period (d. unknown)
- probable
  - Jacob Isaakszoon van Ruisdael, Dutch landscape painter (died 1682)
  - 1628/1629: Herman van Aldewereld, Dutch portrait painter (died 1669)

== Deaths ==
- January 14 – Francisco Ribalta, Spanish painter, mostly of religious subjects (born 1565)
- October – Juan Ribalta, Spanish painter, son of Francisco Ribalta (born 1597)
- October 14 - Palma il Giovane, Italian Mannerist painter from Venice (born 1548/1550)
- date unknown
  - Hans Collaert, Flemish engraver and draughtsman (born 1545)
  - Baldassare Croce, Italian academic painter and director of the Accademia di San Luca (born 1558)
  - Bartolomé de Cárdenas, Spanish painter (born 1575)
  - Giacomo Locatelli, Italian painter born at Verona (born 1580)
  - Jan Harmensz. Muller, Dutch painter (born 1571)
  - Ding Yunpeng, Chinese painter especially of human figures and landscapes (born 1547)
  - 1628/1629: Johannes Bosschaert, member of the Bosschaert family of still life painters (born 1606/1608)
  - 1628/1629: Simon Frisius, Dutch engraver (born 1570-75)
  - 1628/1632: Rafael Sadeler I, Flemish engraver of the Sadeler family (born 1560/1561)
