= 1649 in art =

Events from the year 1649 in art.

== Events ==
- Rembrandt and Gerard Dou are painting during this year.

== Paintings ==
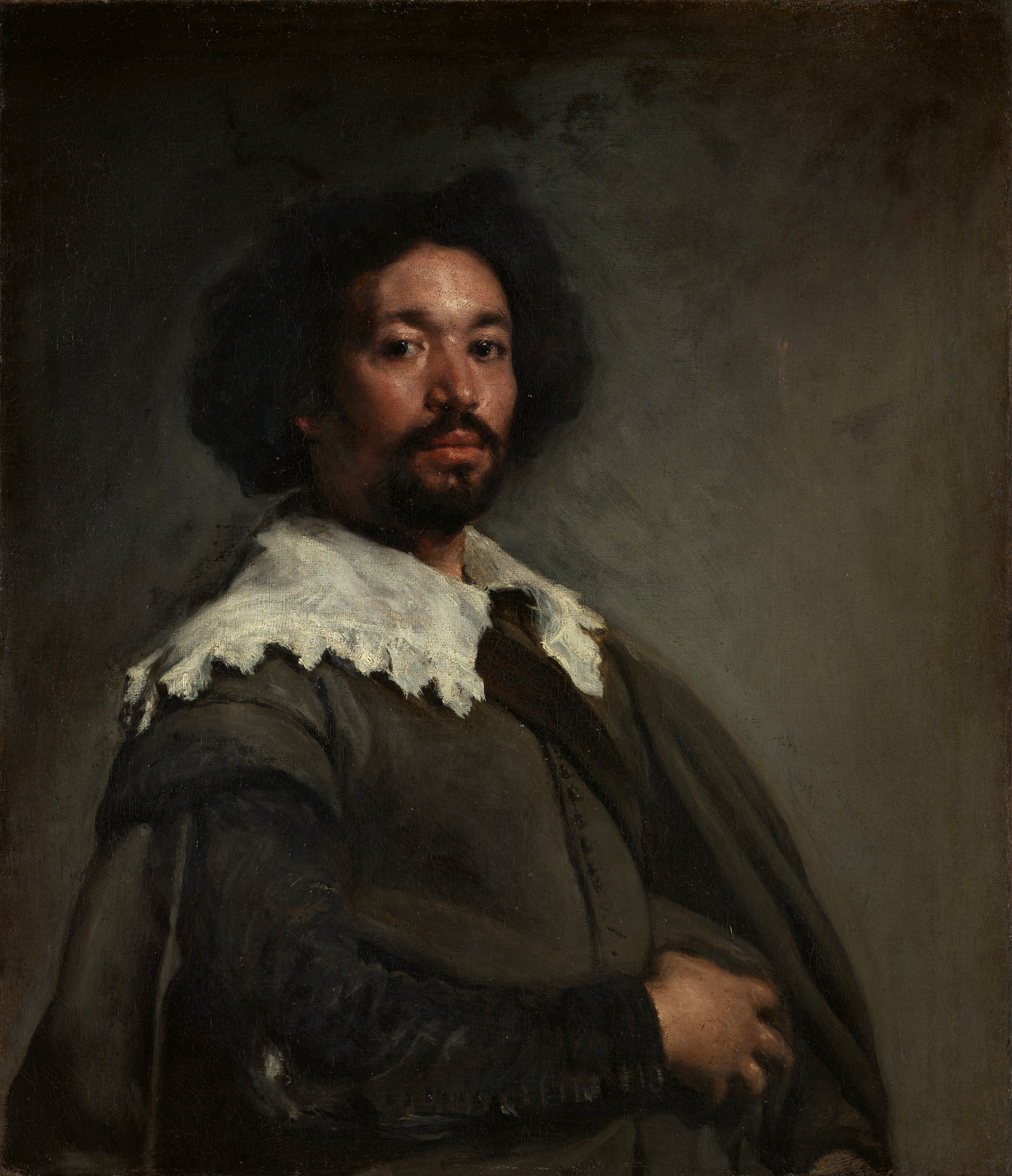
Velázquez - Portrait of Juan de Pareja

van Ruysdael - Ferry on a River

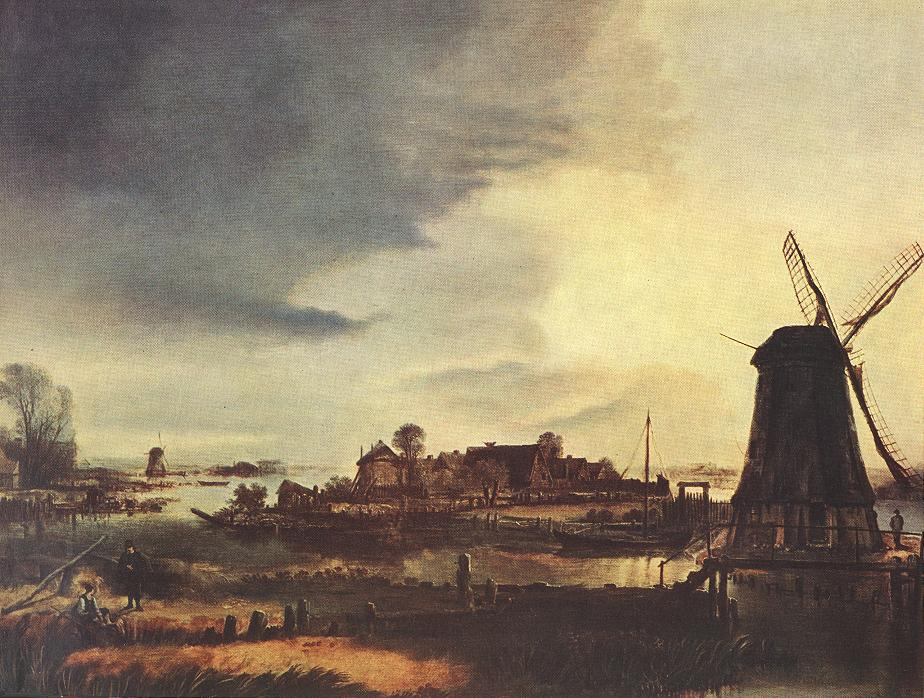
van der Neer - Landscape with Windmill

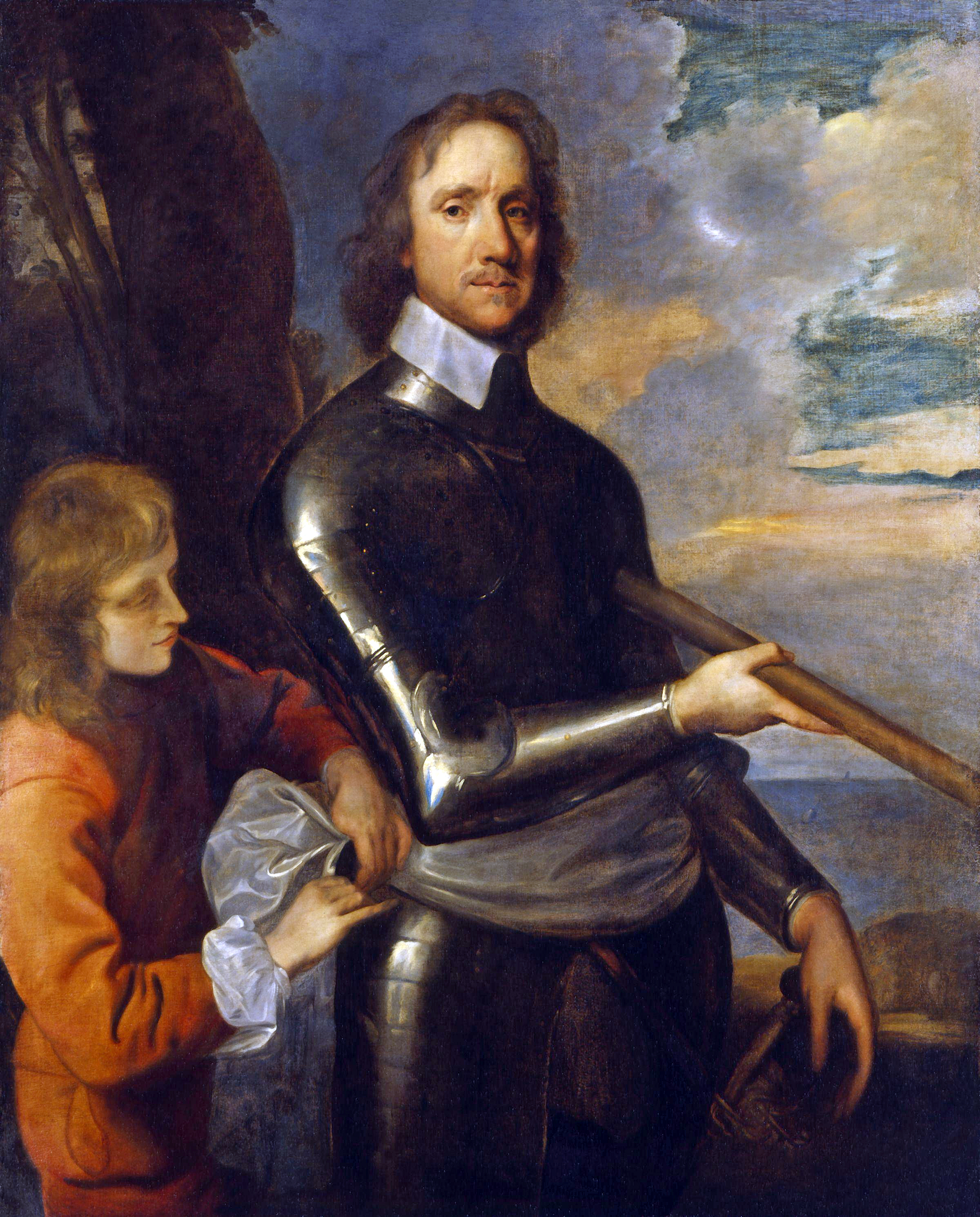
Portrait of Oliver Cromwell by Robert Walker
- Aert van der Neer - Landscape with Windmill (1647–49)
- Paulus Potter - A Young Bull and Two Cows in a Meadow
- Nicolas Poussin (some dates approximate)
  - The Holy Family
  - The Judgement of Solomon
  - Vision of St Paul
  - Two self-portraits
- David Ryckaert - Suffering of the Peasants
- Salomon van Ruysdael - Ferry on a River
- Diego Velázquez - Portrait of Juan de Pareja (approximate date)
- Robert Walker – Portrait of Oliver Cromwell

== Births ==
- January 12 - Jacques Carrey, French painter and draughtsman (died 1726)
- July 4 - William Lodge, English engraver and printmaker (died 1689)
- date unknown
  - Bon Boullogne, French painter (died 1717)
  - Elias van den Broeck (or Broek), Dutch artist (died 1708)
  - Paolo Antonio Paderna, Italian painter of the Baroque period born in Bologna (died 1708)
  - Hermione van Rijn, second child of Rembrandt and Saskia van Uylenburgh
  - Giovanni Stefano Robatto, Italian painter for churches in Genoa (died 1733)
  - Cristóbal de Villalpando, Mexican painter (died 1714)
  - Jan van der Brugge, Flemish Baroque painter and engraver (died 1699)

== Deaths ==
- January 22 - Alessandro Turchi, Italian painter (born 1578)
- April 1 - Juan Bautista Mayno, Spanish painter of the Baroque period (born 1569)
- June 18 - Juan Martínez Montañés, also known as el Dios de la Madera, Spanish sculptor (born 1568)
- June 20 - Maria Tesselschade Visscher, Dutch poet and engraver (born 1594)
- June 28 - Gioacchino Assereto, Italian painter, active in Genoa (born 1600)
- July 29 - David Teniers the Elder, Flemish painter (born 1582)
- August 16 - Henricus Hondius II, Dutch painter (born 1573)
- October - Isaac van Ostade, Dutch genre and landscape painter (born 1621)
- November 2 - Antonio Barbalonga, Italian painter (born 1600)
- date unknown
  - Jan Baptist Barbé, Flemish engraver (born 1578)
  - Paolo Antonio Barbieri, Italian painter who was the brother of Guercino (born 1603)
  - Aniella di Beltrano, Italian woman painter (born 1613)
  - Alfonso Boschi, Italian painter of the Baroque period, active mainly in Florence (born 1615)
  - Sebastiano Brunetti, Italian painter active in his native Bologna (born unknown)
  - Andrea Camassei, Italian painter active in Rome under the patronage of the Barberini (born 1602)
  - Castellino Castello, Italian painter, active mainly in Genoa (born 1580)
  - Giovanni Battista Coriolano, Italian engraver (born 1590)
  - Juan de Zurbarán, Spanish Baroque painter (born 1620)
  - Cornelis Willemsz Eversdijck, Dutch portrait painter (born unknown)
  - Francesco Gessi, Italian painter of frescoes (born 1588)
  - Abraham Matthijs, Flemish Baroque painter (born 1581)
  - Hendrik van Steenwijk II, Dutch Baroque painter of architectural interiors (born 1580)
- probable - Ludovicus Neefs, Flemish painter (born 1617)
