= Castellino =

Castellino may refer to:

- Castellino del Biferno, a commune in Italy
- Castellino Tanaro, a commune in Italy
- Castellino Castello (1580–1649), Italian painter
- Alexandre Castellino (1881–?), Swiss racing cyclist

== See also ==
- Castelino
