= Simone Cantarini =

Italian etcher and painter (1612–1648)

- Self portrait, 1630s
- Born: 12 April 1612; Pesaro, Italy
- Died: 15 October 1648; Verona, Italy
- Known for: Painting, etching

Simone Cantarini or Simone da Pesaro, called il Pesarese (Baptized on 21 August 1612 – 15 October 1648) was an Italian painter and etcher. He is known mainly for his history paintings and portraits executed in an original style, which united aspects of Bolognese classicism with a bold naturalism.

As an etcher, Cantarini is noted for his luminous and delicate effects.

== Life ==
Cantarini was born in Pesaro, now a town in the Italian region of the Marche, then part of the Papal States and ruled by the Della Rovere. He was baptized on 21 August 1612. His father Girolamo was a prominent merchant and the family was well-off.

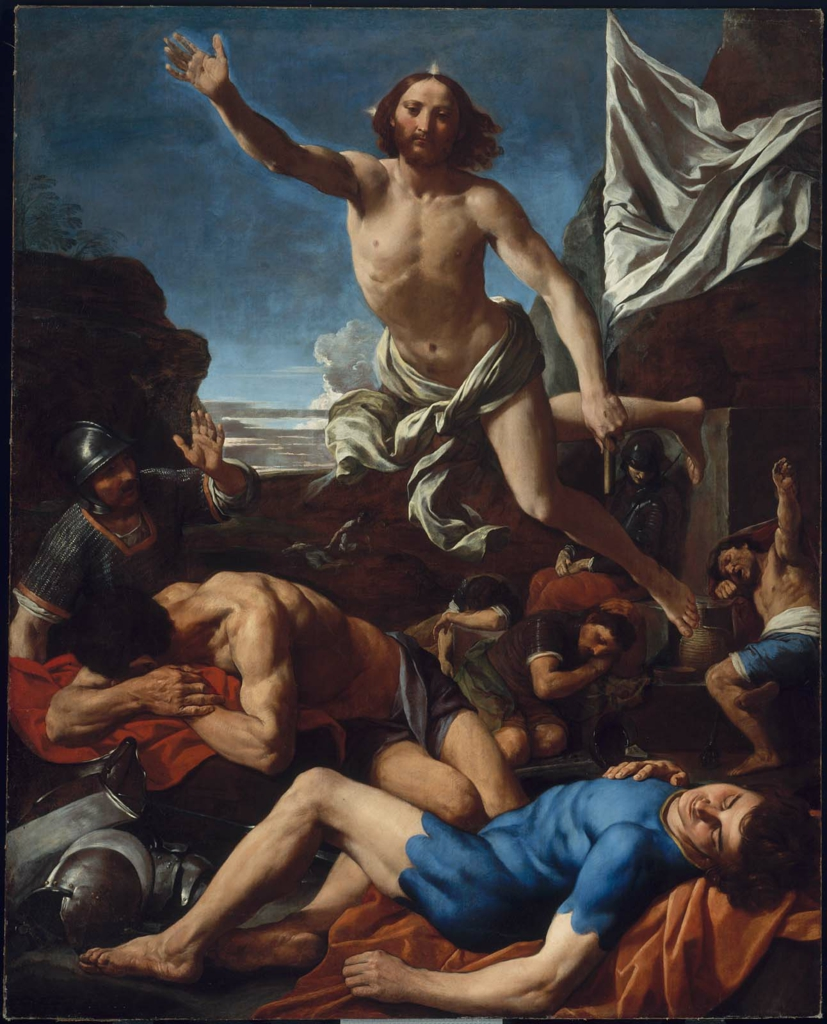
The risen Christ

There is no documentary information on Cantarini's early training. Initially he may have been a pupil of Giovanni Giacomo Pandolfi. A religious person from a church in Pesaro who supported Cantarini's artistic career accompanied the young artist on a trip to Venice. In Venice he benefitted from the guidance of the Venetian late-Mannerist painter Sante Peranda and learned drawing skills from Francesco Mingucci, a fellow citizen of Pesaro residing in Venice. He returned to Pesaro and received his first commissions from the Augustinian order in Pesaro and nearby Fano. His first commissions included the painting Saint Rita of Cascia, now in the Saint Augustine Church of Pesaro, and The Immaculate Conception with Saints (Pinacoteca Nazionale di Bologna).

It is assumed that Cantarini became a pupil of Claudio Ridolfi although the precise timing of the training is not known. Ridolfi would have passed on to him the Venetian style and a strong appreciation for the work of Federico Barocci, a collaborator of Ridolfi in Urbino. After Ridolfi left Pesaro in 1629, Cantarini was left without a teacher and was thus compelled to pursue his artistic training on his own.

As he was not tutored by a single master in his early years, Simone Cantarini was mostly self-taught and he absorbed the styles of other painters by making copies or sketches after their works. The prints by the Carracci together with the work of Federico Barocci were important influences on the young artist. He further drew inspiration from the caravaggesque art of Orazio Gentileschi, who worked in the Marche region during the 1610s, and of Giovanni Francesco Guerrieri from nearby Fossombrone.

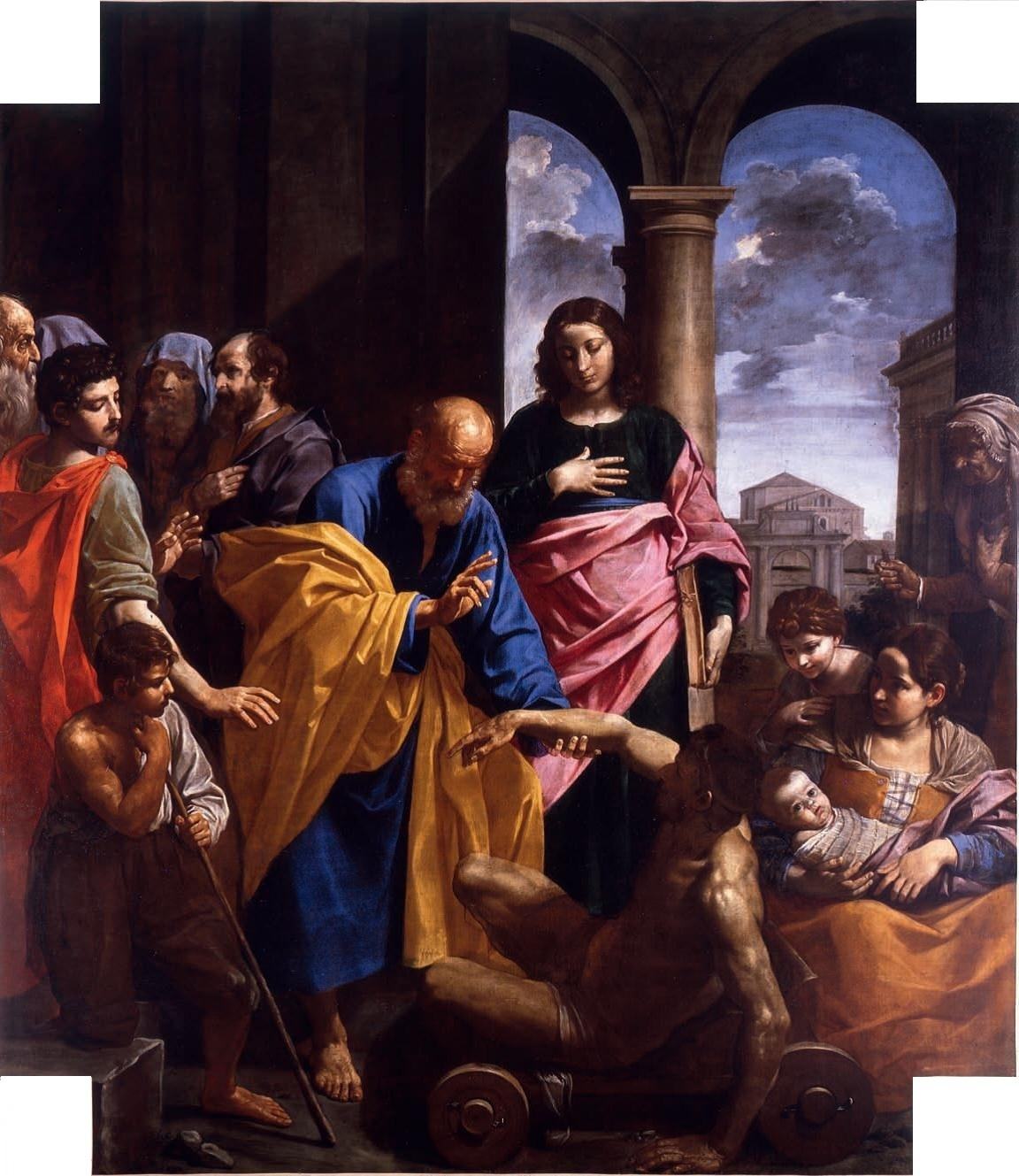
Saint Peter healing the lame man

Guido Reni's work was present in various churches in the vicinity of Pesaro and Reni's mature style had an important influence on the young Cantarini. In particular, Catarini studied Reni's Madonna and Child with Saints Thomas and Jerome that hung at the time in Pesaro Cathedral (now in the Pinacoteca Vaticana), and the Giving of the Keys to Saint Peter (1626, now in the Louvre, Paris) and the Annunciation (1620–21) that were in the church of San Pietro in Valle in nearby Fano. Cantarini started to receive commissions and one of his earliest masterpieces was the St Peter Healing the Lame Man, which was also placed in the church of San Pietro in Valle in Fano. This work reveals Reni's important influence.

Presumably around 1634 Cantarini joined Reni's studio, which was located in the via delle Pescherie near the piazza Maggiore in the old city centre of Bologna. Reni's studio was a form of boarding school and artist's studio. Reni considered Cantarini an experienced artist as he was soon allowed to stay on the principal floor of the house, which was reserved for Reni's more valued followers. Here he proved to be a student who had problems connecting with the other students and failed to attend classes such as the nude class, which brought him in conflict with the teacher of that class. During his stay in Reni' s studio Cantarini learned to etch and became very skilled in that technique.

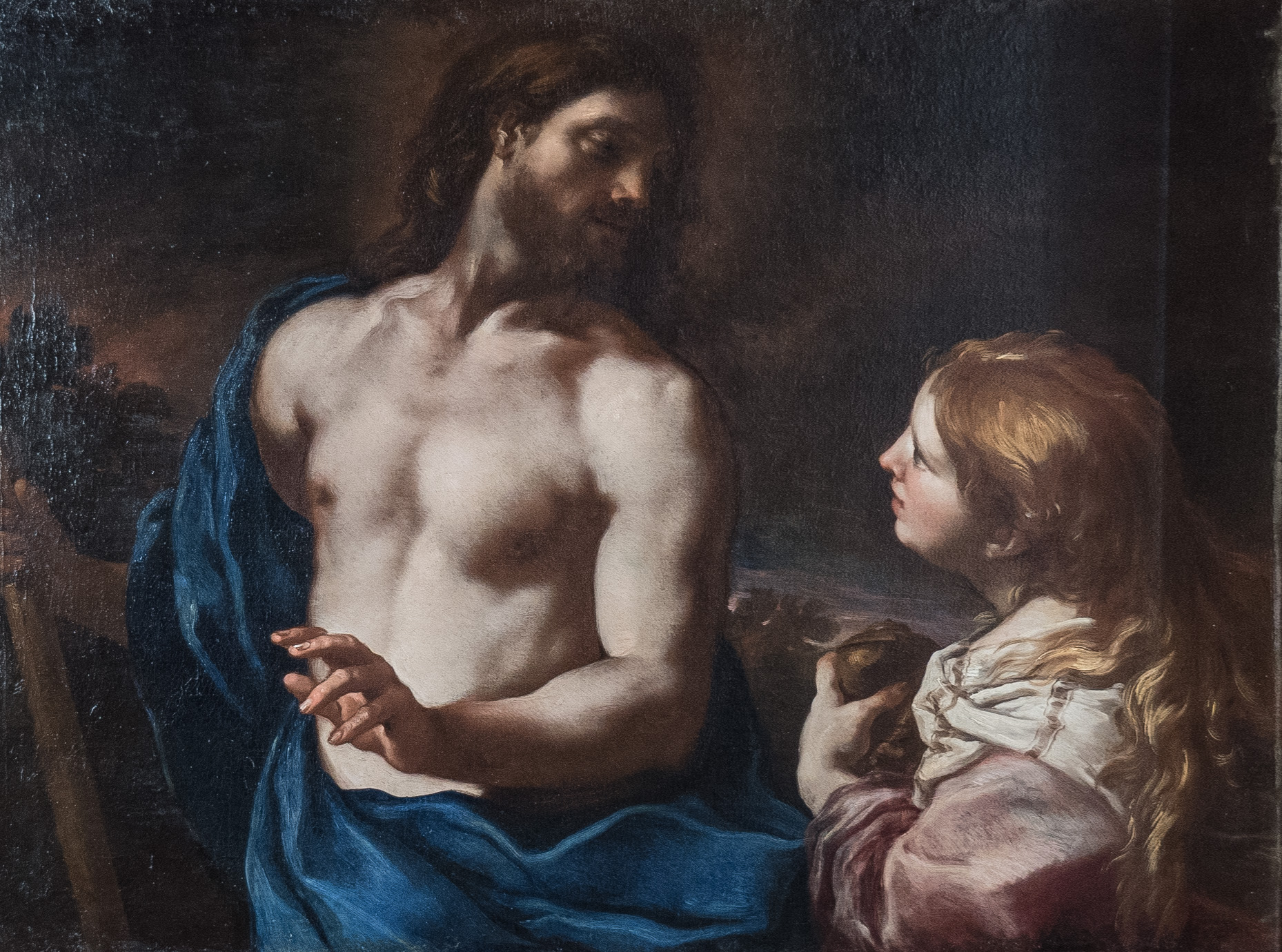
Noli me tangere

Contemporary biographers describe a gradually deteriorating relationship between the master and pupil. The reasons for this are not entirely clear but have been attributed to Cantarini's inability to submit to the discipline of Reni's school and the fact that works of the pupil were sold with the signature of the master to increase their price. Cantarini further refused to engrave Guido's designs on the ground that his own works were as much worthy of publication. It is also possible that the pupil who had discovered the earlier masterpieces of Reni in the churches near his hometown was less impressed with the late style of Reni, which tended increasingly towards metaphysical visions populated with bloodless images. According to some stories the uneasy relationship between the two artists came to an explosive halt when Reni criticized a work of Cantarini in front of other students upon which Cantarini threw the painting against the wall. The break with Reni lead to a drought in new commissions, which forced Cantarini to leave Bologna.

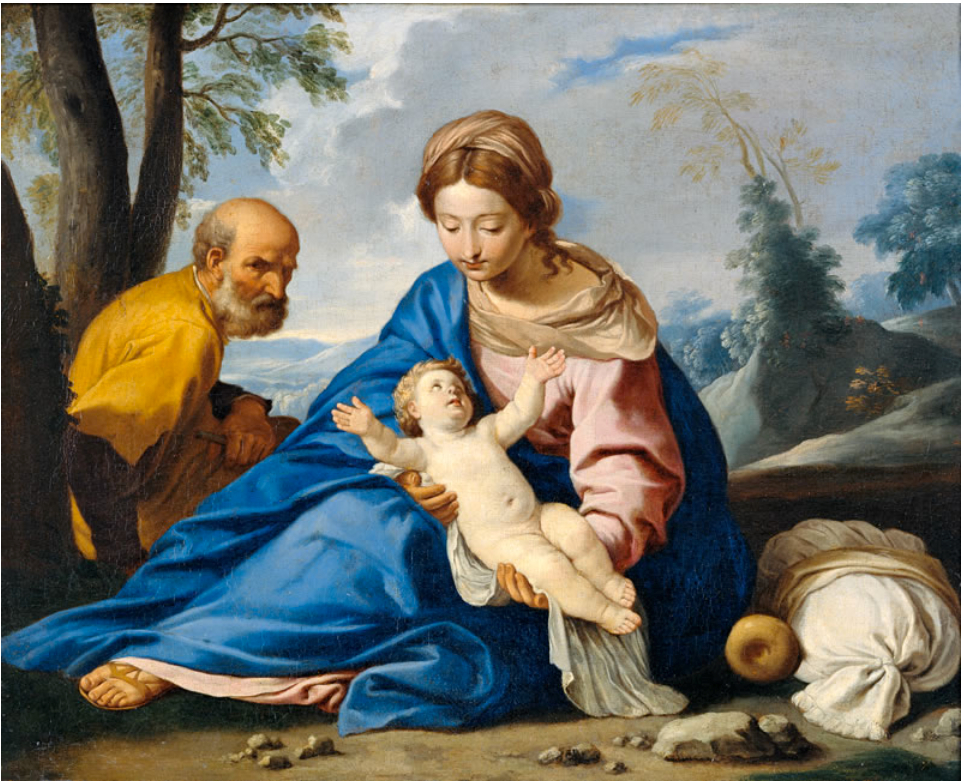
Rest on the flight into Egypt

Cantarini is recorded back in his native Pesaro in 1639. He is said to have had a relationship with a local young woman with whom he had extramarital children.

He made a brief trip to Rome in 1640 or 1641. After Reni's death in 1642, Cantarini returned to Bologna. Here he opened his own studio in the Palazzo Zambeccari, where he trained local artists such as Lorenzo Pasinelli, Flaminio Torre, Giulio Cesare Milani, Giovanni Peruzzini, Giovanni Maria Luffoli, and the engraver Girolamo Rossi. Giovanni Venanzi was also very likely his pupil.

In 1647, Cantarini was invited to Mantua by Carlo II Gonzaga of Nevers. Since it took him too long to finish the portrait the Duke had commissioned he was relieved of his duties. He became seriously ill and moved to Verona, where he died. Some biographers claim that Cantarini had created a scandal through his behavior and criticisms of the Gonzaga collection and it was suspected that he was poisoned by an angry rival.

== Work ==
=== General ===
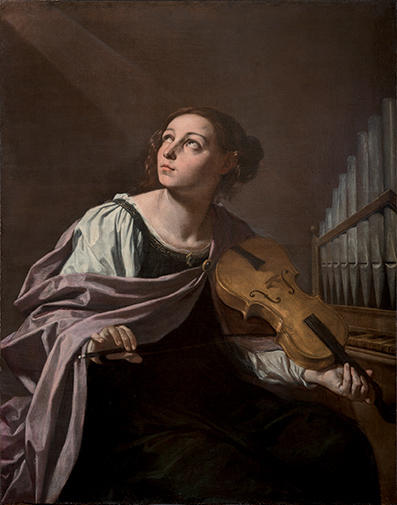
Saint Cecilia

Cantarini was principally a painter of the Counterreformation who painted religious subjects. The majority of Reni's compositions deal with religious subject matter, principally taken from the New Testament. He was particularly interested in depicting scenes involving the Holy Family and the Holy Virgin, either in portrait settings with St Joseph and other saints or in scenes like the flight into Egypt. He was also a gifted portrait painter. Cantarini was further a prolific engraver and draughtsman.

His work shows the influence of various artists with the influence of Guido Reni being the most important one. He was able to develop his own personal style from what he had learned from Reni combining elements of Baroque with Classicist tendencies.

His early works reveal a Venetian influence by their clear interest in light and colour. His presumed master Claudio Ridolfi instilled in him an appreciation of Federico Barocci, which was reflected in the soft sfumato of the faces of his Virgins and saints, their idyllic mood and tender feeling. His early works show further his study of the works of Raphael and the early work of Correggio. He further drew inspiration from the caravaggesque art of Orazio Gentileschi and Giovanni Francesco Guerrieri from whom he acquired a powerful naturalism.

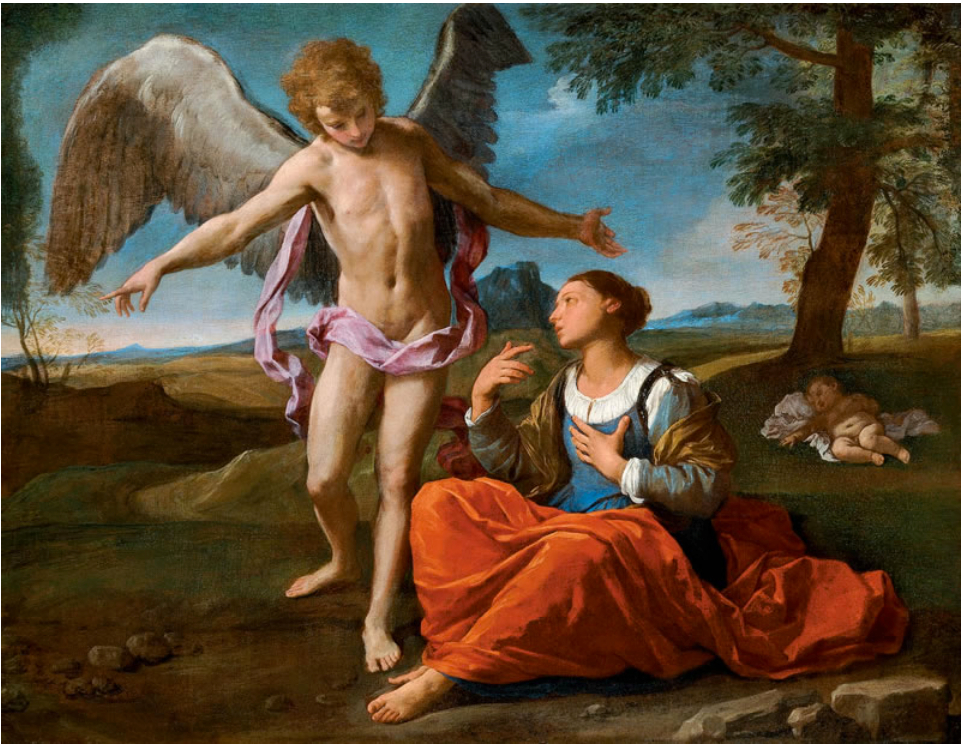
Archangel Michael with Hagar and Ishmael in the Desert

In the early 1630s, he became increasingly absorbed in the work of Guido Reni that was present in various churches in and around his hometown. He made copies of, and made sketches after, Reni's work. An early work reflecting this influence of Reni is St Peter Healing the Lame Man (church of San Pietro in Valle, Fano) dating from around 1634. Other works from this early period are the Saint Thomas of Villanova (Pinacoteca Civica, Fano) and the Virgin of the girdle.

During his stay in Reni's studio the influence of Reni only became stronger. After the rupture with Reni, Cantarini's work developed towards a more personal style. He abandoned academic classicism in favour of the naturalism of his youth. He also developed a freer, more lyrical style.

In this period he created the Rest on the Flight into Egypt (Louvre, Paris) and Susanna and the Elders (c. 1640; Pinacoteca Nazionale di Bologna). After his visit to Rome in the early 1640s he moved closer to the tradition of Raphael, yet without abandoning naturalism. His Rest on the Flight into Egypt (Pinacoteca di Brera, Milan) is based on Raphael's Madonna del Velo (Musée Condé, Chantilly). Other works from this period show an influence of Venetian painting and a development towards freeer brushwork.

=== Portraits ===
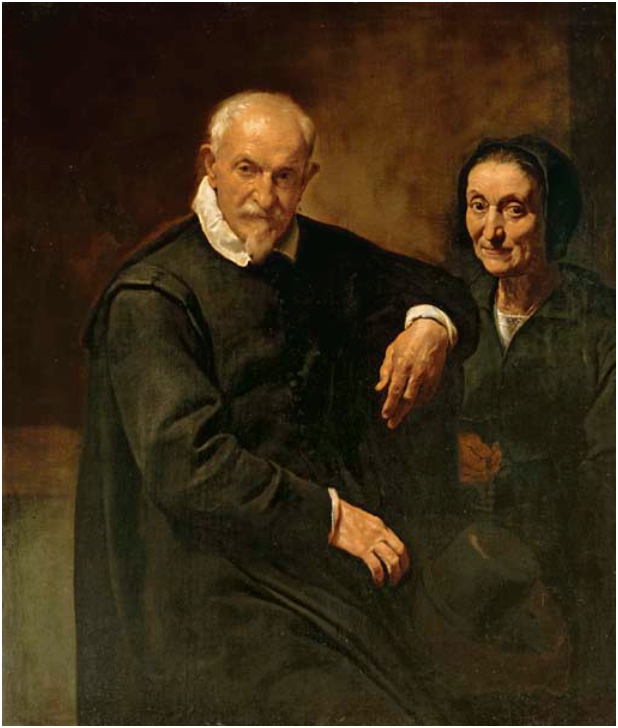
Portrait of a seated gentleman and a lady holding a rosary

Already from his earliest days as an artist, Cantarini distinguished himself as a portrait painter. His earliest known portrait is a Portrait of a nun (1629, Galleria Pallavicini). Noble Pesaro families such as the Albani, Olivieri, Gavardini, Mosca and Baldassini ordered portraits from him. In 1633, he portrayed another prominent sitter: Antonio Barberini, the prominent Catholic cardinal, patron of the arts and a member of the House of Barberini. Another portrait, which shows the artist's skills as a portrait painter at their peak is the Portrait of a seated gentleman and a lady holding a rosary (Museo civico medievale in Bologna). It was painted around the same time as the portrait of Antonio Barberini.

One of his best-known portraits is the Portrait of Guido Reni, which probably dates from around the time of the breakup between Cantarini and Reni. The portrait is in tondo format. Due do its success many copies were made and various versions exist, including a larger one with a diameter of 60 cm in a private collection in Pesaro and a smaller one with a diameter of 36 cm (possibly a copy) in the Pinacoteca Nazionale di Bologna. It is believed the larger one, which shows the sitter in half-length format, is the original. The larger format allowed the artist to represent his master in stylish clothing with a fine lace over the white collar and a golden collar pendant on his chest. The brush in the larger portrait is smoother, more fluid and richer in the soft passages than in the smaller portrait. The face of Reni thus acquires a greater liveliness and is infused with an expression of inner balance, rather than with impulsive anger as in the smaller copy in Bologna in the sample.

=== Etchings ===
Cantarini was a prolific etcher to whom are securely attributed 37 plates of mythological, religious and allegorical subjects. His prints were praised in his lifetime for their extraordinary delicacy and vibrant and luminous quality. Cantarini treated his plates in the same way as a piece of paper by using nervous and flickering signs. Cantarini's skill as a designer/draughtsman informed his work as an etcher by allowing him to arrive at graphic simplification to great effectiveness.

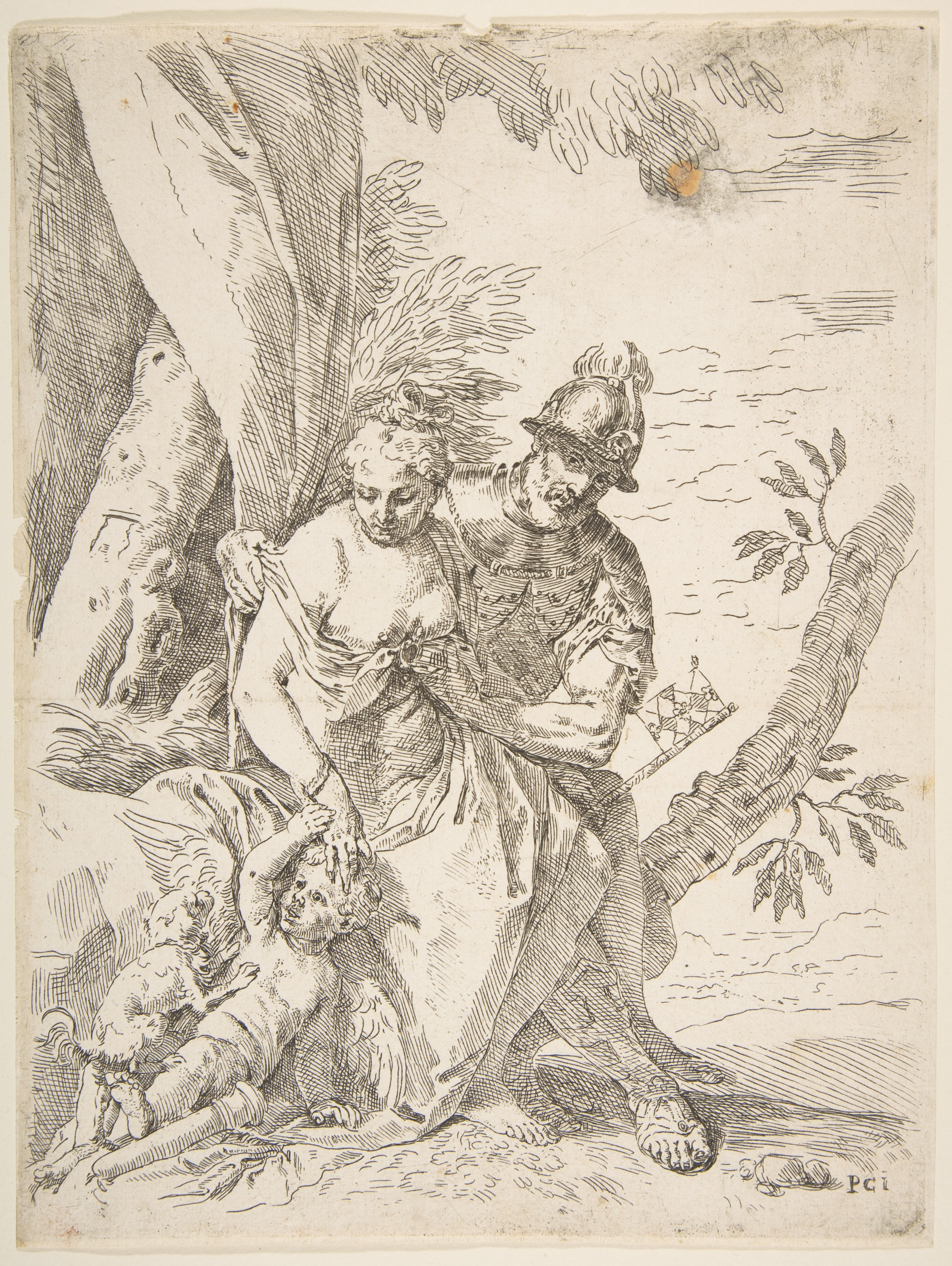
Mars, Venus and Cupid

Cantarini is known to have followed a set procedure in the design and creation of his prints: he would start with a general sketch of the composition in pen or pencil. After having thus studied the details of the composition one by one, he traced the design in red stone, with the details defined. The design was then replicated in pen in its final dimensions using a grid and then transferred on a copper plate and etched.
