= Burgruine Starhemberg =

Ruined castle in Austria

- Lower Austria, Austria
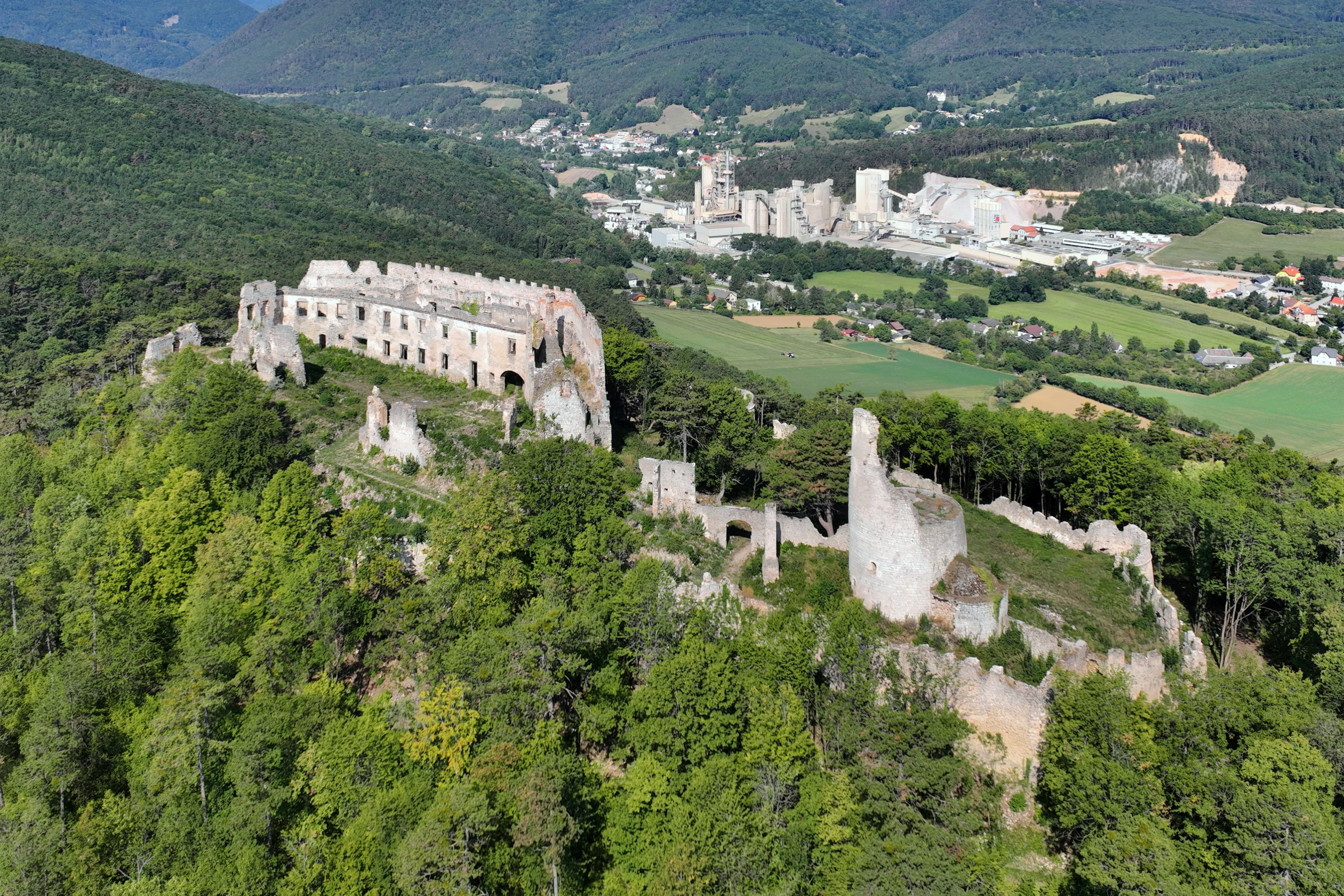
- East-southeast view of the Starhemberg castle ruins

Site information
- Type: Castle
- Open to the public: Not since 2007
- Condition: Ruins

Location
- Coordinates: 47°52′03″N 16°06′07″E

Site history
- Built: 1140–45
- Built by: Ottokar III, Margrave of Styria

Burgruine Starhemberg was a castle in Lower Austria, Austria. Built in the 1140s, the castle fell into ruins by the late 19th century. Burgruine Starhemberg is 520 metres (1,710 ft) above sea level.

== History ==
The name is derived from the original name of 'high mountain' or 'Starkenberg'.

A small castle was built here by Ottokar III, Margrave of Styria between 1140 and 1145. At the time, the Piesting river was the border between Styria and the March of Austria. In 1192, Styria—and, thus, the castle—was acquired by the Babenbergs. The last Babenberger duke of Austria, Frederick II the Warlike, expanded and fortified the castle, leaving Starhemberg as one of the most important castles in Lower Austria in the 13th century. In wartime, the archives and the family treasure was hidden here, and were guarded by the Teutonic Knights.

After the Battle on the Marchfeld in 1278, the castle was acquired by the Habsburgs. In 1482, the castle was captured by Matthias Corvinus, king of Hungary. In 1683, the castle offered protection from the Turks to the surrounding population.

To escape a new roof-tax the counts of Heusenstamm around 1800 had the roof covering removed, as well as doors and window frames, beginning the decline of the castle. Around 1870, a large part of the great hall collapsed. Until the mid-20th century, the ruins were used for the extraction of construction materials by the local population.

In the spring of 1945 a unit of the Waffen-SS used the ruined tower above the chapel as an observation post. Russian artillery fire inflicted heavy damage to the walls.

In the second half of the 20th century a local organisation, Friends of the Castle Starhemberg, has sought to restore the ruins. Since 2007, the castle has been closed to visitors, for security.

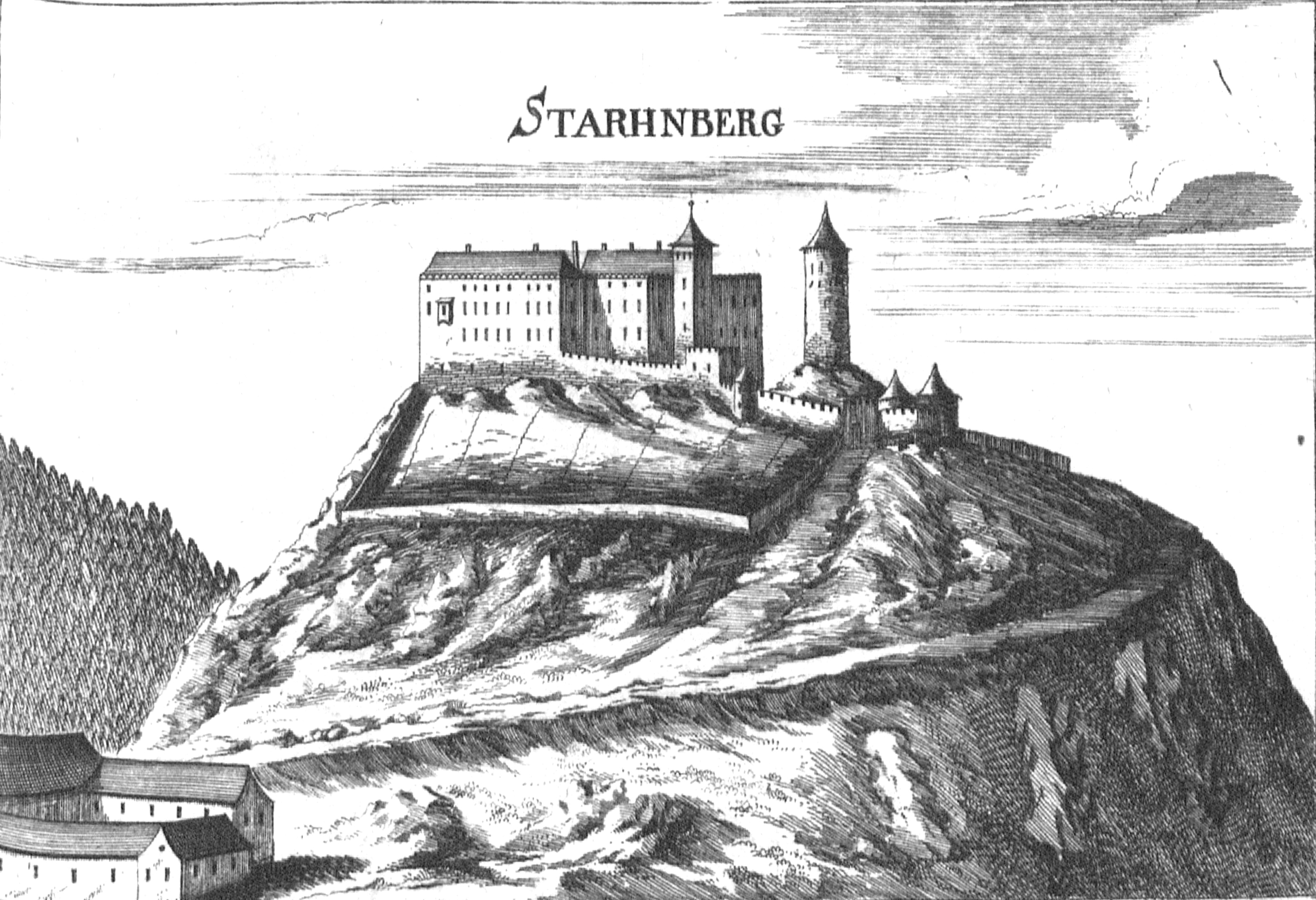
Copper engraving by Georg Matthäus Vischer, 1672

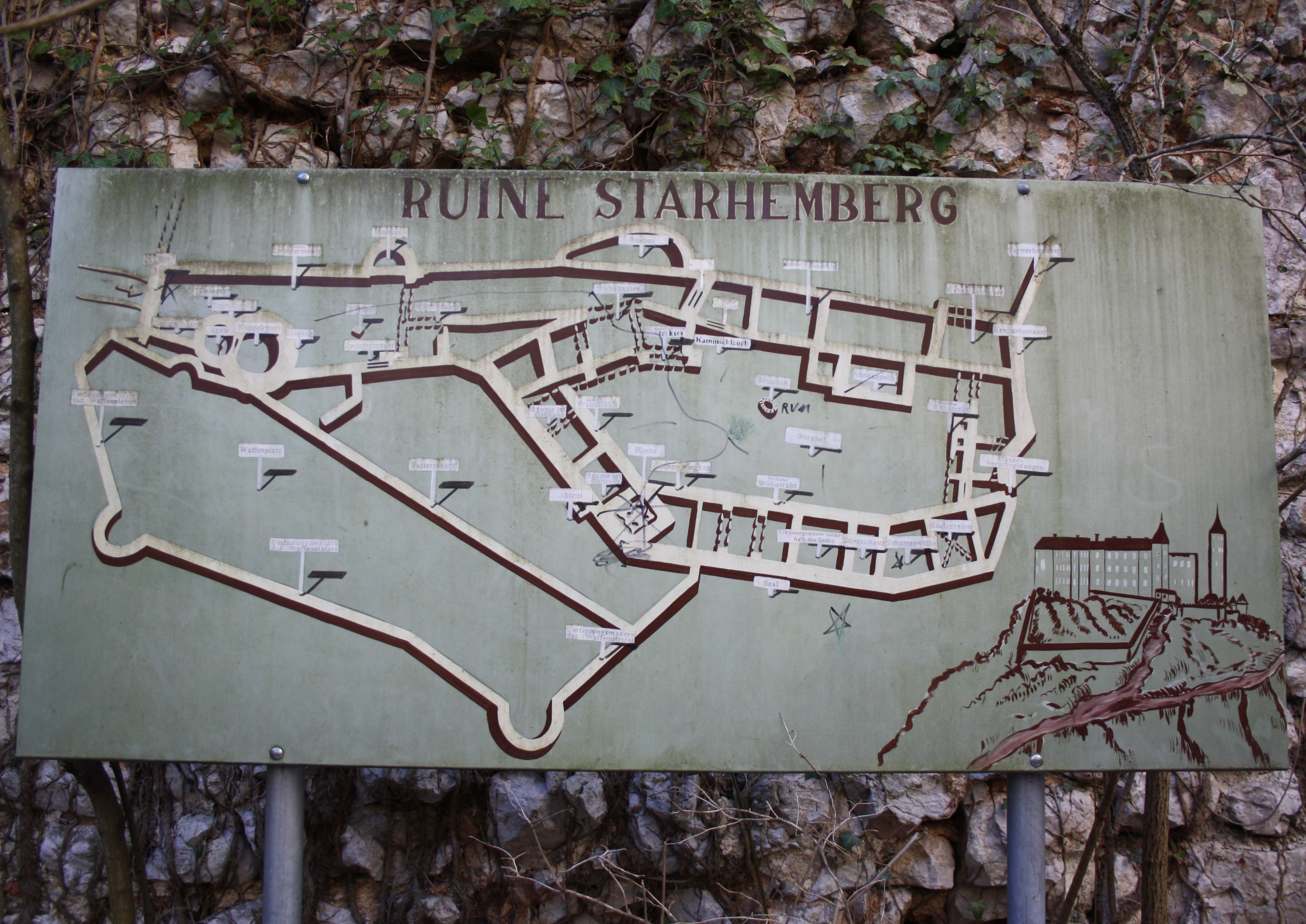
Castle Starhemberg's ground plan

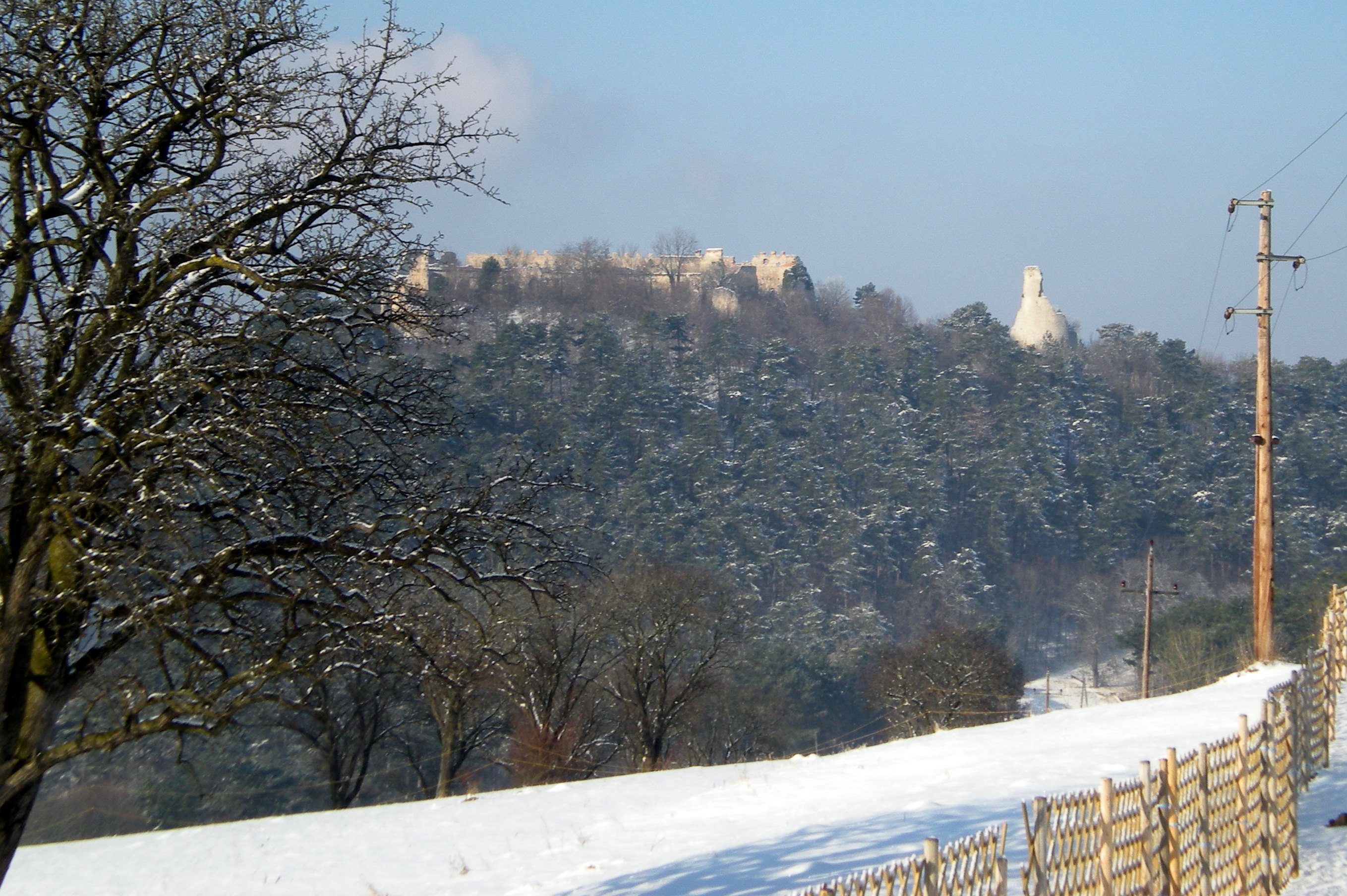
Castle Ruin Starhemberg, contemporary south elevation

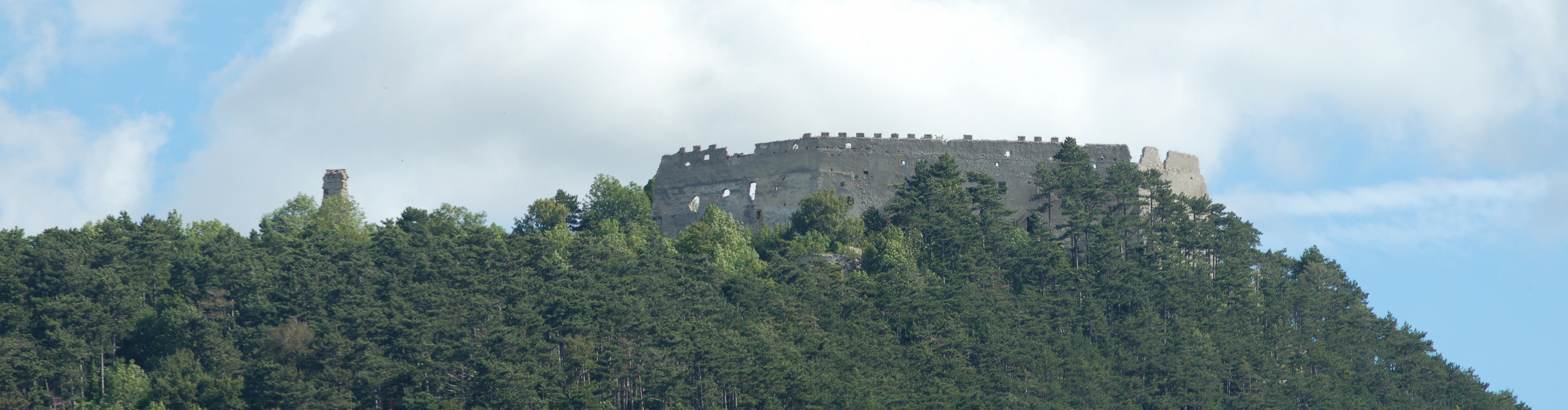
Castle Ruin Starhemberg, contemporary north elevation

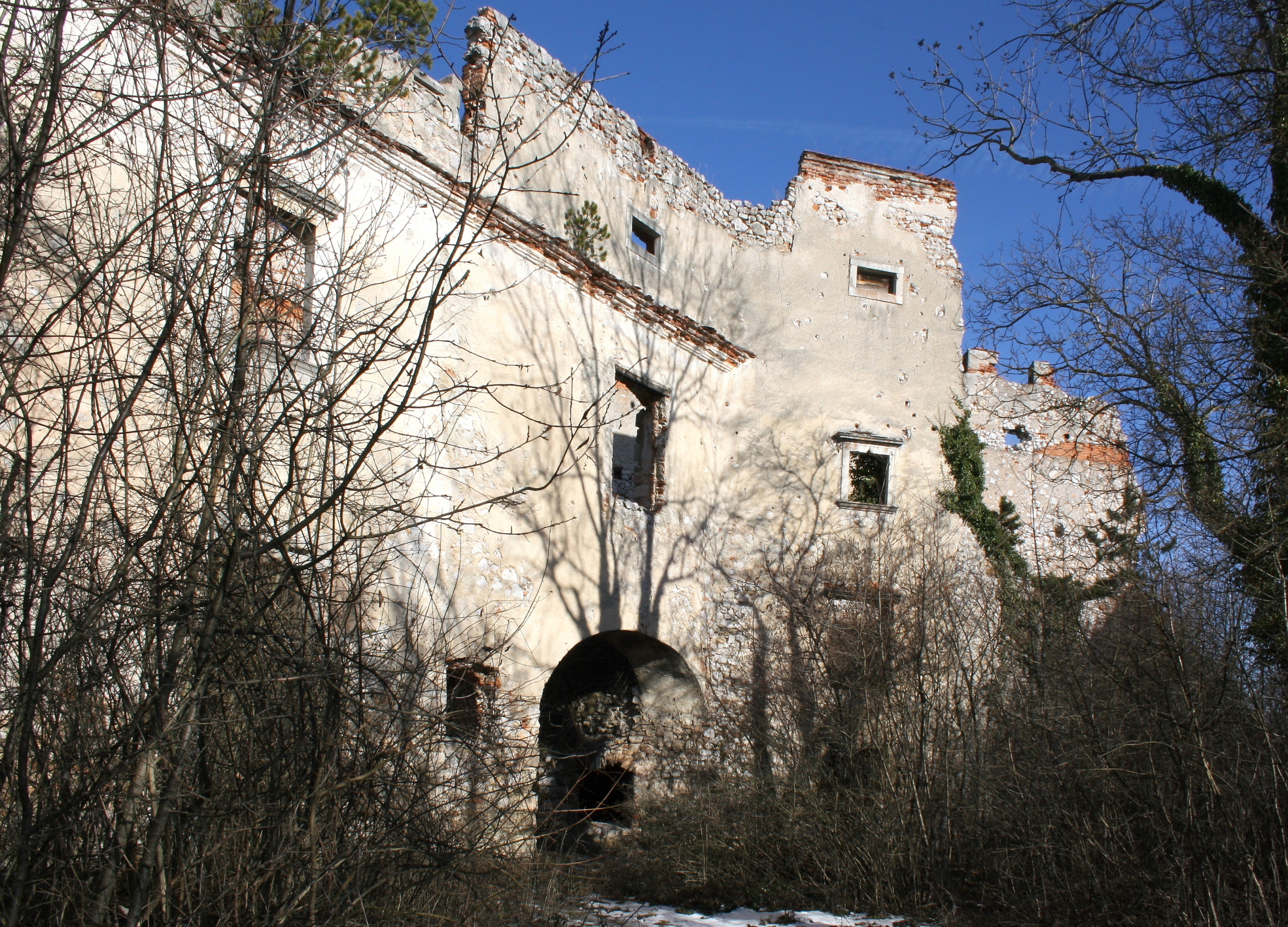
The inner bailey's southern walls
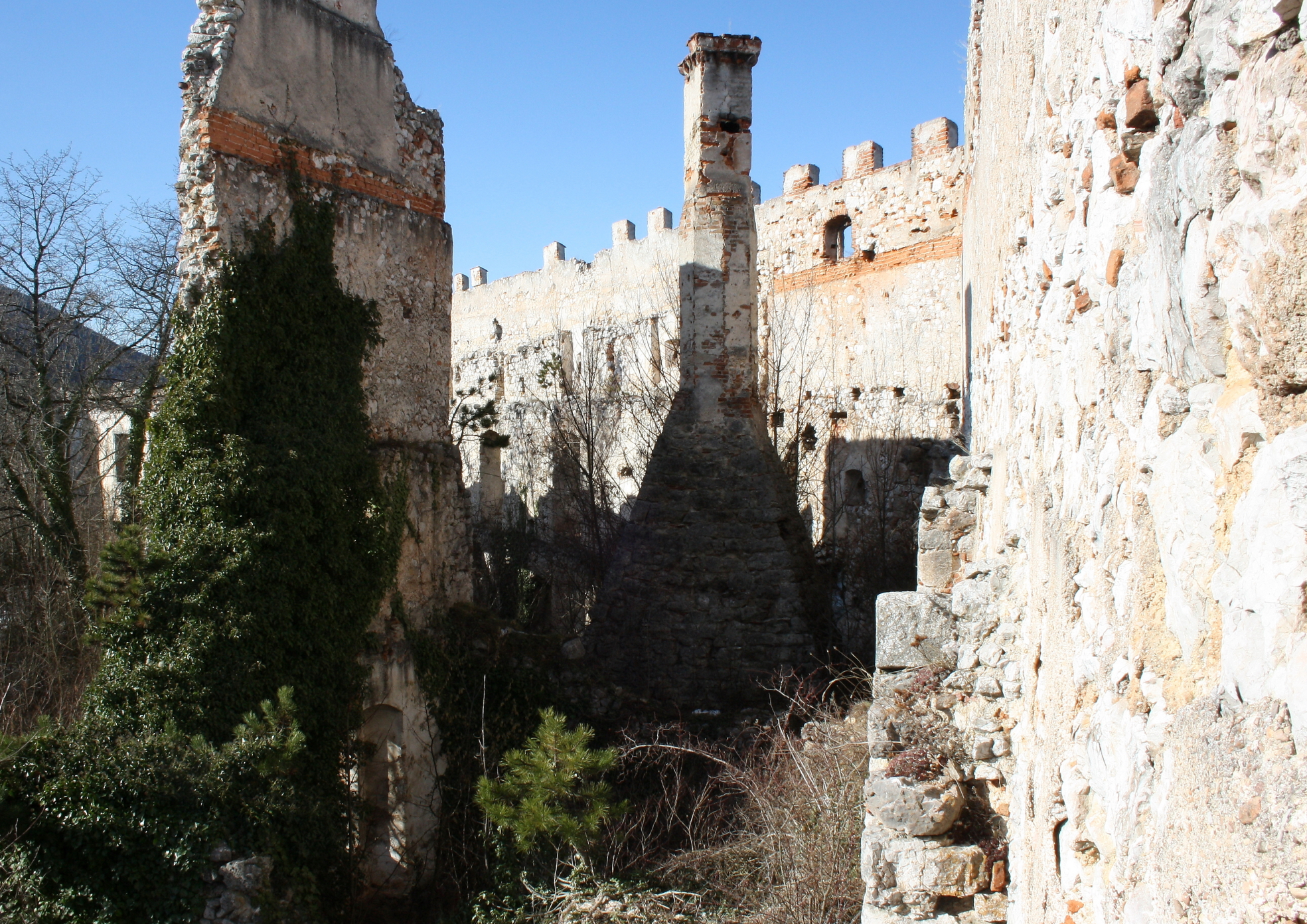
The castle's housing unit with domed kitchen funnel

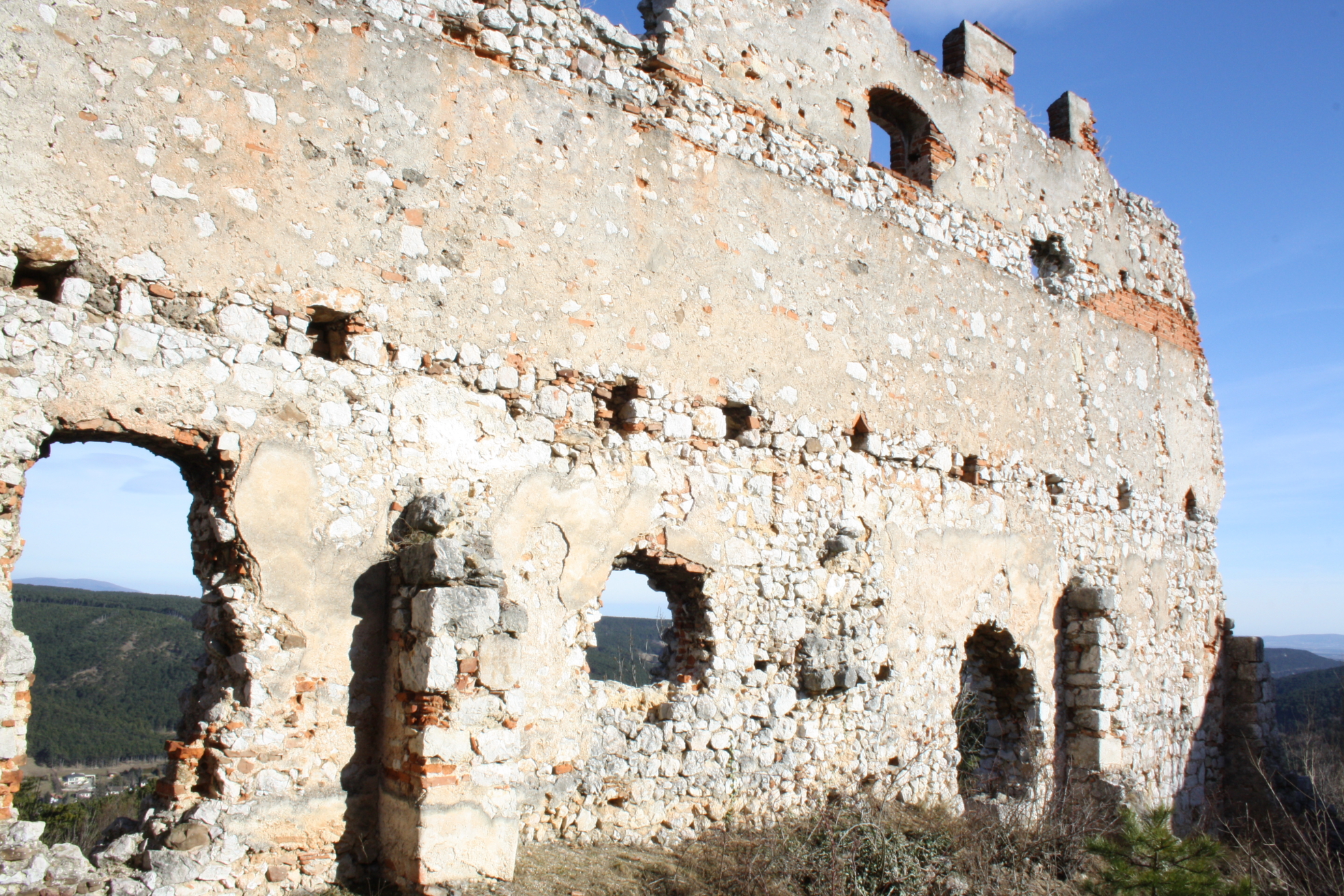
The housing unit's north-eastern wall

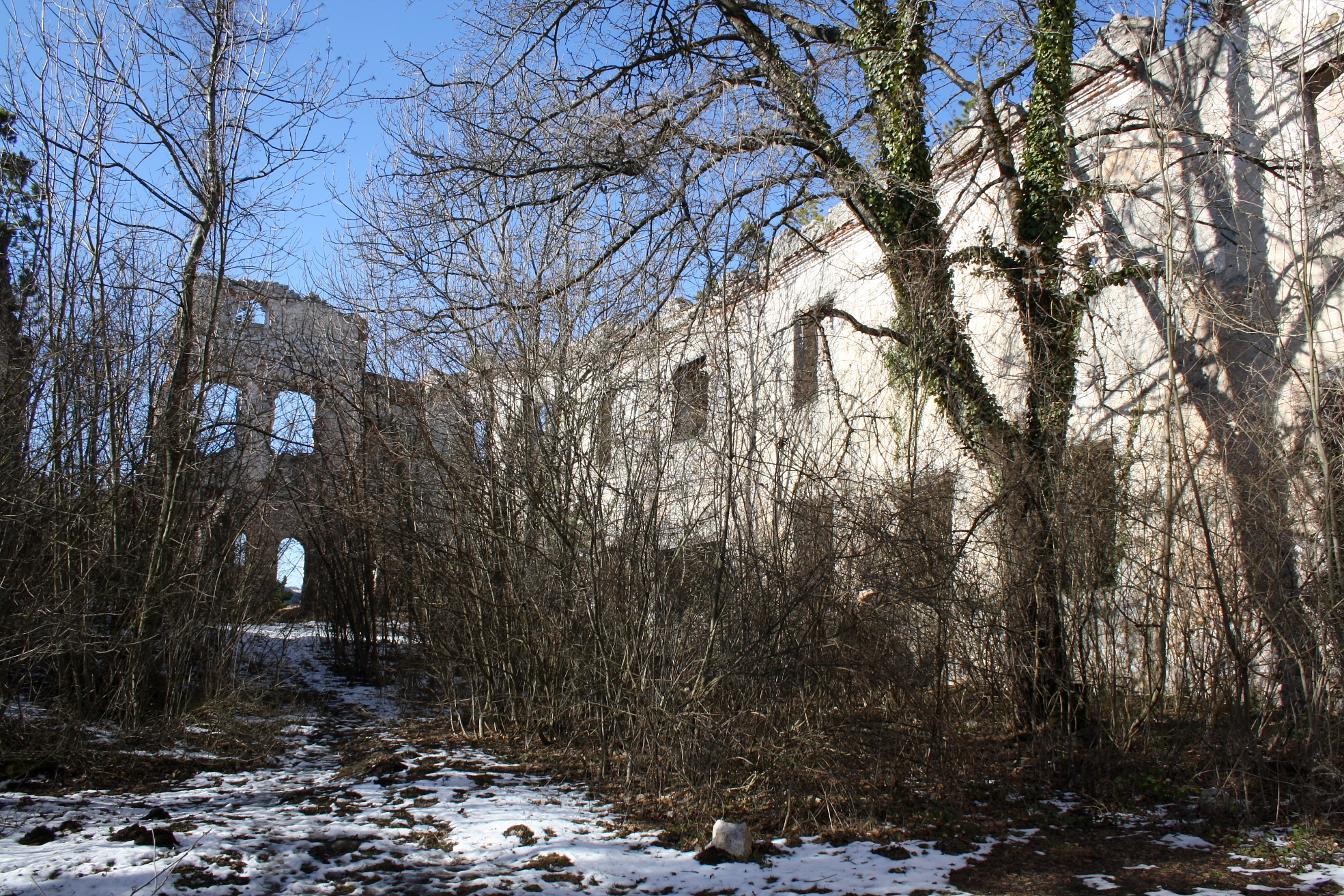
The castles's inner bailey, view westward

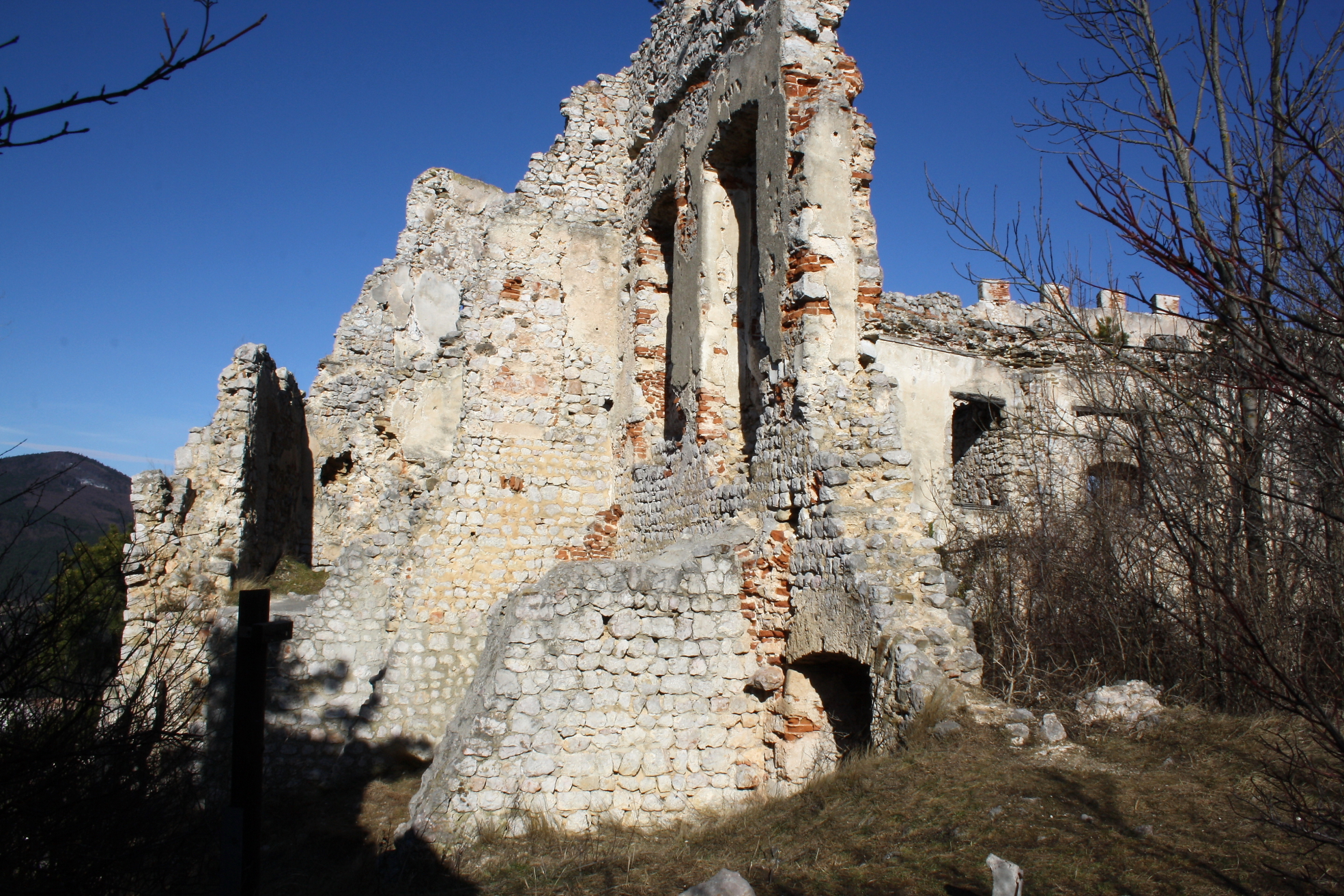
The castle's western walls, view northward

== See also ==
- List of castles in Austria
