= Giovanni Maria Luffoli =

Italian painter

Giovanni Maria Luffoli (1632 – 1690 or after 1707) was an Italian painter of the Baroque period active in Pesaro. He was a pupil of Simone Cantarini, and mainly active in Pesaro from 1665 to 1707.
