= Castelino =

Castelino is a surname. Notable people with the surname include:

- Janalynn Castelino (born 1998), Indian-Italian pop singer, songwriter and doctor
- Adline Castelino (born 1998), Miss India 2020 and Miss Universe 2020 runner up
- Monica Castelino (born 1982), Indian film actress

== See also ==
- Castellino
