= Giovanni Battista Venanzi =

Italian painter

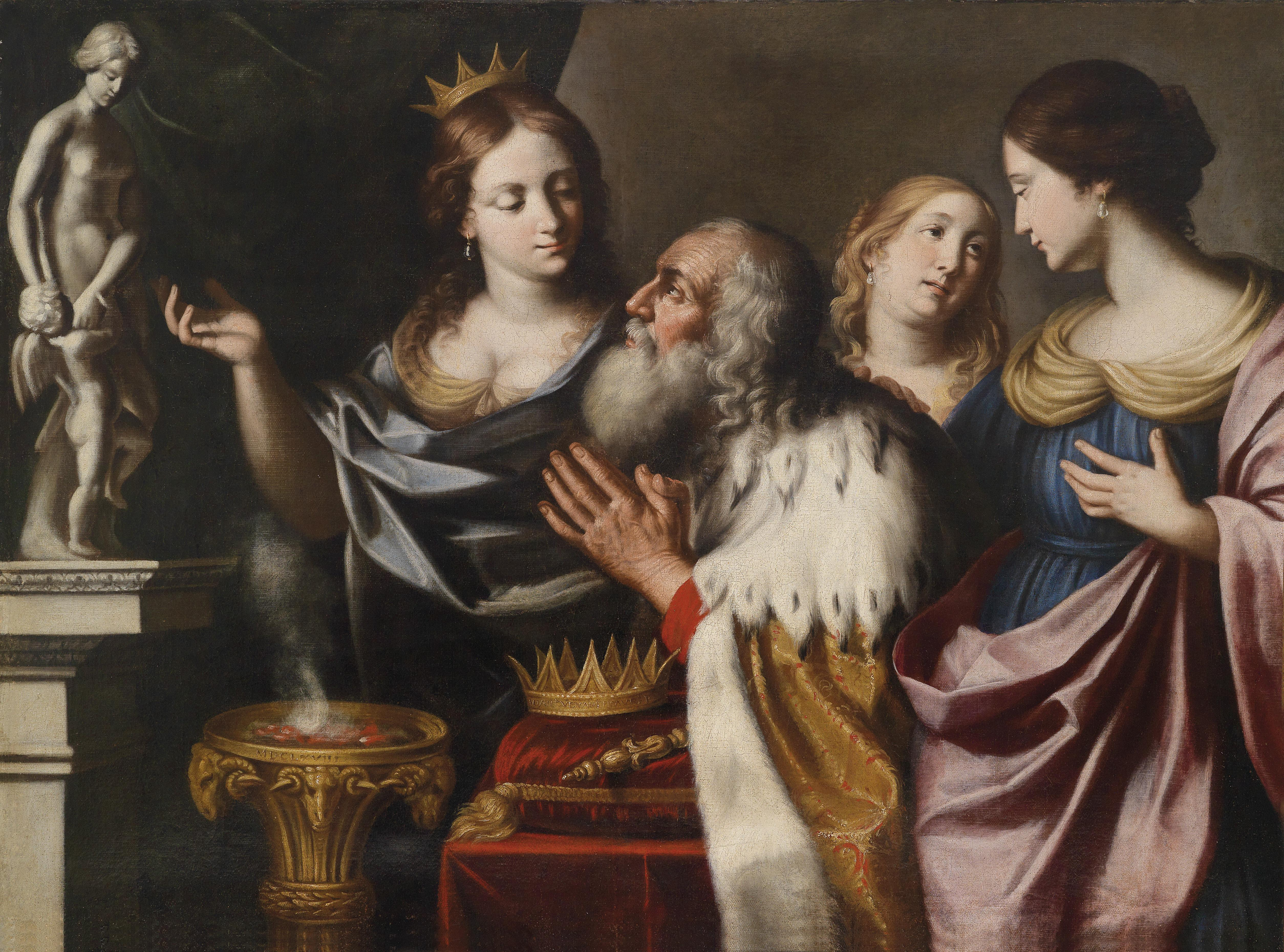
Depiction by Giovanni Battista Venanzi of King Solomon being led astray into idolatry in his old age by his wives, 1668.

Giovanni Battista Venanzi (born 1628) was an Italian painter of the Baroque period.

Born in Pesaro, his first training was with Guido Reni in Bologna, then Simone Cantarini, then Benedetto Gennari. He painted a Descent of the Holy Ghost for the church of Saints Gervasius and Protasius in Bologna. He painted a Life of San Antonio for the church of San Antonio at Pesaro.
