= Andries Jacobsz Stock =

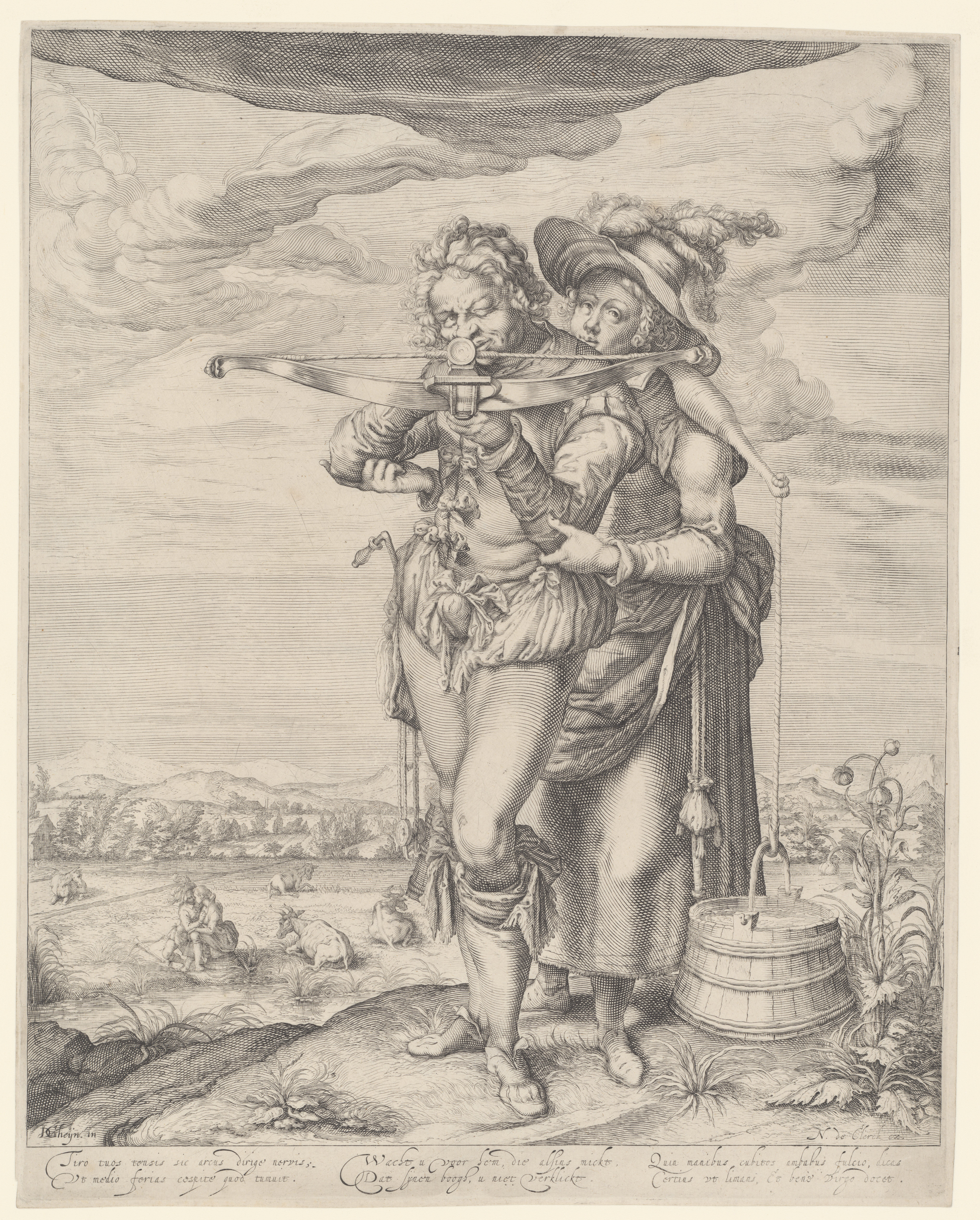
Archer and milkmaid, after a design by Jacob de Gheyn II

Andries Jacobsz Stock (1580–after 1648) was an engraver, printmaker, publisher and illustrator who was active for most of his career in The Hague in the Dutch Republic.

== Life ==
Stock may have been born in Antwerp as a document testifies that he inherited property in Antwerp from his mother in 1648. There is no further evidence for his birthplace. During his entire documented career he seems to have been active in The Hague. He registered there in the Guild of Saint Luke as a master engraver on 9 October 1613. He is mentioned for the last time (as far as known) in an archival document dated 22 August 1648. At that time he was citizen of The Hague.

The date and place of his death are unknown.

== Work ==
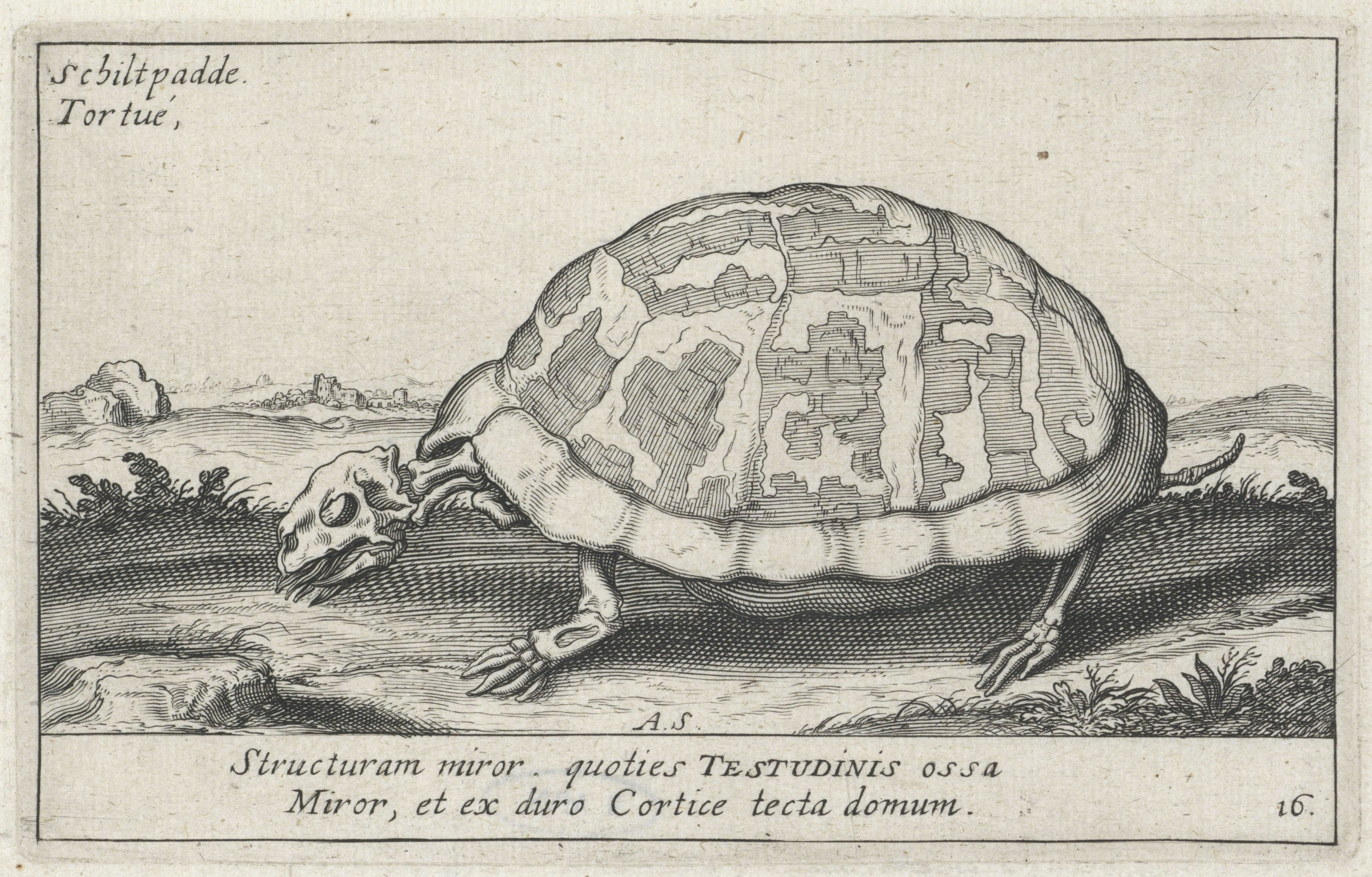
Skeleton of a turtle, after a design by Hendrick Hondius (I)

He is known for title pages, portrait prints, reproductive engravings and illustrations. To Stock have been attributed various anonymous engravings after designs by Jacob de Gheyn II after the latter had stopped engraving himself by 1600. He engraved various illustration for Hendrik Hondius I's publications including the Pictorum aliquot celebrium praecipue Germaniae Inferioris effigies (Effigies of some celebrated painters, chiefly of Lower Germany) published in The Hague in 1610.
