= Georg Matthäus Vischer =

Austrian engraver (1628–1696)

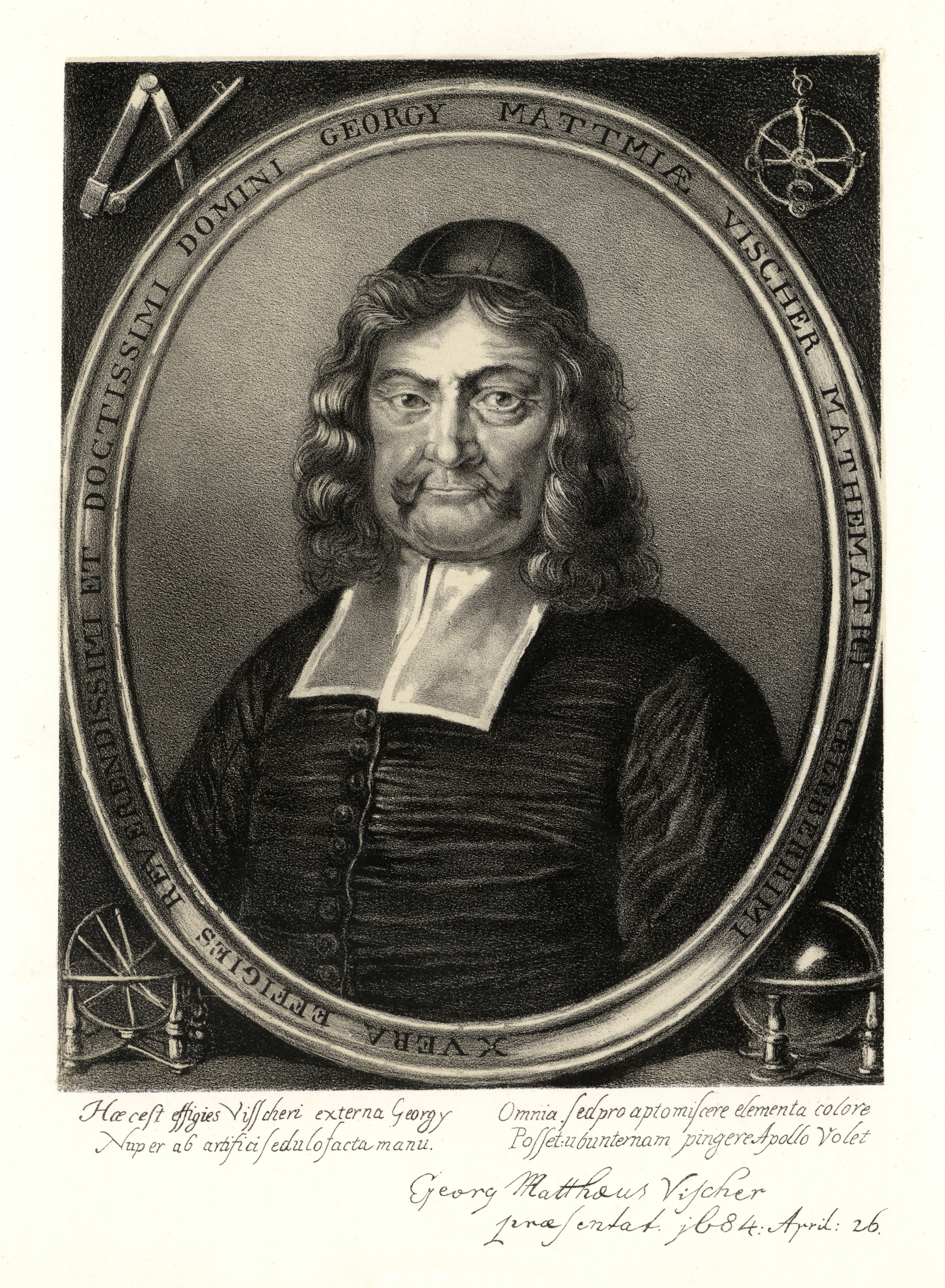
Georg Matthäus Vischer

Georg Matthäus Vischer (22 April 1628 – 13 December 1696) was an Austrian topographer, cartographer, engraver and parish priest in Leonstein (Upper Austria) and Vienna.

Vischer was born in Wenns (Tyrol). Despite his clerical vocation, geography and topographical surveys were Vischer's true calling. On behalf of nobility and clergy he compiled maps and created engravings and drawings of more than 1000 cities, castles, manors, abbeys and cloisters in the regions of Lower Austria, Upper Austria, Upper Styria, Lower Styria, Moravia and Hungary. In most cases Vischer's engravings are amongst the oldest preserved depictions of these structures. He is regarded as one of the most important Austrian cartographers and topographers of his time. He died, aged 68, in Linz (Upper Austria).

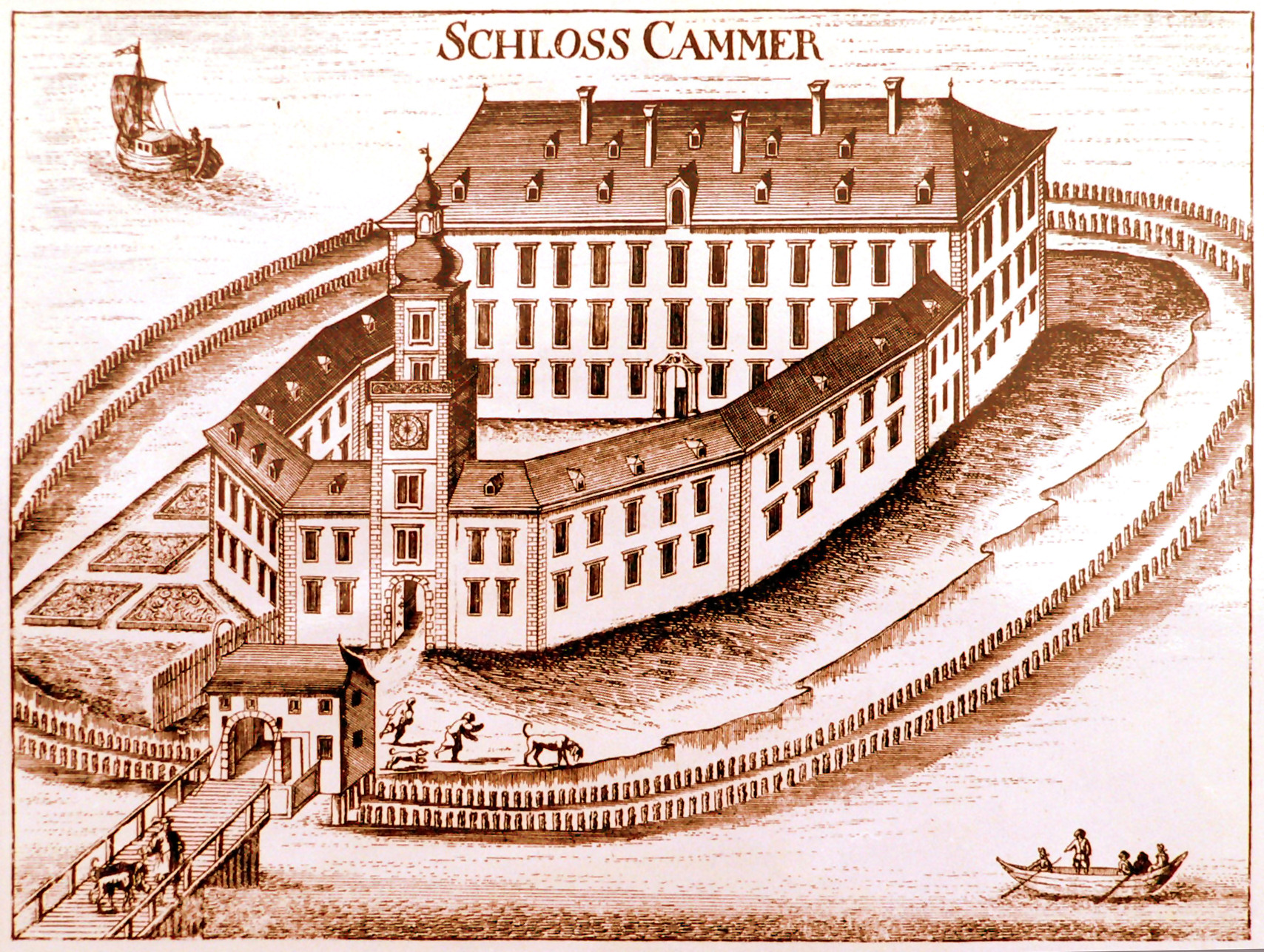
Characteristic Vischer-Engraving of Kammer Castle on Lake Attersee, 1672

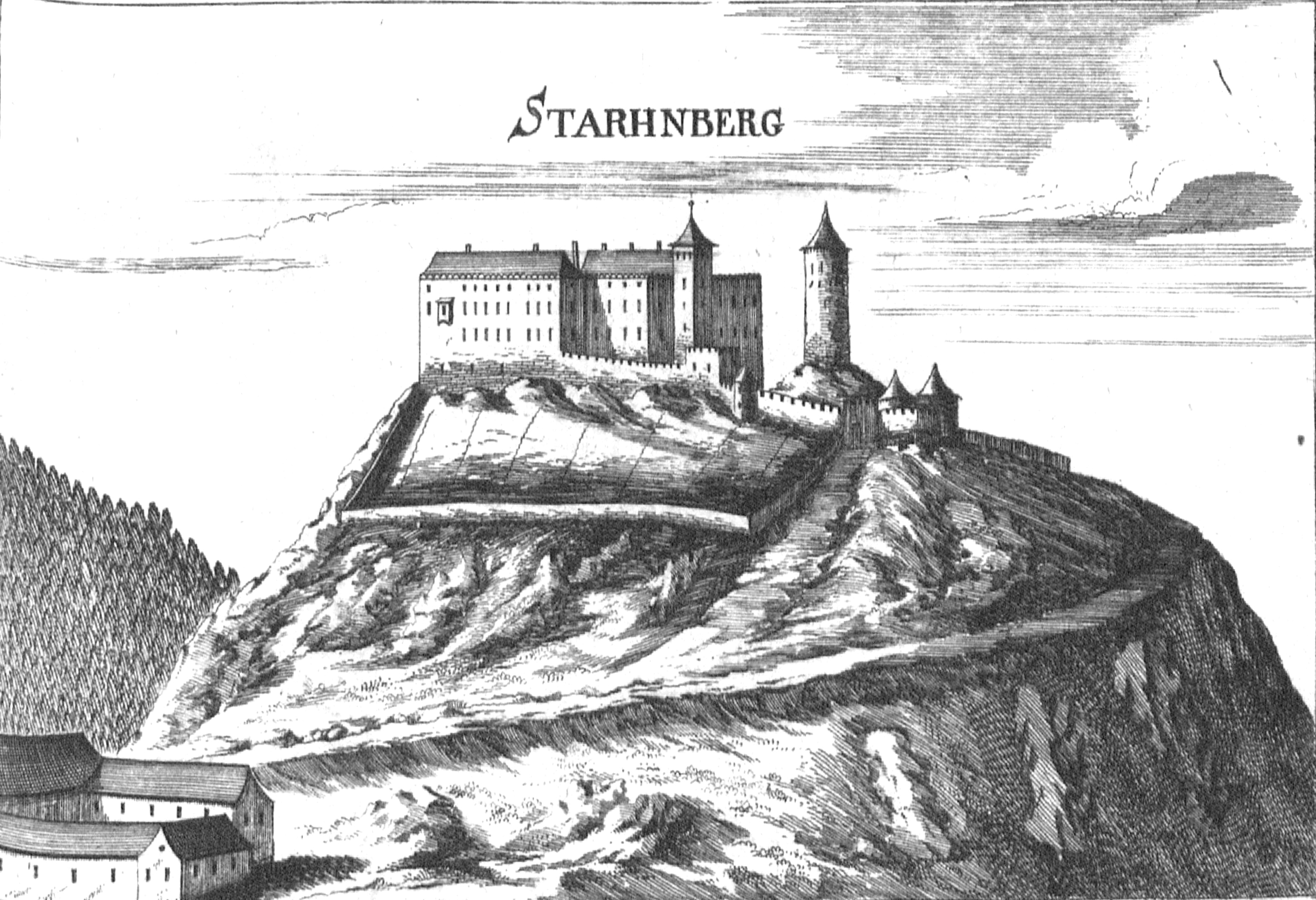
Copper engraving of Starhemberg Castle, 1672

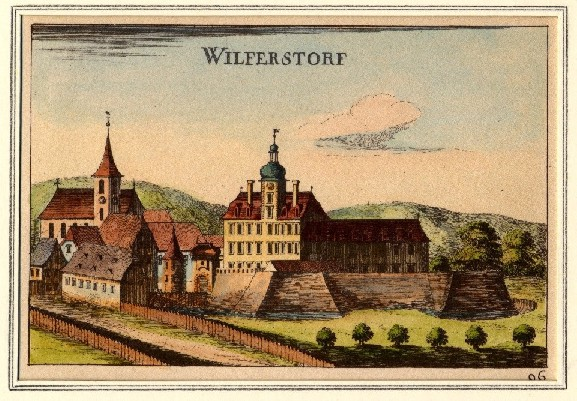
Illuminated engraving of Wilfersdorf Castle, 1674

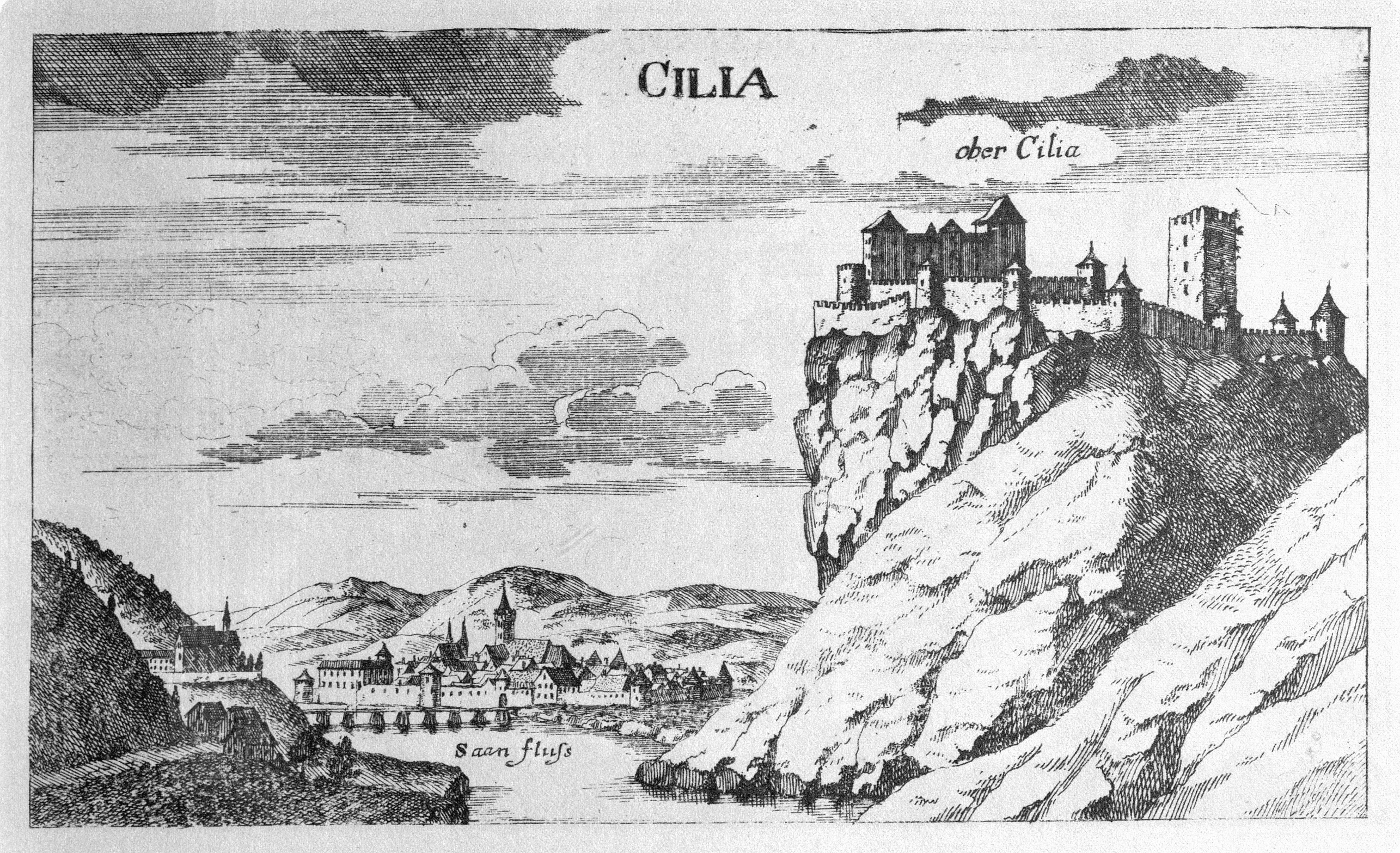
Celje, Topographia Ducatus Stiriae, Graz 1681

== Works ==
- Archiducatus Austriae Superioris Descriptio facta Anno 1667. A Map of Upper Austria.
- Archiducatus Austriae Inferioris Accuratissima Geographica Descriptio. A Map of Lower Austria, Vienna 1670
- Topographia Austriae superioris modernae. Copper Engravings of Upper Austrian Castles and Mansions (1674)
- Archiducatus Austriae Inferioris Geographica et Noviter Emendata Accuratissima Descriptio, Vienna 1697
- Topographia archiducatus Austriae Inferioris modernae 1672, Vienna 1672
- Topographia Ducatus Stiriae, Graz 1681
