= Luca Ciamberlano =

Italian painter

- Saint Thomas, 1606, New York, Metropolitan Museum of Art
- Born: c. 1580; Urbino, Duchy of Urbino
- Died: 1641; Rome, Papal States
- Known for: Painting; Engraving
- Movement: Baroque

Luca Ciamberlano (born c. 1580) was an Italian painter and engraver of the Baroque period.

== Biography ==
Luca Ciamberlano was born in Urbino around 1580. In the early part of his life he applied himself to the study of civil law, in which he had taken a doctor's degree, when he abandoned the study of jurisprudence to devote himself to painting and engraving, particularly the latter. He became the leading graphic artist of his day.

From 1599 to 1641 he resided at Rome, where he executed a great number of plates from his own designs, as well as after the works of the most celebrated Italian painters, in the style of Agostino Carracci. He codified and engraved Carracci's teaching system in a work published in Rome in 1626 by Pietro Stefanoni, called Scuola perfetta per imparare a disegnare tutto il corpo umano.

Ciamberlano collaborated with Guido Reni between 1610 and 1612, when he made engravings based on Reni's drawings of the Life of St Philip. He engraved the anatomical drawings of Pietro da Cortona between 1618 and 1620. He created a nine-part series of engravings depicting the Passion of Christ, dated 1621 and probably published by Johannes Eillarts.

Of his plates, 114 are known, but as many as 331 have been conjectured. They were entirely executed with the graver, which he handled with neatness and intelligence; his drawing of the figure is tolerably correct. He sometimes signed his plates with his name, and sometimes marked them with the cipher LC. Among them are the following:

- Thirteen plates of Christ and the twelve Apostles; after Raphael.
- St. Jerome dead, lying upon a stone; after the same. (pictured)
- St. Thomas; after Bassano.
- Nine plates of Angels carrying the instruments of the Passion.
- Duke Francesco Maria II of Urbino.
- Christ on the Mount of Olives; after Alessandro Casolani.
- Christ appearing to Mary Magdalen; after Federico Barocci. 1609.
- Christ appearing to St. Theresa; after Carracci.
