= Diego de Leyva =

Spanish painter

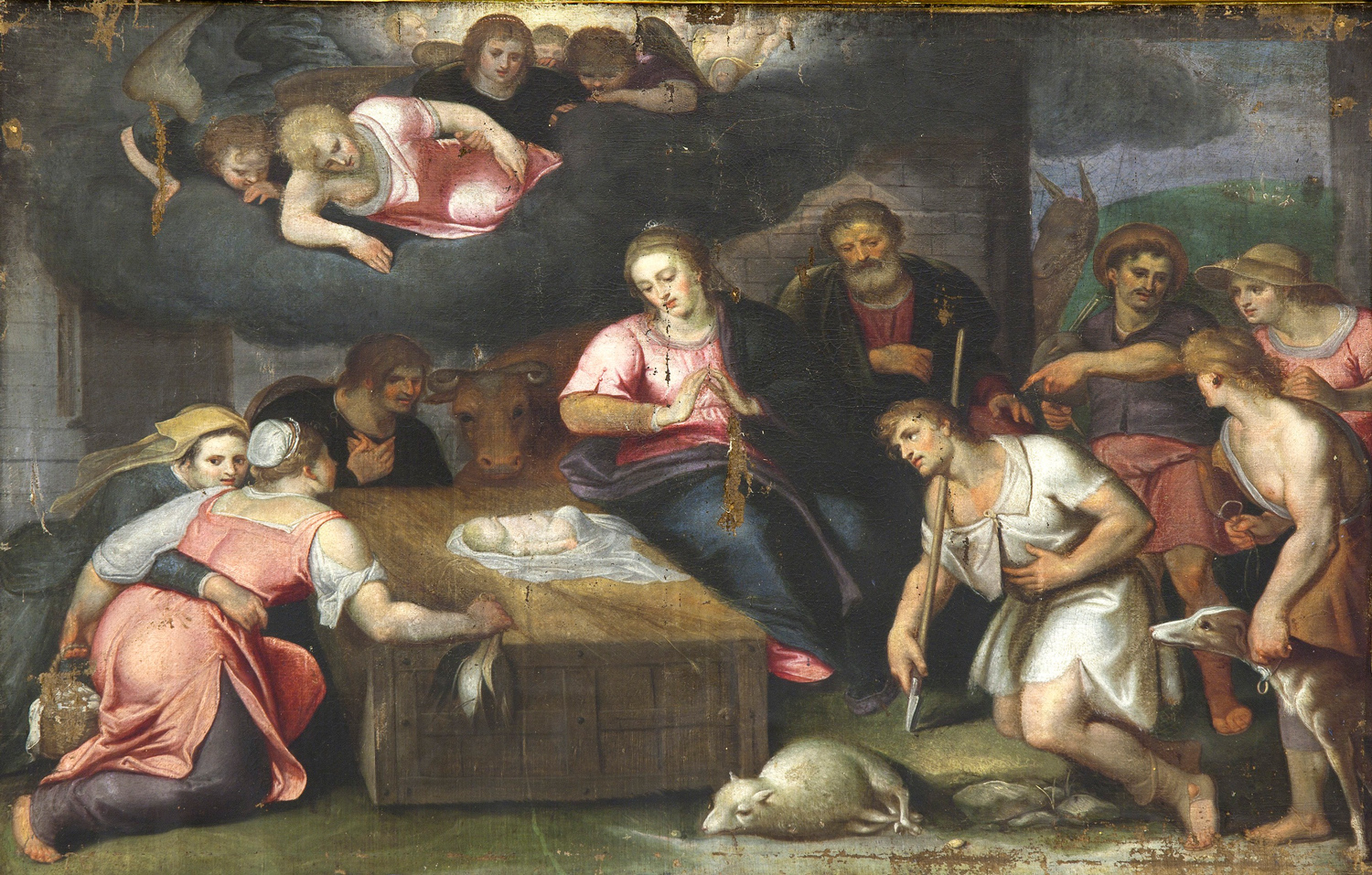
Adoration of the Shepherds

"Diego de Leyva" is also the name of a Spanish governor of Melilla.

Diego de Leyva (c. 1580–1637) was a Spanish painter. He was born at Haro in La Rioja. He is supposed to have spent his youth at Rome, and returned to Spain a painter, and settled at Burgos. In 1628 he was commissioned by the Chapter of Burgos to paint the portraits of certain dignitaries for the chapel of St. Catalina in the cathedral, and for the chapel of the Virgin he painted a picture of the Presentation.

In 1633 he retired to the Carthusian monastery of Miraflores, where in 1634 he took the final vows, and devoted himself to the performance of his duties, and the production of religious pictures, among which were fifteen large canvases on the life of Bruno of Cologne, eleven martyrdoms, ten pictures of saints of the Carthusian Order, a Crucifixion, and some pictures of the Virgin Mary. He died at Miradores.
