= Herman van Aldewereld =

Dutch painter

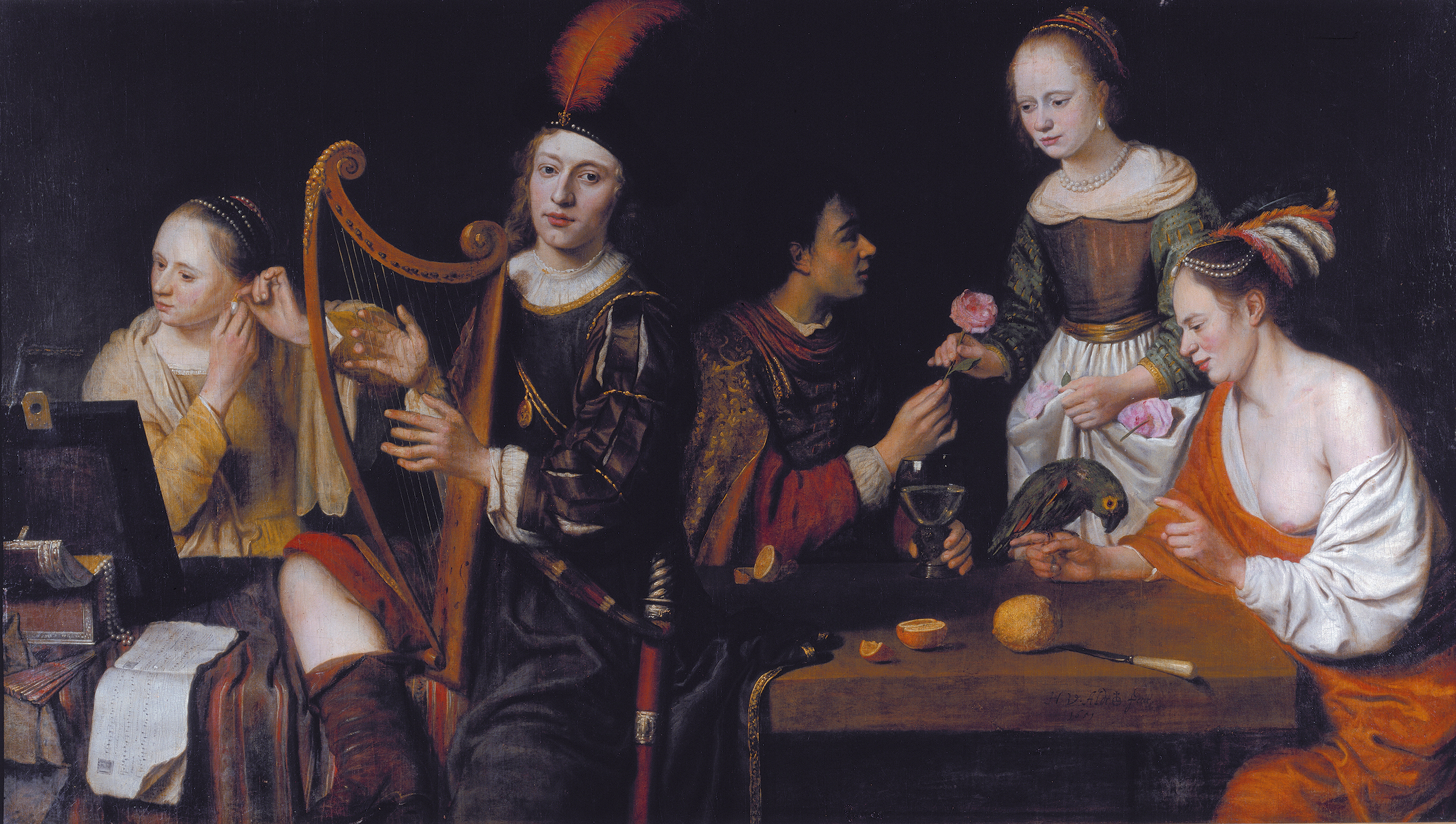
Allegory on the five senses (1651)

Herman van Aldewereld (1628/29 in Amsterdam – buried 17 July 1669, in Nieuwe Kerk (Amsterdam)), a Dutch painter, was chiefly engaged in painting portraits, generally of celebrated personages, several of which have been engraved. He occasionally painted genre pictures. He is frequently called in error, H. van Aide, because he was accustomed to sign his name H. van Alde, with the addition of a sketch of a world, which was overlooked. The latter part of his last name, -wereld, means 'world' in Dutch, hence the drawing of a world.
