= Giovanni Stefano Robatto =

Italian painter (1649–1733)

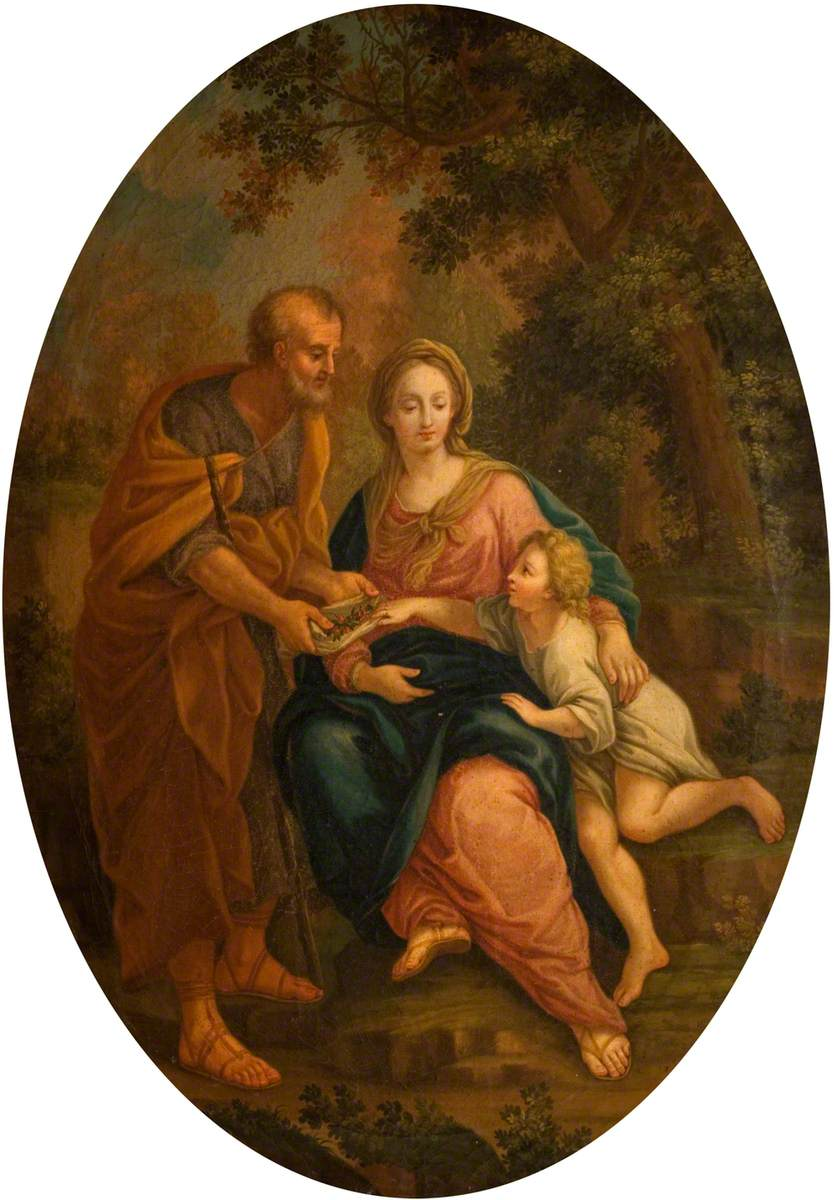
The Holy Family, c. 1680, Birmingham Museums Trust

Giovanni Stefano Robatto (1649 – 6 October 1731) was an Italian painter of the Baroque period.

== Biography ==
He was born at Savona, Republic of Genoa. he studied at Rome under Carlo Maratta. He was employed painting for churches in Genoa, among his works, a St. Francis receiving the Stigmata for the church of the Cappucini. He afterwards abandoned himself to a fatal passion for gaming, and his later works are hasty and careless.
