= Baltazar Kuncz =

Polish sculptor and woodcarver

Baltazar Kuncz (1580-1650) was a Polish sculptor and woodcarver.

Kuncz built and decorated altarpieces in Kraków. An altar in the church of St. Mark (1618-1622), the altar in the church of the Holy Cross, and the altar of St. Anne in the Corpus Christi Basilica in Kazimierz are all attributed to him. He was part of the local artist guild, and is known to have had a workshop in Kleparz.

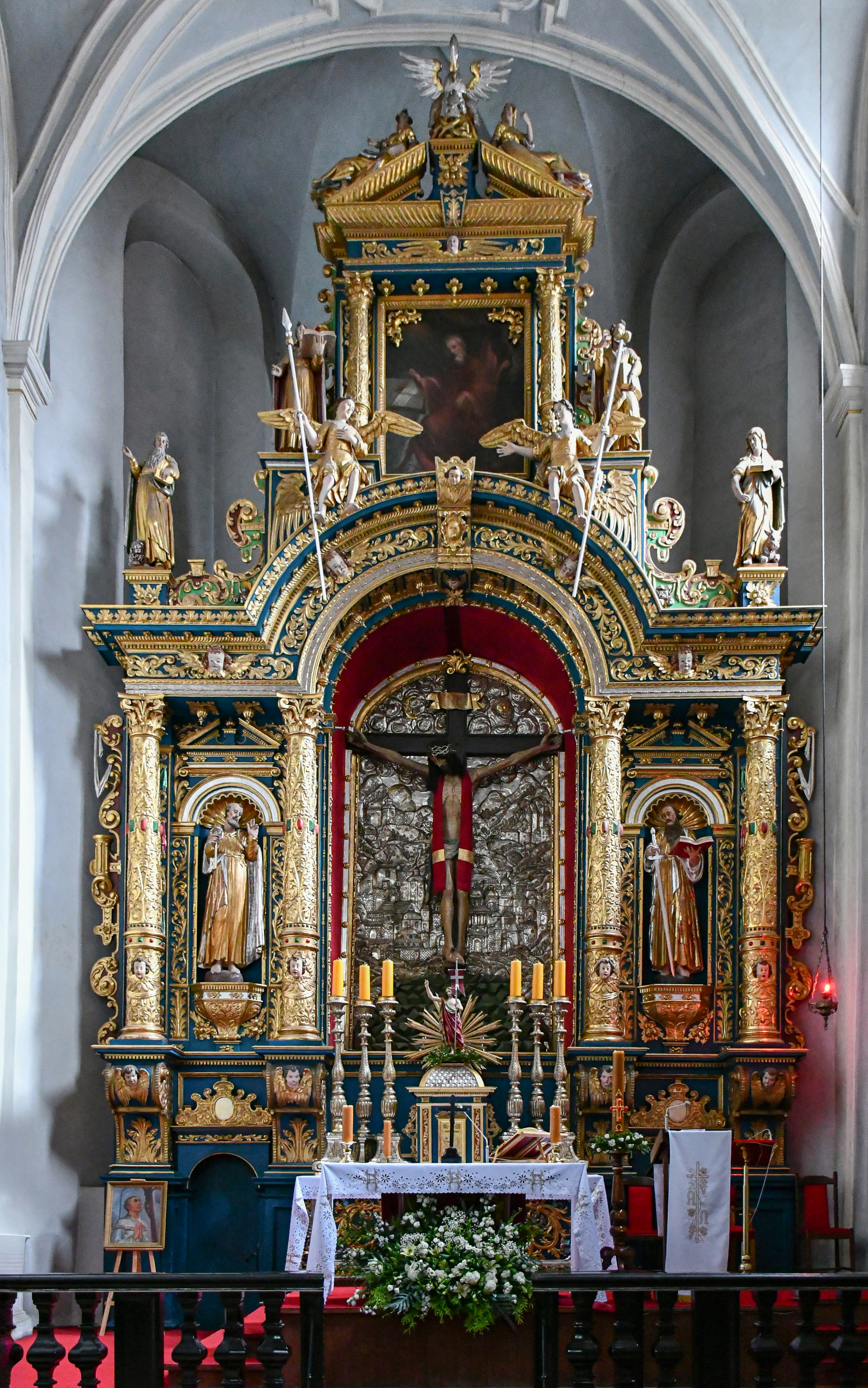
Main altar
Church of St. Mark, Kraków

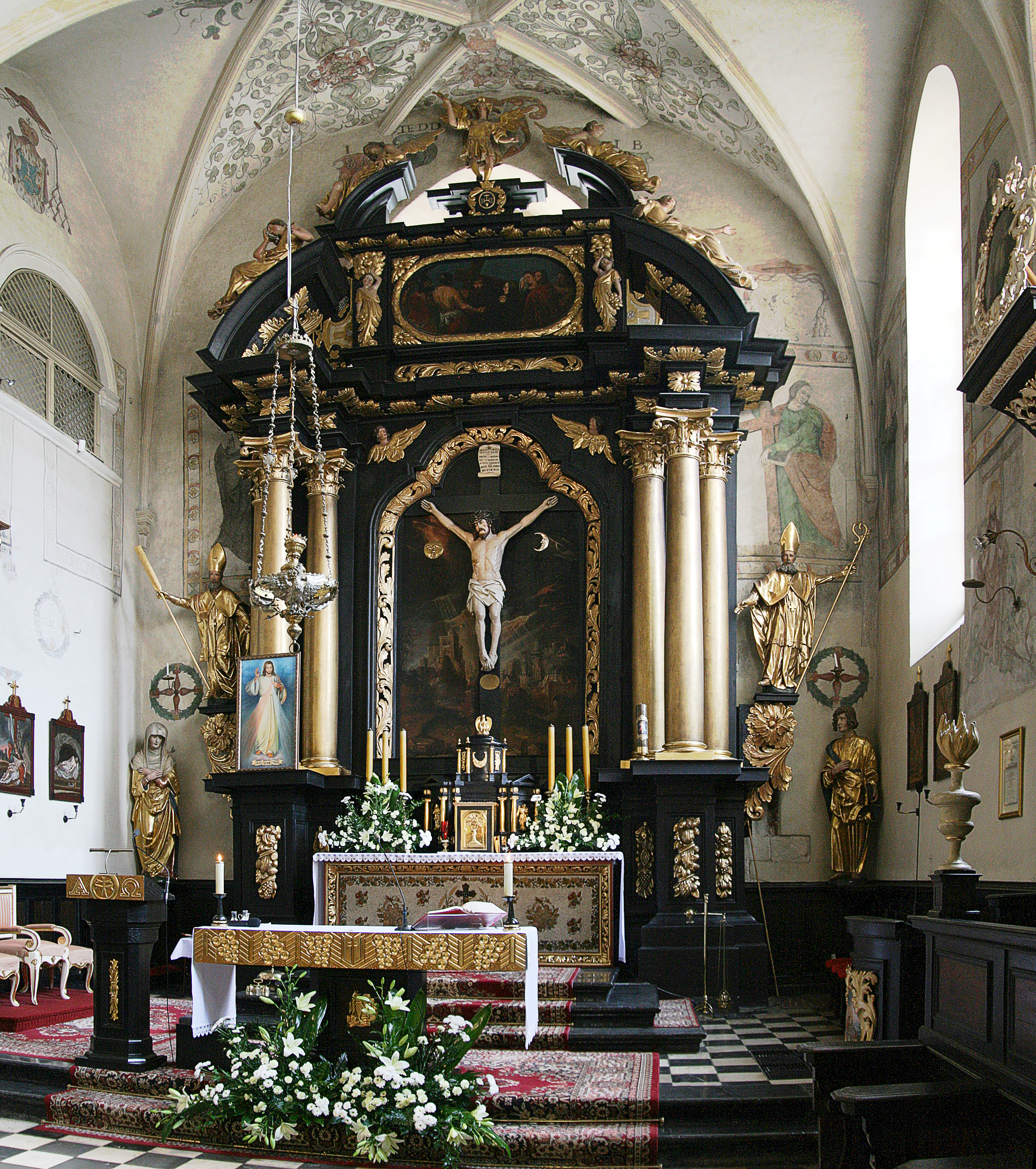
Main altar
Church of the Holy Cross, Kraków
