= Giacomo Locatelli =

Italian painter

Giacomo Locatelli (or Lucatelli; 1580–1628) was an Italian painter. Other authors call him Girolamo Locatelli.

== Biography ==
While born at Verona, he studied in Bologna under Guido Reni and Francesco Albani. Among his works are two pictures in the church of San Fermo Maggiore at Verona, for the church of Santa Maria in Organo, and for the Chapel of the Madonna in San Procolo.
