= Castellino Castello =

Italian painter

Castellino Castello (1580–1649) was an Italian painter of the Baroque period, active mainly in Genoa. He trained with Giovanni Battista Paggi.
