= Fig leaf =

Artistic or metaphorical censorship practice

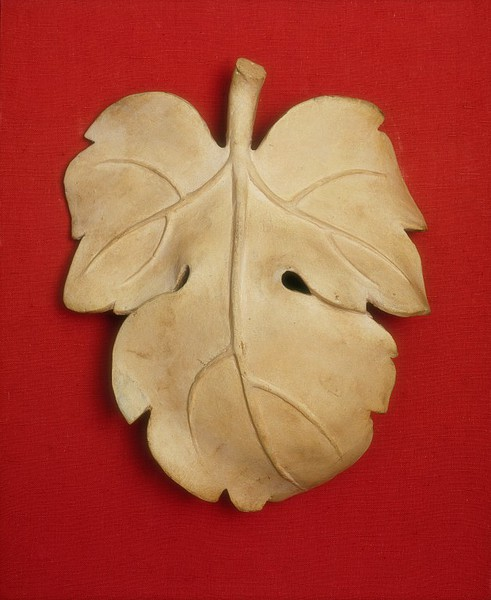
A fig leaf cast in plaster used to cover the genitals of a copy of a statue of David in the Cast Courts of the Victoria and Albert Museum. Today, the fig leaf is no longer used, but it is displayed in a case at the back of the cast's plinth.

"Fig leaf" is an idiom for obscuring an act or object considered embarrassing or distasteful with something of innocuous appearance. The literal use of a fig leaf for this purpose originates in Western painting and sculpture, where leaves would be used by artists themselves or by later censors in order to hide the genitalia of a subject. Use of the fig plant in particular came about as a Biblical reference to the Book of Genesis, in which Adam and Eve used fig leaves to cover their nudity after eating the forbidden fruit from the tree of the knowledge of good and evil.

A "fig-leaf edition" of a work is known as an expurgation or Bowdlerization.

== History ==
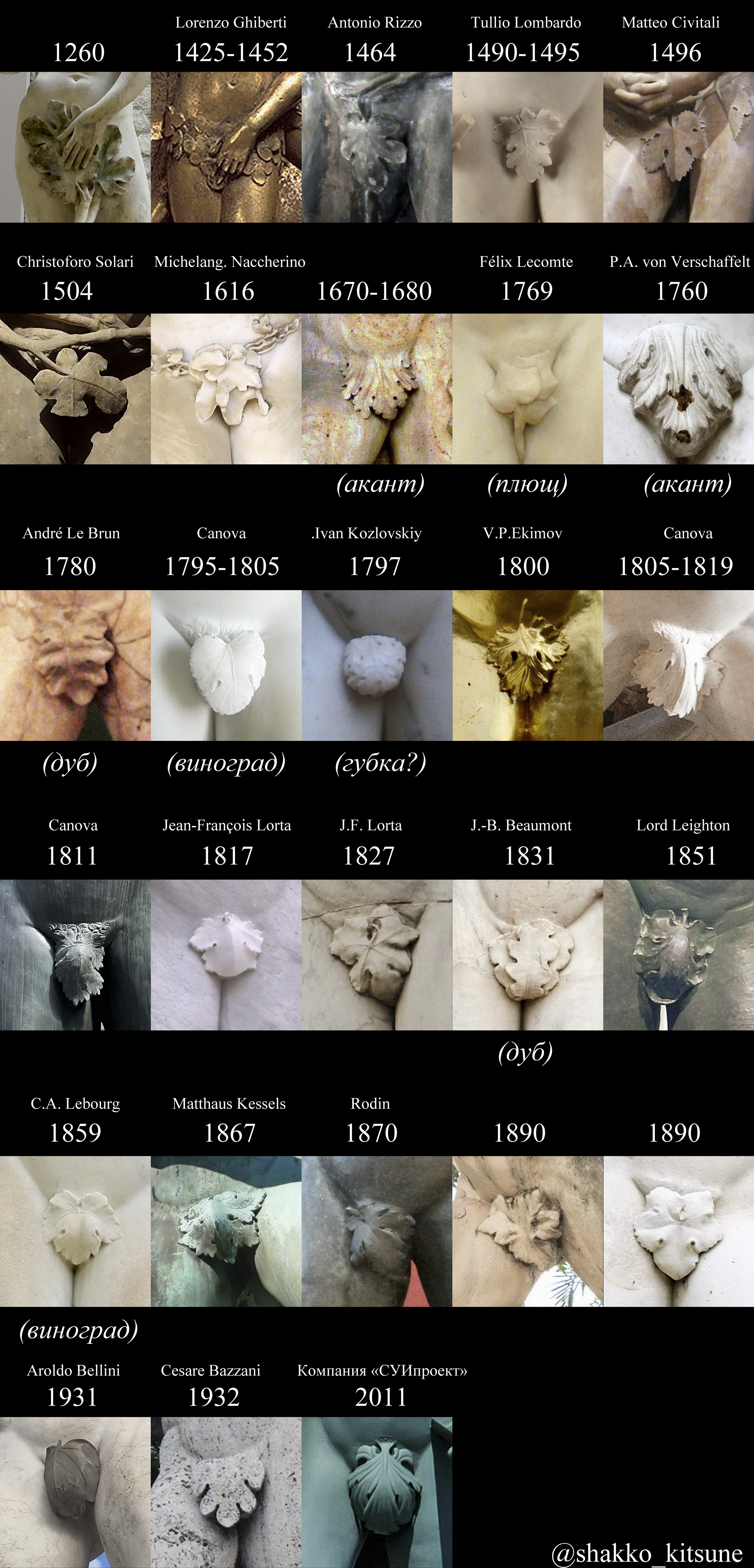
History of fig leaves in sculpture

Ancient Greek art was dominated by the tradition of heroic nudity and a more general normalization of male nakedness, including the genitals, although the female vulval area was generally covered in art for public display. This tradition continued in Ancient Roman art until the conversion of the Roman Empire to Christianity, when such practices vanished entirely. During the Middle Ages, only the unfortunate (most often the damned) were usually shown naked, although the depictions were then often rather explicit. Adam and Eve were often shown wearing fig or other leaves, following the Biblical description. This was especially a feature of Northern Renaissance art.

From about 1530, the growing response of the Catholic church to the Reformation ideologies that swept Europe and that led to the Council of Trent also led to a number of artworks, especially in churches or public places, being altered to reduce the amount of nudity on display. Often, as in the famous case of Michelangelo's The Last Judgment, drapery or extra branches from any nearby bush was used. This has been dubbed the "fig leaf campaign". For free-standing statues this did not work well, and carved or cast fig leaves were sometimes added, such as with the plaster copy of Michelangelo's David displayed in Victorian era London. In the reign of Queen Victoria, display of male nudity was contentious and the Queen herself was said to find it shocking. The museum commissioned this fig leaf and kept it in readiness in case of a visit by the Queen or other female dignitaries: the fig leaf was then hung on the figure using a pair of hooks. Historian Daniel J. Boorstin said that:

The age of the rising middle class in Victorian England was, of course, the age of the fig leaf. "The fig leaves of decent reticence" which Charles Kingsley described were applied not only to statuary but to literature as well.

The Adam and Eve panels on the Ghent Altarpiece, already equipped with fig leaves by Jan van Eyck, were simply replaced with 19th-century panels copying the figures but clothed. Many of these alterations have since been reversed, damaging some of the statues.

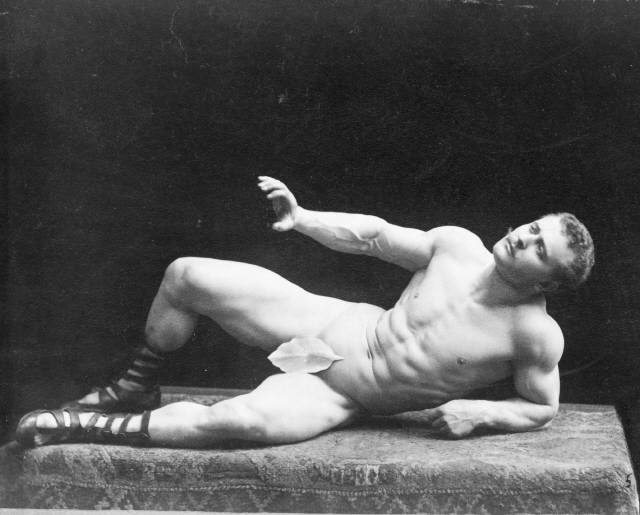
Bodybuilding pioneer Eugen Sandow portraying The Dying Gaul, a pose taken from an ancient Roman sculpture.

Eugen Sandow, often considered the first modern-day bodybuilder, was an admirer of the masculine physique, encapsulated in a Greco-Roman musculature he termed the Grecian Ideal. In addition to strongman sideshows, he performed "muscle displays" by posing in the nude—save for a fig leaf that he would don in further emulation of statues he described seeing in Italy as a boy.

== Modern era ==
The expression fig leaf has a pejorative metaphorical sense meaning a flimsy or minimal cover for anything or behaviour that might be considered shameful, with the implication that the cover is only a token gesture and the truth is obvious to all who choose to see it.

A metaphorical fig leaf is something visible but innocuous, as against a coverup in which the existence of something may be entirely hidden. In the context of negotiation, an offer might be characterized as a "fig leaf" if that offer is actually a ploy to conceal a sinister plan.

== In linguistics ==
In linguistics, a figleaf is defined as language used to prevent a bigoted statement from being perceived as bigoted, for example, that a person making a racist statement is not racist. The concept of a figleaf was created by Jennifer Saul, who coined "racial figleaves" and "gender figleaves", who says that they come from the social norms, "Don't be racist" and "Don't be sexist". Saul listed several types of figleaves, including denial, mention, and friendship figleaves.

Mentioning statistics can act as a figleaf. An example of this may include saying that "Black men are prone to criminal behaviour", followed by saying that they have a higher rate of incarceration.

A common instance of a racial figleaf is the statement "Black men are prone to criminal behaviour", followed by "But don’t get me wrong, some of my best friends are black", suggesting that one who says this cannot be racist if they have black friends, further suggesting that the listener is not racist if they believe, accept, and repeat this.

An example of a gender figleaf could be a person saying "Women are no good at math", following the statement with "In saying this, I want to make it clear that I have great respect for women". This suggests to the listener that the speaker is not sexist if they have respect for women, further suggesting that it would not be sexist for the listener to agree and repeat it.

== Gallery ==
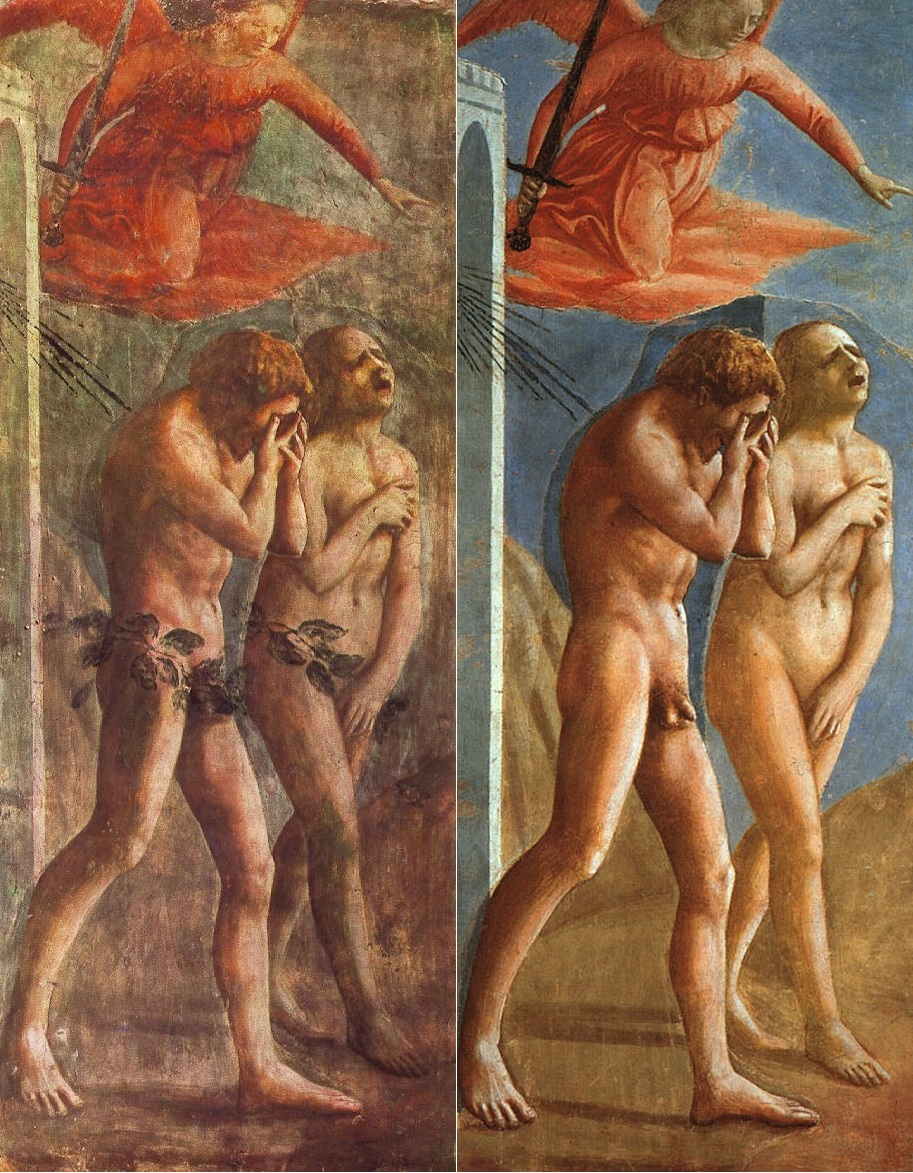
The Expulsion from the Garden of Eden, by Masaccio, before and after restoration. It was painted in 1425, covered up in 1680, and restored in 1980.

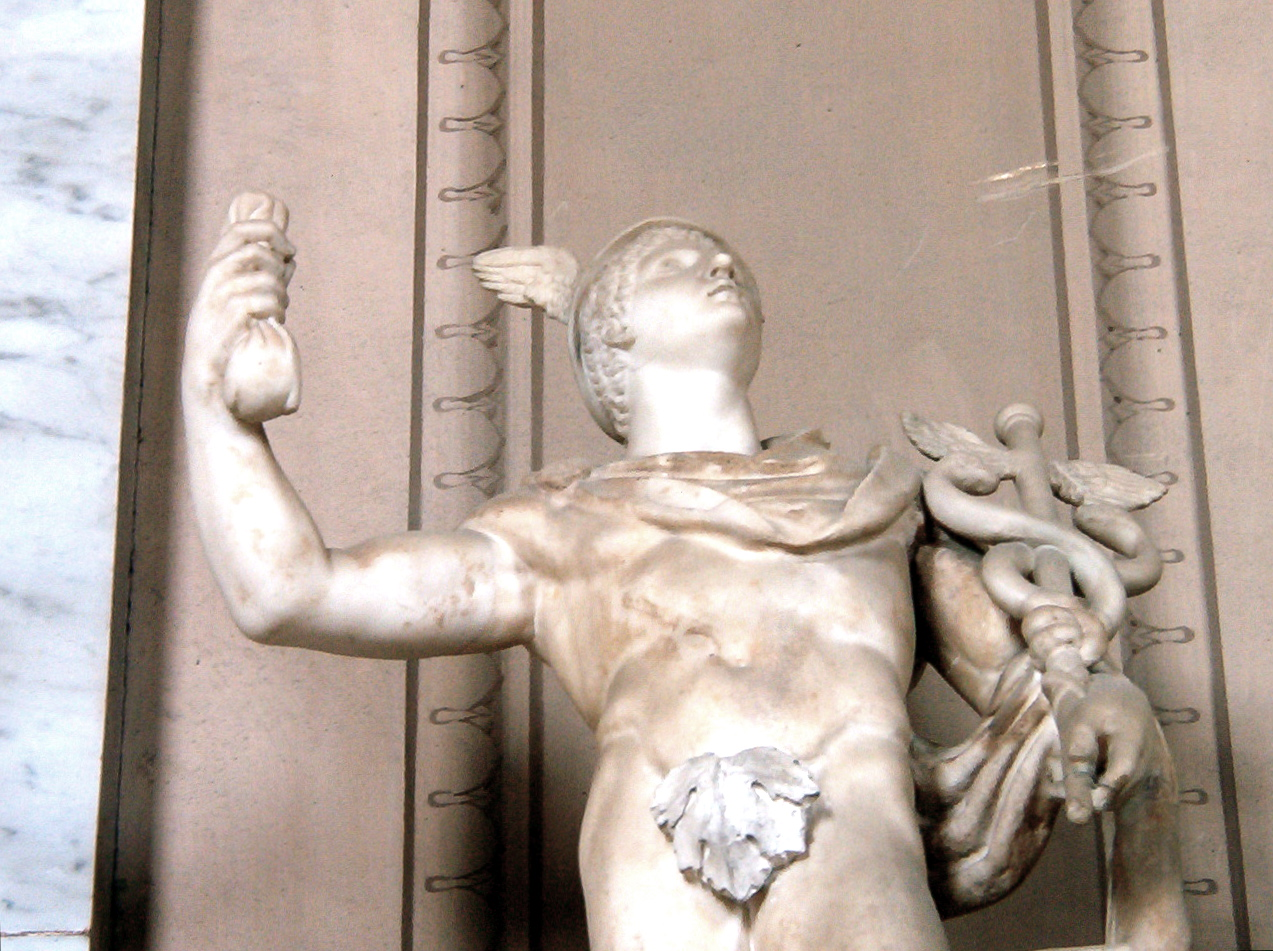
A statue of Mercury in the Vatican. The fig leaf was applied under the more "chaste" Popes; most such coverings were removed later.

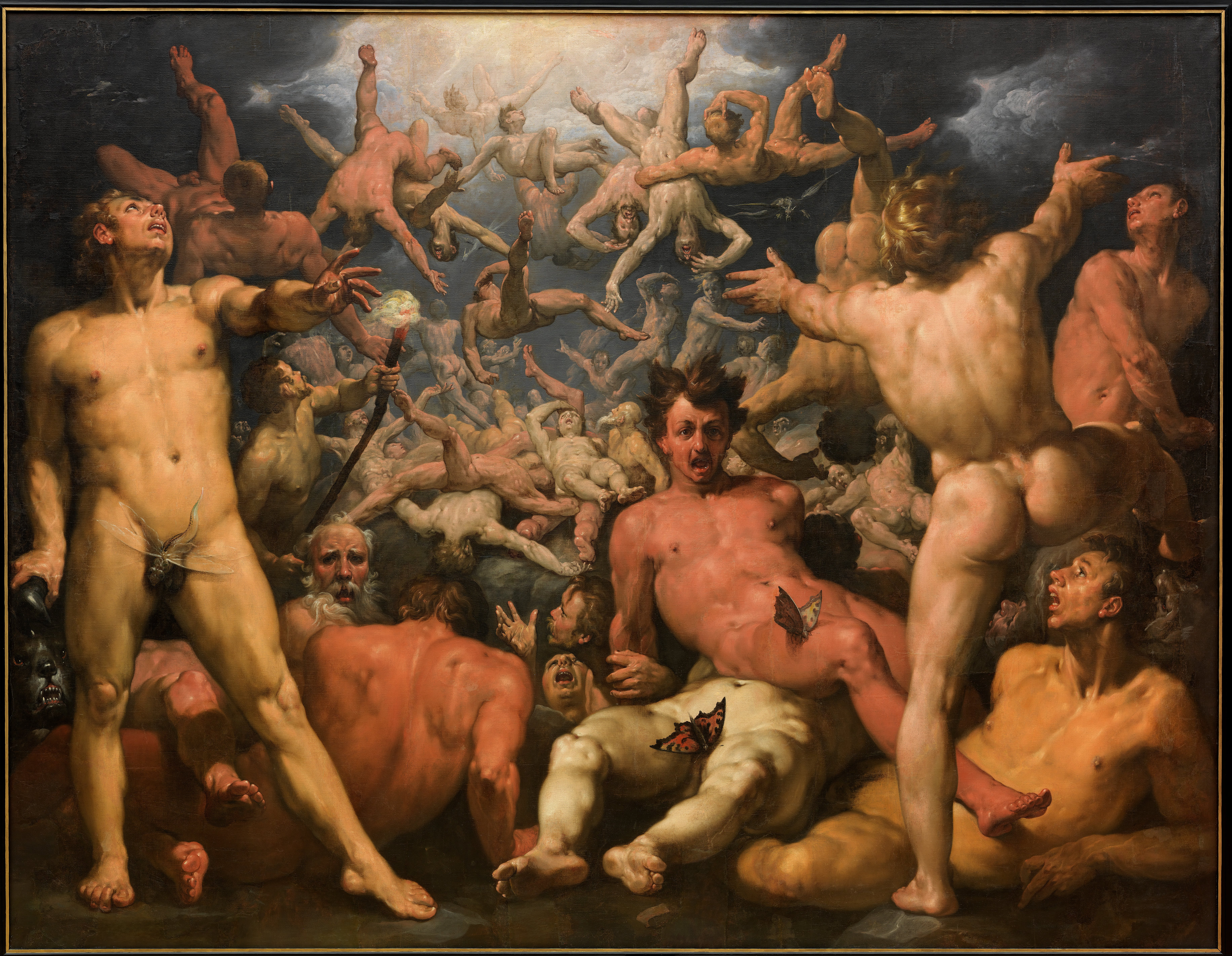
The Fall of the Titans by Cornelis Cornelisz. van Haarlem

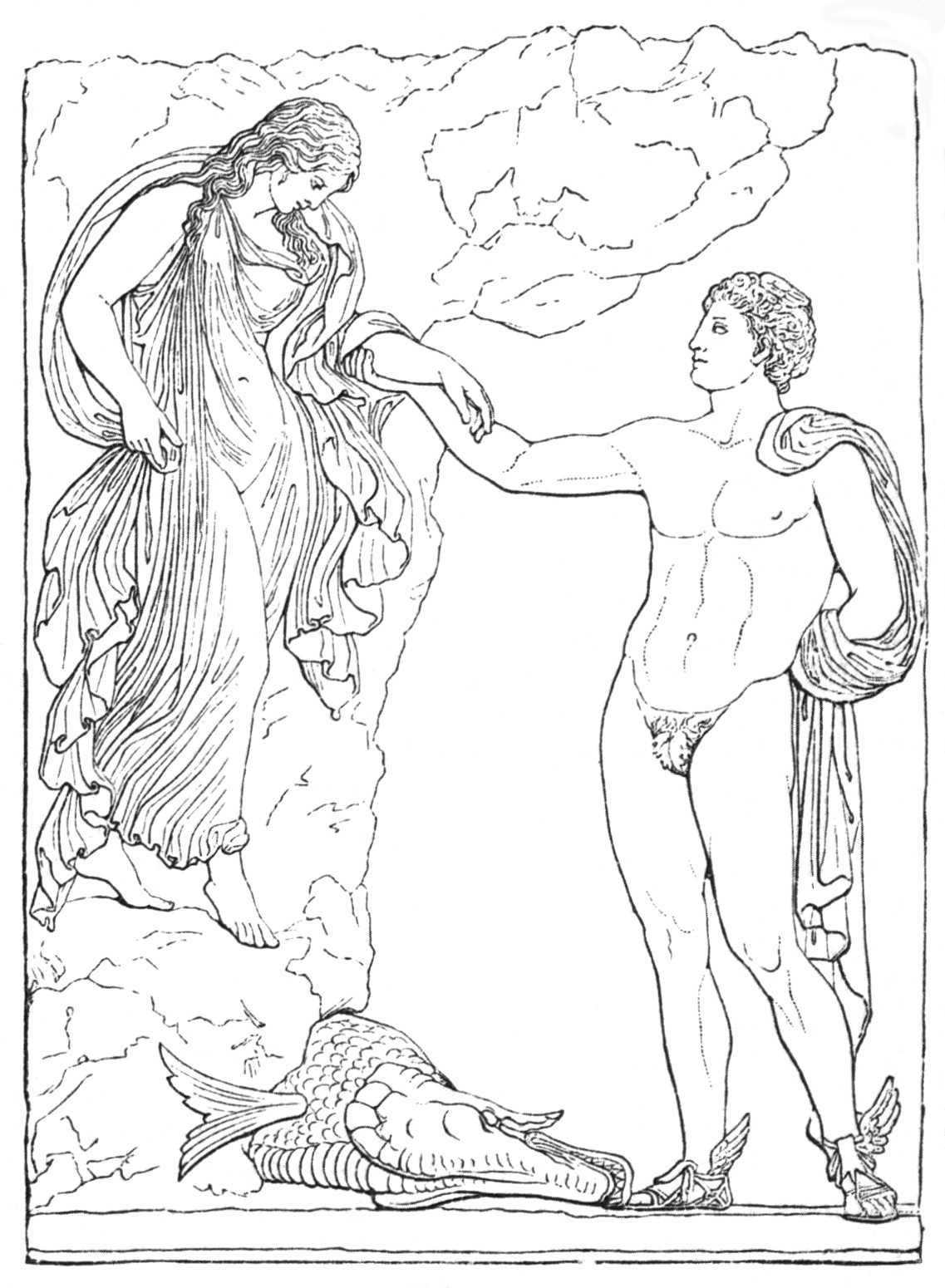
Perseus and Andromeda, fig leaf copy of original relief work

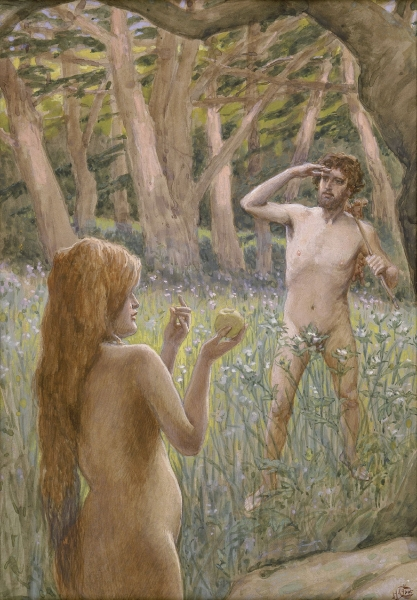
Adam is Tempted by Eve by James Tissot

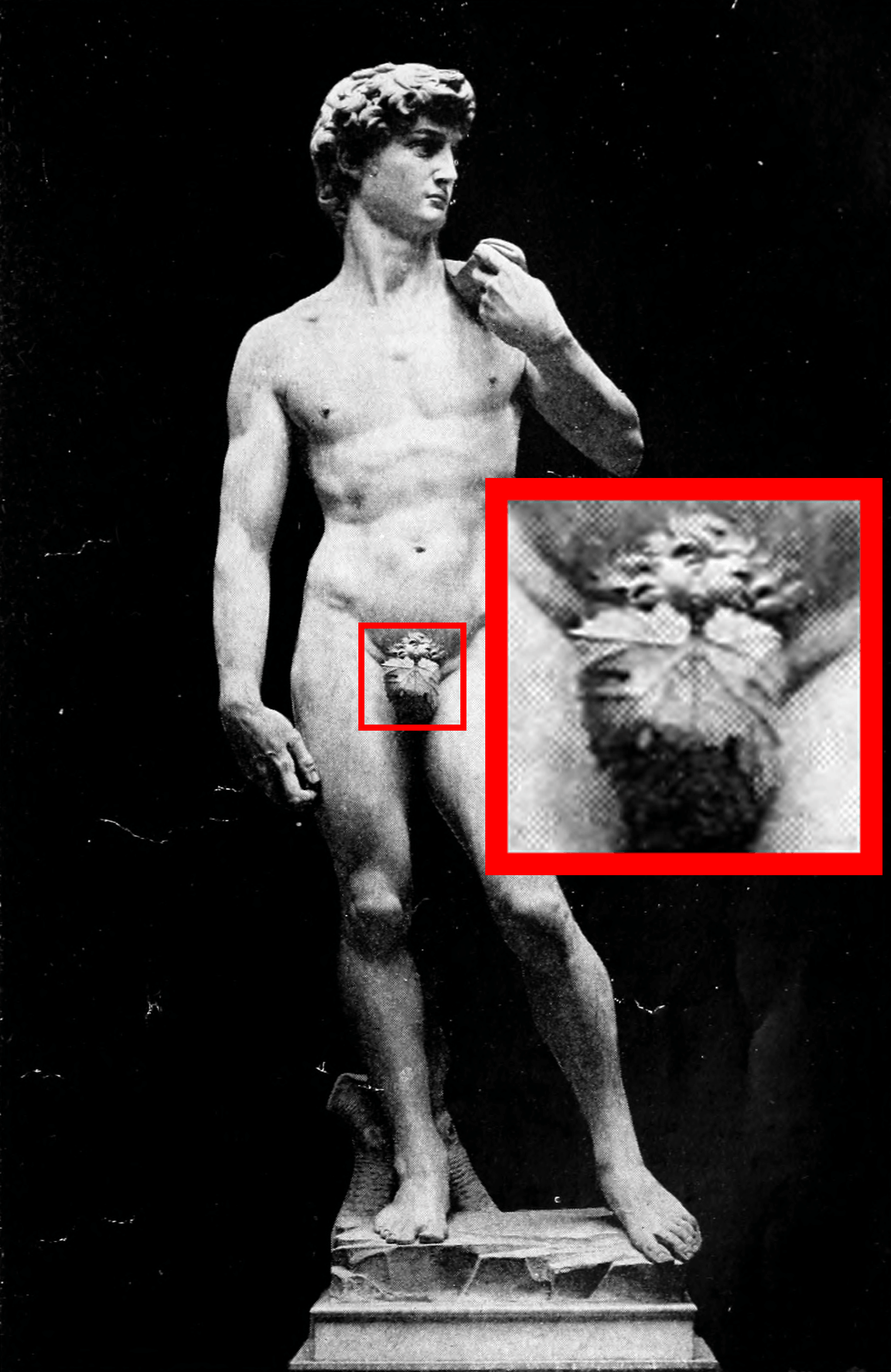
Plaster cast of Michelangelo's David in the Victoria and Albert Museum, London

== See also ==
- Censorship
- Religion and sexuality
- Christian naturism
- Olive branch
- Rhetorical shields

== General bibliography ==
- Kuh, Richard H (1967). Foolish Figleaves?: Pornography in and Out of Court (2nd ed.). Macmillan.
