= I'm not racist, but... =

Phrase

I'm not racist, but... is a phrase that may precede a racist argument and provides a "veneer of political correctness".

== Interpretations ==
The phrase has been described as "hypocritical" and "apologetic". Eduardo Bonilla-Silva and Tyrone Forman argued that it is used by "the new racists, all the nice Whites". Alana Lentin, in an op-ed for ABC, cited the phrase as an example of "how denying racism reproduces its violence". Deutsche Welle's Torsten Landsberg and Rachel Stewart wrote that the refrain is "usually followed by an opinion that belies at best ignorance and at worst a deep-seated prejudice or even racially fueled hatred". Ibram X. Kendi felt that its usage is an ineffective means of combating racism.

== Frequency ==
"I oppose them, mainly because, I am not a racist but because I think you should have the best person for the job".

— Response in a survey of students' opinions on affirmative action.

Baugh (1991) found that when people were asked why the term African-American should or should not be used, many respondents prefaced their answers with "I'm not racist, but...". Brown (2006) found that the phrase was often used by Lancastrian interviewees who were concerned about the influx of racial minorities. Simon Goodman of Coventry University wrote that the phrase encapsulates "a major feature of talk about immigration is the repeated denial that opposition to it is racist".

Edwy Plenel ascribed the saying to the "average Frenchman". Mahfoud Bennoune expressed a similar opinion, writing in 1975 that "The typical French racist attitude is expressed in this manner, 'I'm not racist, but I find that the Algerians are the rabble that must be expelled; the syphilis that arises like arrows'". Interviewed in 2018, American former white supremacist Adrianne Black said that her father had, when recruiting people into white nationalism, sought those who would "start a sentence by saying, 'I'm not racist, but.' And if they've said that, they're almost there".

The Irish Times' Donald Clarke wrote that Halle Bailey's casting in The Little Mermaid "reveal[ed] the usual unconvincing qualification". The Twitter account YesYoureRacist seeks to condemn "casual racism on Twitter" and "retweet[s] everyday users who say: 'I'm not racist but ...' followed by something, well, racist".

== See also ==
- Rhetorical shields
- Fig leaf
- I'm not racist, I have black friends
- I'm not an anti-vaxxer, but...
- I'm not a scientist
