= 1588 in art =

Events from the year 1588 in art.

== Events ==
- Opificio delle pietre dure established in Florence.
- Creation of the Dutch Republic leads to Dutch Golden Age painting.
- Cornelis van Haarlem starts working on The Fall of the Titans

== Paintings ==
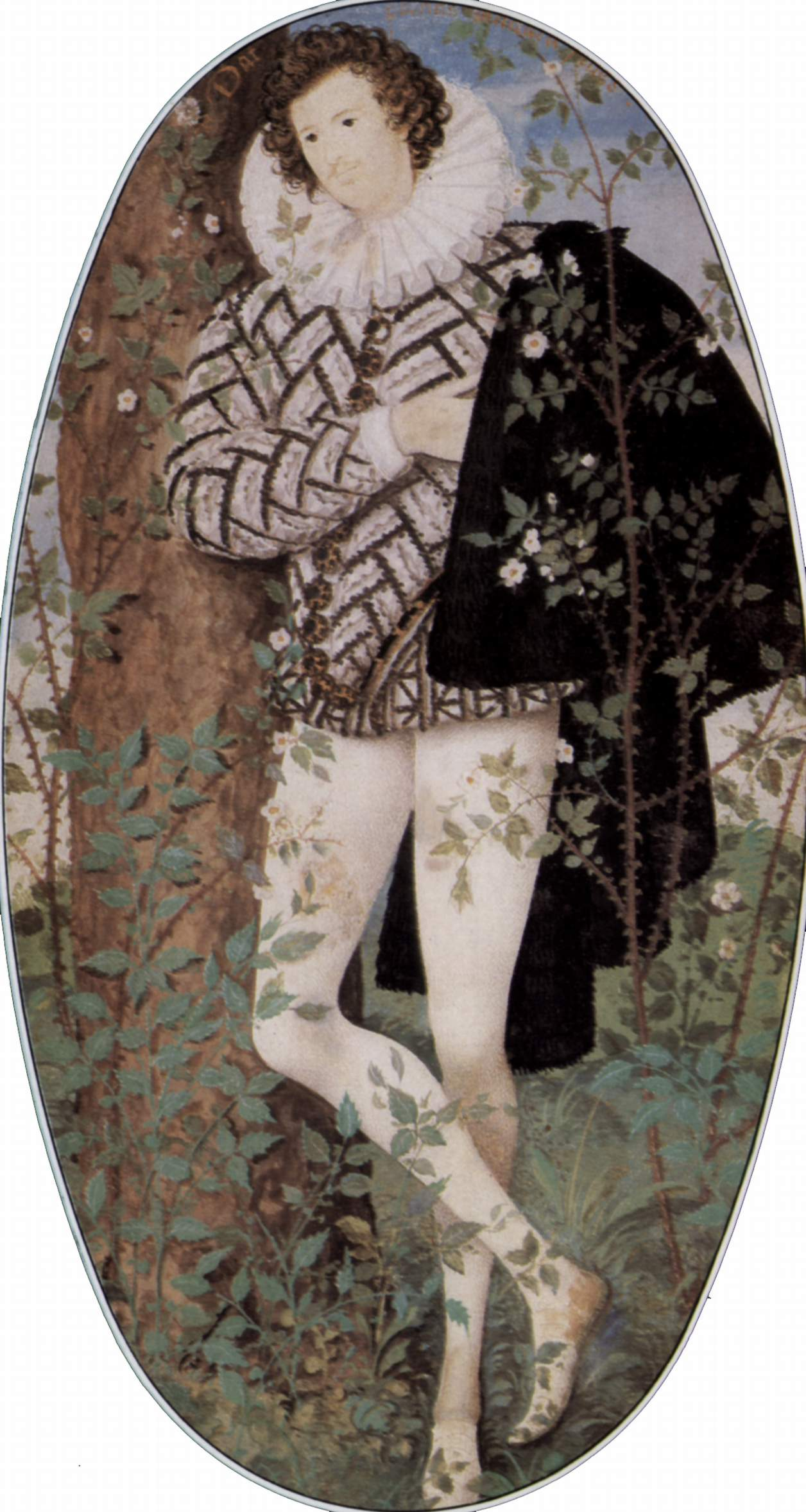
Hilliard – Young Man Among Roses

- Annibale Carracci – approximate date
  - Landscape with a Fishing Scene (Musée du Louvre)
  - Venus with a Satyr and Cupids (Uffizi)
- Hendrik Goltzius – The Four Disgracers (engravings)
- George Gower – Armada Portrait of Elizabeth I of England
- Cornelis van Haarlem - Baptism of Christ
- Nicholas Hilliard – Young Man Among Roses
- Kaspar Memberger the Elder – Building of the Ark
- Hans von Aachen – The Judgement of Paris (approximate date)

== Births ==
- January 10 – Nicolaes Eliaszoon Pickenoy, Dutch painter of Flemish origin (died 1653/1656)
- January 20 – Francesco Gessi, Italian painter of frescoes (died 1649)
- September 10 (bapt.) – Nicholas Lanier, English composer, singer, lutenist, painter and art collector (died 1666)
- date unknown
  - Claude Deruet, French Baroque painter (died 1660)
  - Giuseppe Badaracco, Italian painter of the Baroque period (died 1657)
  - Marco Antonio Bassetti, Italian painter (died 1630)
  - Ilario Casolano, Italian painter of the Baroque period (died 1661)
  - Hendrick ter Brugghen, Dutch painter, and a leading member of the Dutch followers of Caravaggio (died 1629)
  - Jan Sadeler II, Flemish engraver of the Sadeler family (died 1665)
  - Cristóbal Vela, Spanish Baroque painter and gilder (died 1654)

== Deaths ==
- March 9 – Pomponio Amalteo, Italian painter of the Venetian school (born 1505)
- April 19 – Paolo Veronese, Italian painter of the Renaissance in Venice (born 1528)
- August 8 – Alonso Sánchez Coello, portrait painter of the Spanish Renaissance (born 1531/1532)
- date unknown
  - Marco Marchetti, Italian painter (born 1528)
  - Jacques le Moyne de Morgues, French artist and member of Jean Ribault's expedition to the New World (born 1533)
  - Plautilla Nelli, Florentine religious painter and nun (born 1524)
  - Jacopo Strada, Italian painter, architect, goldsmith, inventor of machines, numismatist, linguist, collector and merchant of works of art (born 1507)
