= Baptism of Christ (Van Haarlem) =

Painting by Cornelis van Haarlem

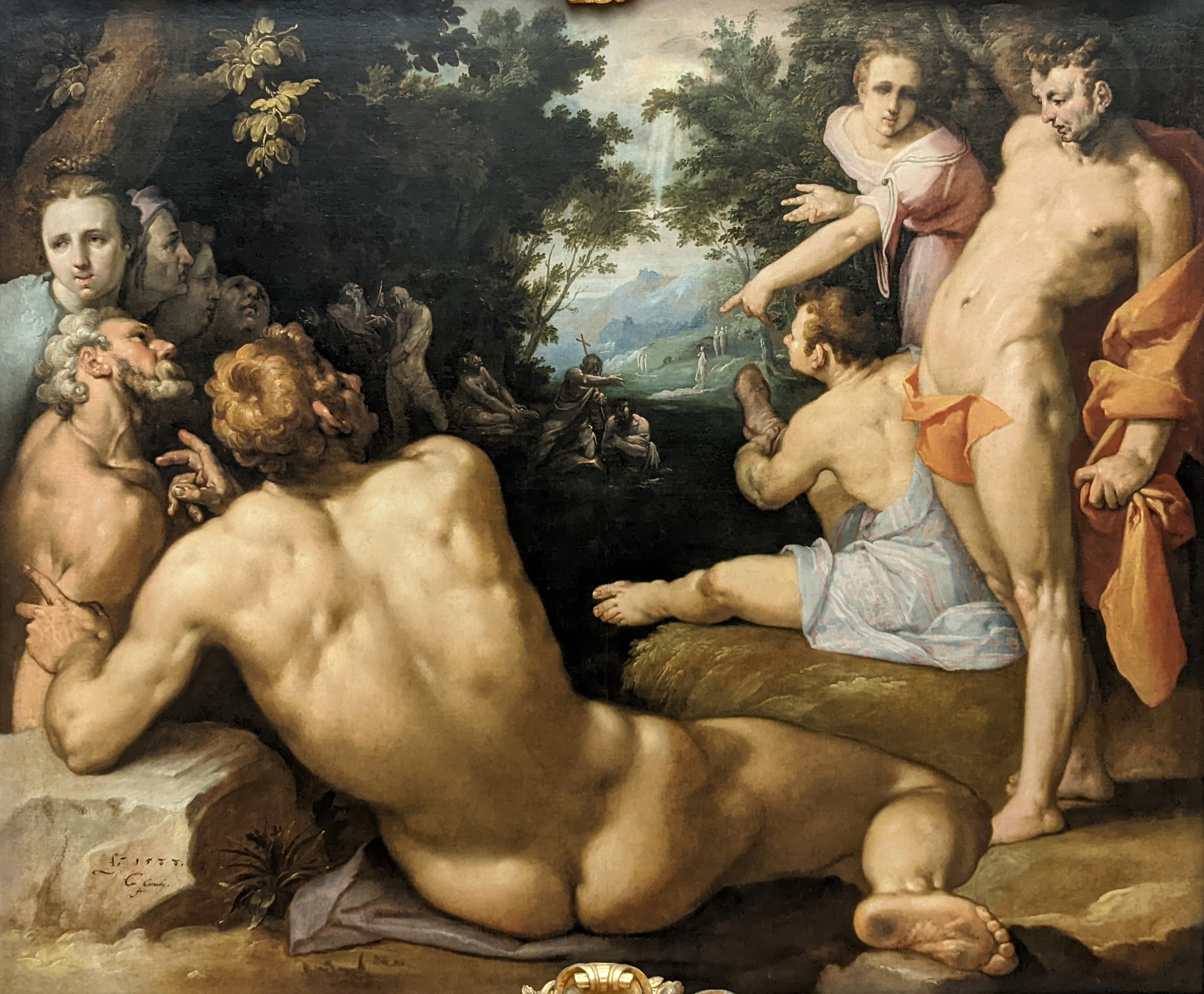
Baptism of Christ (1588) by Cornelis Cornelisz van Haarlem

Baptism of Christ is a 1588 oil on canvas painting by Cornelis Cornelisz van Haarlem, now in the Musée du Louvre, in Paris, which acquired it in 1983 (RF 1983-25).

== Description ==
The painting depicts the Baptism of Christ. Jesus is pictured in the center of the painting, being baptised by John the Baptist. Numerous figures surround them, creating a border.
