= I'm not racist, I have black friends =

Informal fallacy

"I'm not racist; I have black friends" (variant: "Some of my best friends are black") is a saying, most commonly used by white people, to claim that they are not racist towards black people or people of color. The phrase, which gained popularity in the mid-2010s, has since sparked many internet memes and debates over racial attitudes. Its use in a discussion related to the election of Donald Trump as U.S. president in 2016, on the American television show Black-ish, led to widespread discussion in the media of the "old trope".

A 2004 study in Basic and Applied Social Psychology listed the phrase as a "common [claim of] innocence by association". A 2011 study published in the Journal of Black Studies suggested that African Americans were rarely impressed by whites claiming to have "black friends", and that the claim was more likely to make African Americans think that the person making it was in fact more, not less, prejudiced. The phrase is cited as an instance of "resistance to antiracist thinking", and some suggestions for dismantling the logic of the phrase include "it is like saying there is no such thing as sexism because we all have a close friend or family member who is a woman".

== See also ==
- I'm not racist, but...
- I'm not a scientist
- Rhetorical shields
- Tokenism
