= Allegory of Vanity and Repentance =

Painting by Cornelis van Haarlem

- Human Love and Divine Love, Pagan Life and Christian Life
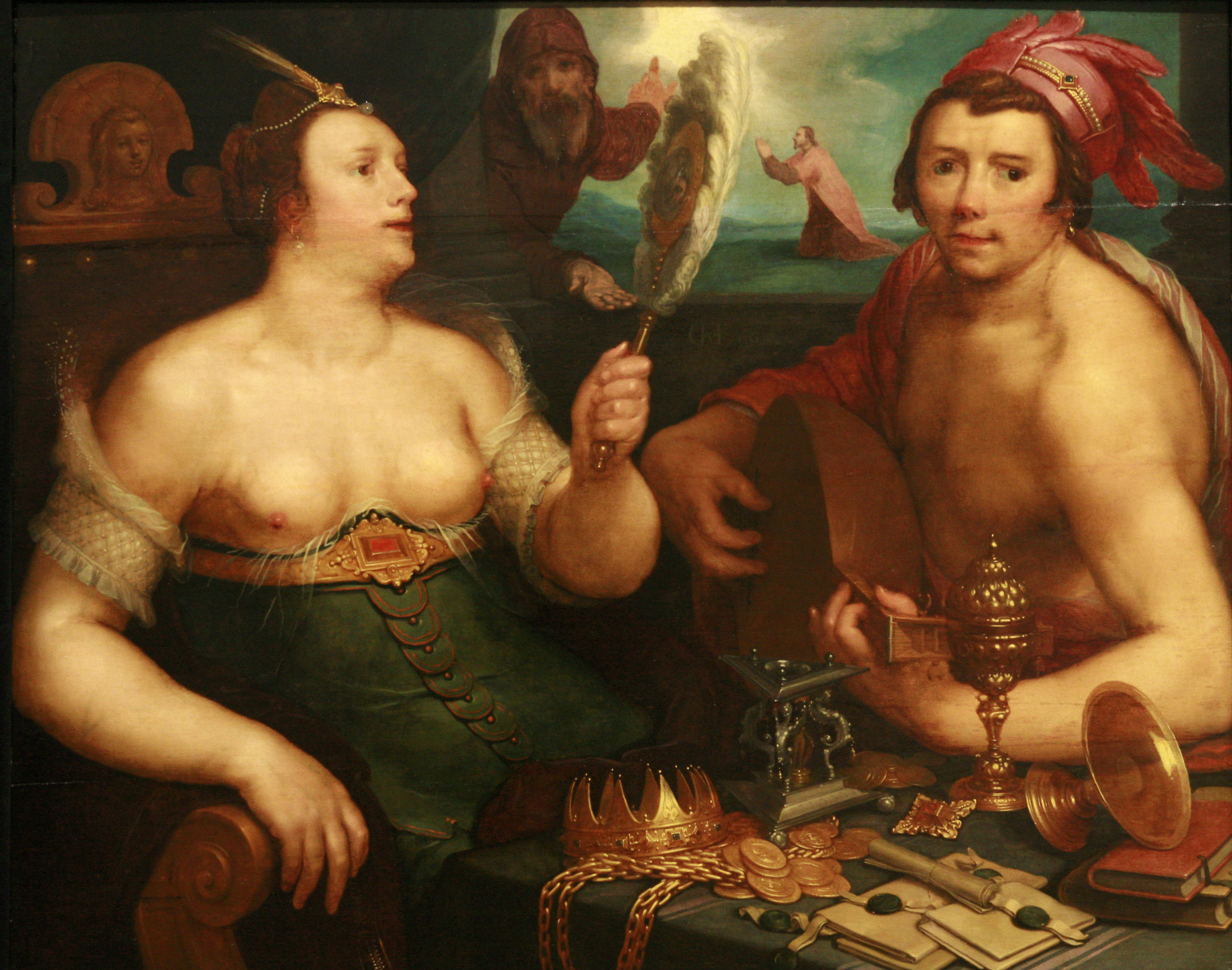
- Artist: Cornelis van Haarlem
- Year: 1616
- Medium: oil painting on panel
- Movement: Northern Mannerism; Dutch Golden Age painting Catholic art
- Subject: Allegory of Vanitas
- Dimensions: 100 cm × 125 cm (39 in × 49 in)
- Location: Musée des Beaux-Arts; Strasbourg
- Accession: 1942

Allegory of Vanity and Repentance is a 1616 oil painting by the Dutch artist Cornelis van Haarlem. It is now housed in the Musée des Beaux-Arts of Strasbourg, France, with the inventory number 1969. The painting is also known by its lesser-used titles Human Love and Divine Love, and was previously referred to as Pagan Life and Christian Life. Although the Dutch Republic was predominantly Protestant in 1616, van Haarlem created this painting for a Catholic patron.

In the foreground of the painting, a couple is depicted: a woman with a mirror and bare breasts, personifying Vanitas and a musician gazing at the viewer, personifying fleeting pleasure, as embodied by the sounds of his instrument. On a table before them lie a crown, golden coins, and other precious wordly objects, such as a hanap. A bearded monk, visible through the window, captures the viewer's attention by pointing towards Jesus praying in the Garden; his outstretched right hand towards the couple signifies that they may join him through repentance and be saved.
