= Rhetorical shield =

Discursive buffers

In the context of race, rhetorical shields are semantic moves or strategically managed propositions to safely state certain views. They commonly appear as nonracial utterances between racial statements.

== Examples ==
"Rhetorical shields are just that: shields, pieces of armor to protect us when we want to avoid making mistakes when talking about race. They are face-saving techniques used when pushed on a slight undertone of racism to quickly move back to a position of neutrality."

― My Racial Journey, University of Pittsburgh Office of Child Development.

=== Disclaimers ===
Disclaimers serve as a strategy to dismiss the racial nature of a story. They are used to save face, as they allow a return to safety in situations. Examples of such utterances are "I am not a racist, but..." and "Some of my best friends are black". The phrase "yes and no" as a response to a question about an issue could also be used in such a manner, as it is a way to portray ambivalence on a controversial issue, apparently taking or examining all sides, even though it may conclude with strong support for one side of the issue.

Another way to achieve this is through credentialing, which entails a discursive practice of listing characteristics that make one not a racist.

=== Projection ===
Projection may serve as a strategy to escape from guilt or responsibility and affix blame elsewhere. For example, people may blame other groups for segregating themselves to explain their lack of friends within that group. Another example is the expression of concern for how other people would feel. This is sometimes seen in the issue of affirmative action, where opponents may argue that minorities would feel bad and inferior due to preferential treatment, even though they themselves may be the recipients of preferential treatment.

=== Diminutives ===
Diminutives may be used as a strategy to lessen the impact of statements. This strategy could also be used to portray other people as too sensitive, as issues would be reduced to only a little thing. For example, people may say that they are "a little bit" against affirmative action, even though they strongly oppose it.

=== Indirectness ===
Indirectness is employed as a protective way to approach certain topics. For example, the question "Where are you from?" is often used as a substitute for "What is your race?" by people who are not comfortable asking the latter outright.
