= The Fall of the Titans =

Painting by Cornelis van Haarlem

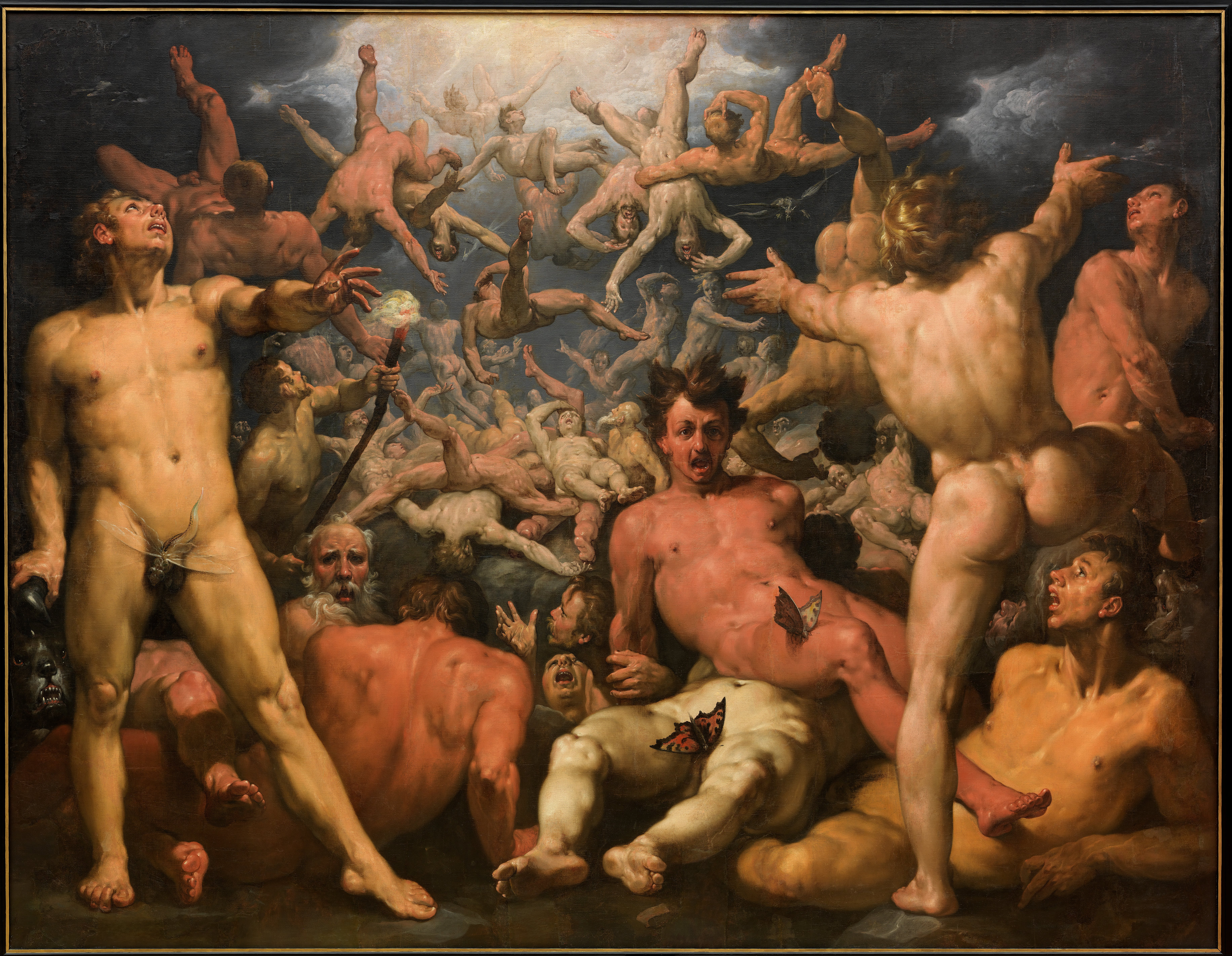
- Artist: Cornelis van Haarlem
- Year: 1588–1590
- Medium: Oil on canvas
- Subject: Titanomachy
- Dimensions: 239 cm × 307 cm (94 in × 121 in)
- Location: Statens Museum; Copenhagen, Denmark

The Fall of the Titans is an oil painting of the Titanomachy by the Dutch painter Cornelis van Haarlem in 1588–1590. It measures 239 × 307 cm (94 × 121 in). The work is in the collection of the Statens Museum (the national art gallery) in Copenhagen, Denmark. It is an ambitious work of the Haarlem Mannerists, and a display of the artist's ability to devise and depict a large number of varied poses for the male nudes.

In Greek mythology, the Titans were members of the second generation of divine beings, descending from the primordial deities and preceding the Olympians. Based on Mount Othrys, the Titans most famously included the first twelve children of Gaia (Mother Earth) and Uranus (Father Sky). They ruled during the legendary Golden Age, and also comprised the first pantheon of Greek deities.

Just as the Titan Cronus overthrew his father Uranus, the Titans were overthrown by Cronus's children (Zeus, Hades, Poseidon, Hestia, Hera and Demeter), the core Olympian deities, in the Titanomachy (or "War of the Titans"), at the end of which they were imprisoned in Tartarus, a Greek version of Hell. Their arrival there is depicted in the painting.

The painting was bought by King Christian IV of Denmark in 1621, and followed with most of the royal collection into public ownership in the Statens Museum in the 19th century.
