= I'm not a scientist =

Political phrase

"I'm not a scientist" is a phrase that has been used by some American politicians, primarily those of the Republican Party and Libertarian Party, when asked about a scientific subject, such as global warming, or the age of the Earth. This phrase's use goes back at least to Ronald Reagan, during his presidential term in 1980. Other politicians who have used the phrase include: John Boehner, Rick Scott, Marco Rubio, Bobby Jindal, and Mitch McConnell. It has been criticized by Coral Davenport's writing for The New York Times, and by Steven Benen of the Rachel Maddow Show. It has also been satirized by Stephen Colbert of The Colbert Report.

President Barack Obama singled the phrase out in his 2015 State of the Union Address, saying:

I’ve heard some folks try to dodge the evidence [of global climate change] by saying they’re not scientists; that we don’t have enough information to act. Well, I’m not a scientist, either. But you know what, I know a lot of really good scientists at NASA, and at NOAA, and at our major universities. And the best scientists in the world are all telling us that our activities are changing the climate, and if we don’t act forcefully, we’ll continue to see rising oceans, longer, hotter heat waves, dangerous droughts and floods, and massive disruptions that can trigger greater migration and conflict and hunger around the globe.

== Association with poor results for Republican candidates ==
Ford O'Connell, a Republican strategist and conservative activist, has argued that the phrase "won't be a winner in the presidential field" for Republican candidates.

== Association with poor coverage of science by the American media ==
Commenting on the phenomenon, journalist Dan Rather deplored the antiscience attitude it evinces, but stated that the antiscience attitude was evident not just among Republicans, but throughout American society. He blamed the media for their poor coverage of science, and for presenting a false equivalency between scientific consensus and climate change denial.

== Denialism ==
According to Dave Levitan, science journalist and author of Not a Scientist, that line is just one of many rhetorical tactics used to undermine scientific findings that conflict with a political agenda. This phrase is a form of Science Denialism, such as oversimplification or cherry-picking data. By feigning a lack of expertise, politicians can sidestep accountability and avoid taking action on politically inconvenient truths.

== See also ==
- The Republican War on Science
