= Cornelis van Haarlem =

Dutch painter (1562–1638)

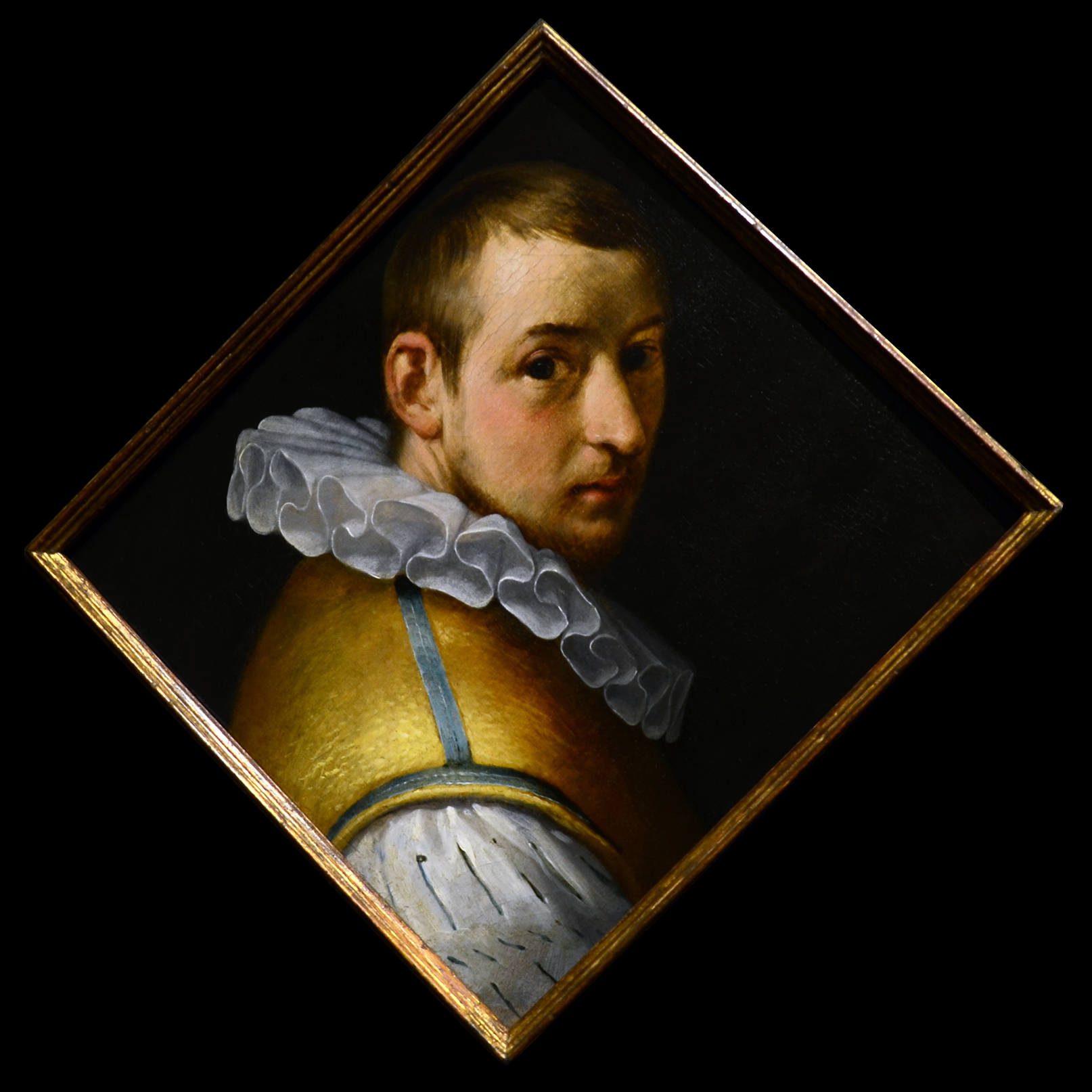
- Self-portrait (c. 1588–1590)
- Born: Cornelis Cornelisz. van Haarlem; 1562; Haarlem, Habsburg Netherlands
- Died: 11 November 1638 (aged 75–76); Haarlem, Dutch Republic
- Style: Northern Mannerism

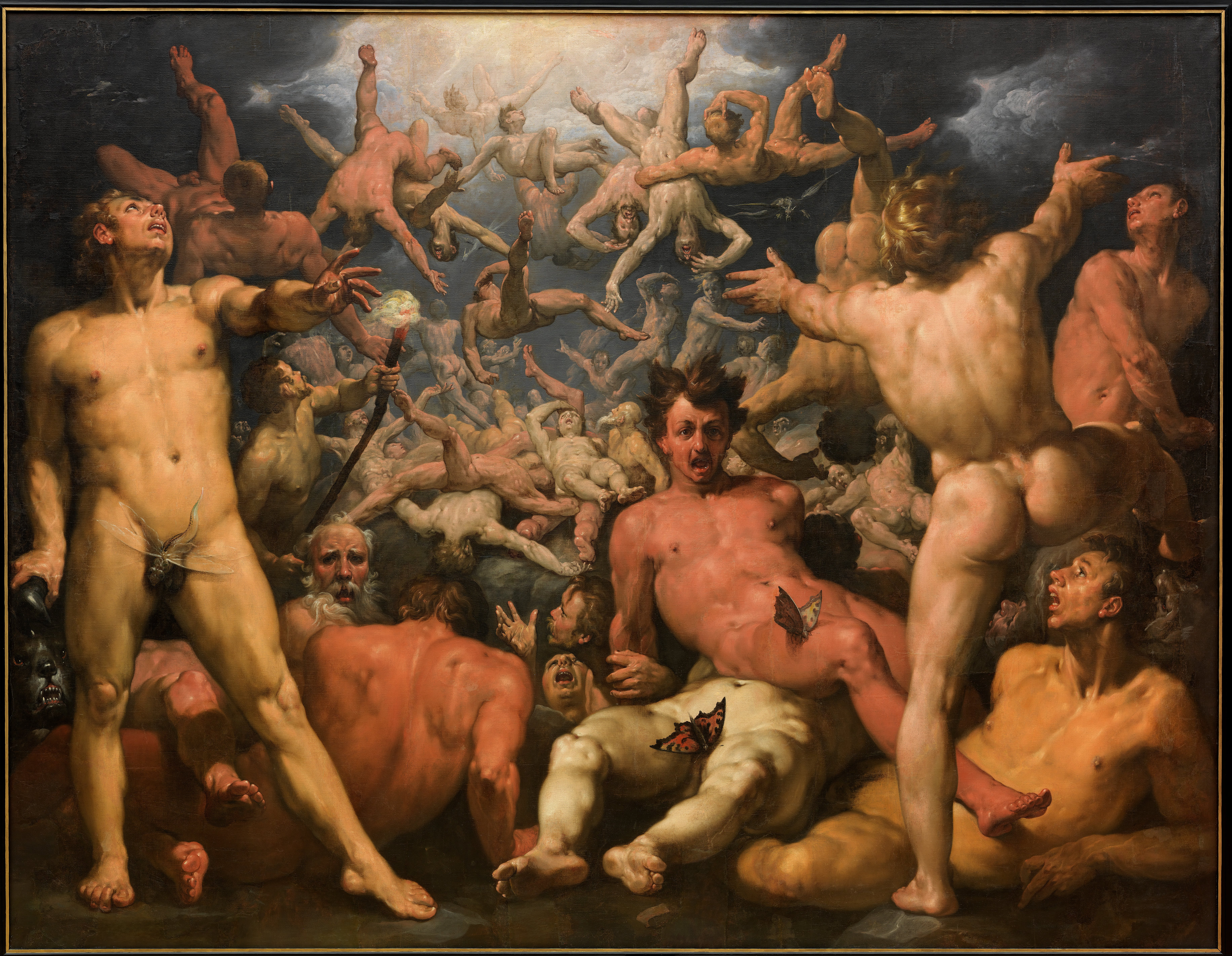
The Fall of the Titans (1588–1590)

Cornelis Corneliszoon van Haarlem (Note: Short version of the patronym Corneliszoon is Cornelisz.) (Dutch: [kɔrˈneːlɪs kɔrˈneːlɪsoːn vɑn ˈɦaːrlɛm]; 1562 – 11 November 1638) was a Dutch Golden Age painter and draughtsman, one of the leading Northern Mannerist artists in the Netherlands, and an important forerunner of Frans Hals as a portraitist.

== Biography ==
Born in Haarlem, Cornelis Corneliszoon van Haarlem was a pupil of Pieter Pietersz in Haarlem, and later Gillis Coignet in Antwerp. He is known among art historians as a member of the Haarlem Mannerists, who were highly influenced by the work of Bartholomeus Spranger, whose drawings were brought to Haarlem by Karel van Mander in 1585, and had a strong immediate effect. He painted mainly portraits as well as mythological and Biblical subjects. Initially Van Haarlem painted large-size, highly stylised works with Italianate nudes in twisted poses with a grotesque, unnatural anatomy. Later, his style changed to one based on the Netherlandish realist tradition.

When his parents fled Haarlem, as the Spanish army laid siege to the city in 1573 during the Eighty Years' War, Van Haarlem remained behind and was raised by the painter Pieter Pietersz the Elder, his first teacher. Later, in 1580–1581 Van Haarlem studied in Rouen, France, and Antwerp (with Coignet), before returning to Haarlem, where he stayed the rest of his life. He became a respected member of the community and in 1583 he received his first official commission from the city of Haarlem, a militia company portrait, the Banquet of the Haarlem Civic Guard. He later became city painter of Haarlem and received numerous official commissions. As a portrait painter, both of groups and individuals, he was an important influence on Frans Hals. He married Maritgen Arentsdr. Deyman, the daughter of a mayor of Haarlem, sometime before 1603. In 1605, he inherited a third of his wealthy father-in-law's estate.

== Works ==
Together with Karel van Mander, Hendrick Goltzius, and other artists, he started an informal drawing school that has become known in art history circles as the Haarlem Academy or "Haarlem Mannerists". Probably this was a very informal grouping, perhaps meeting to draw nude models, and certainly to exchange artistic views. Van Haarlem also played a role in the failed attempt to make a new charter for the Haarlem Guild of St. Luke in 1630, which tried to raise the status of the artists. His registered pupils were Salomon de Bray, Cornelis Jacobsz Delff, Cornelis Engelsz, and Gerrit Pietersz Sweelink. Among his students was Cornelis Claesz Heda (brother of Willem Claeszoon Heda), who seems to have exported Van Haarlem's particular brand of mannerism to India, where he was active at the court of the sultan of Bijapur.

Paintings by him are on display at the Frans Hals Museum in Haarlem, the Rijksmuseum in Amsterdam, the Louvre in Paris, the National Gallery in London, the Hermitage in Saint Petersburg, the Bass Museum in Miami Beach, and other museums.

== Gallery ==
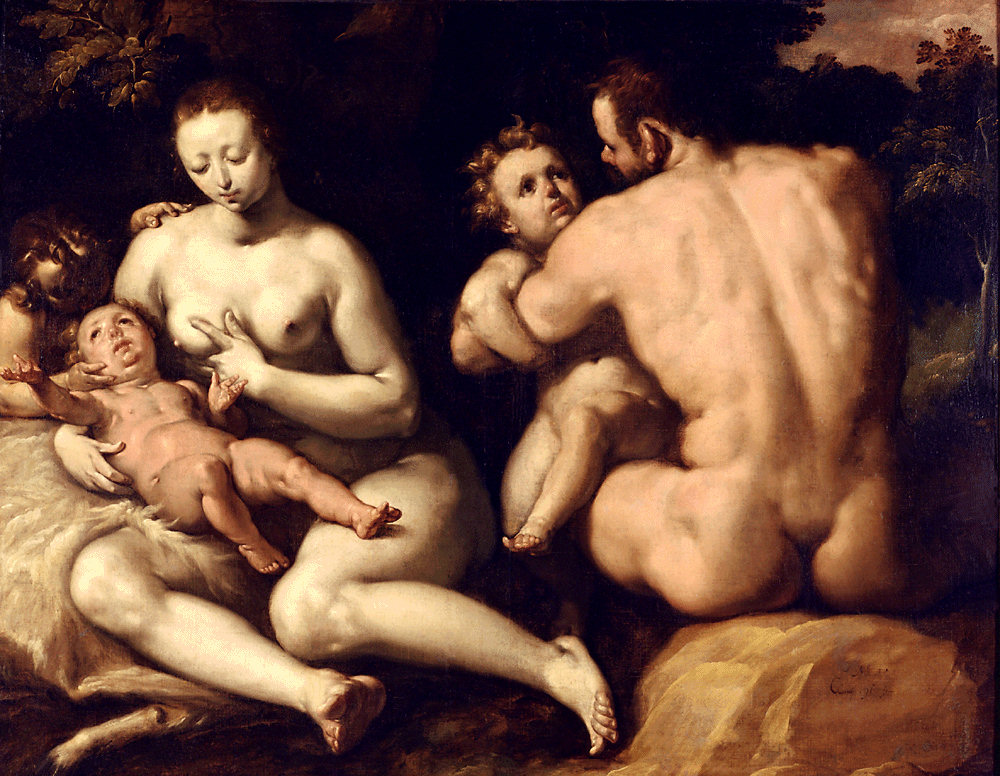
The first family (Noah and his family) (c.1582–1592)

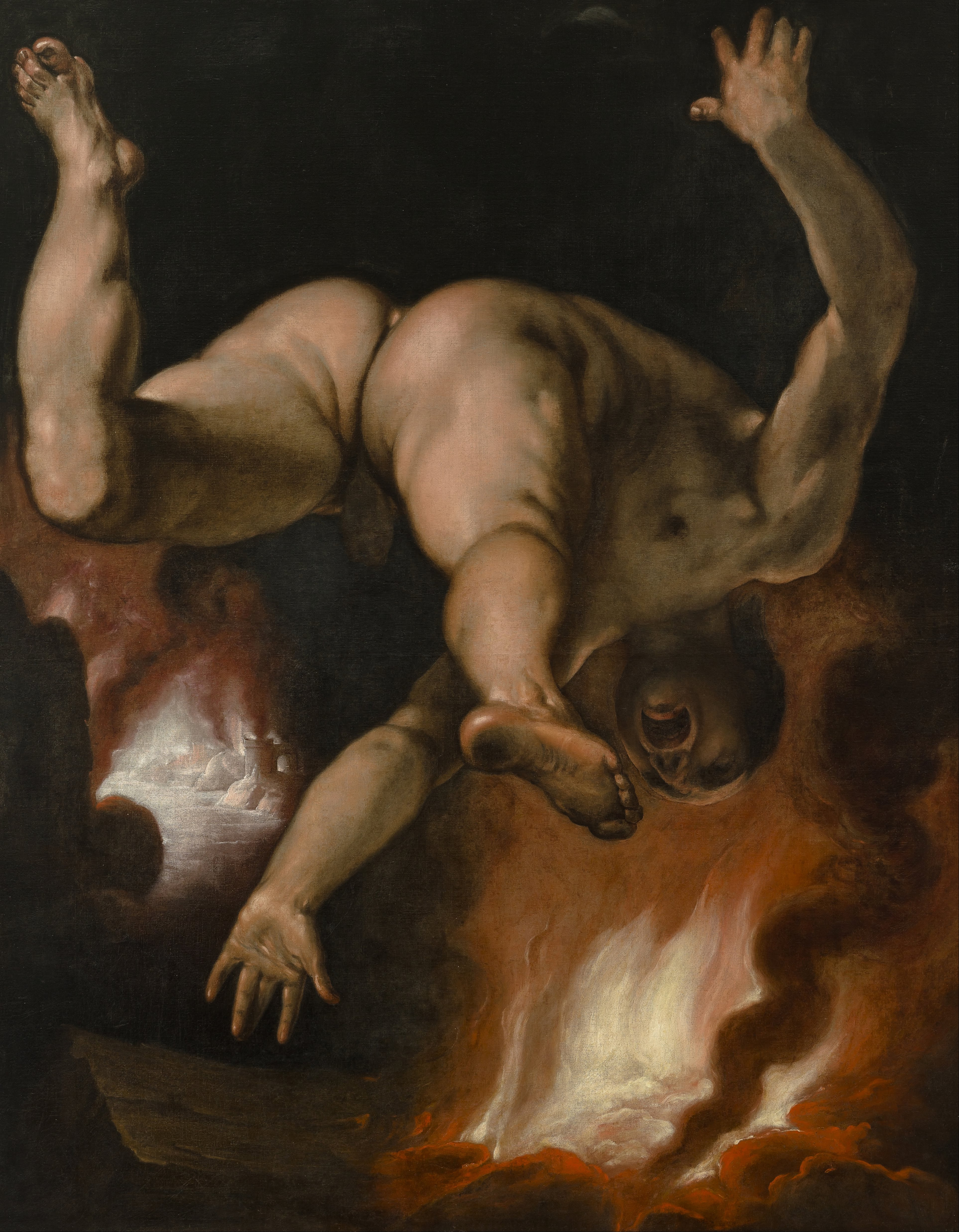
The Fall of Ixion, (1588)

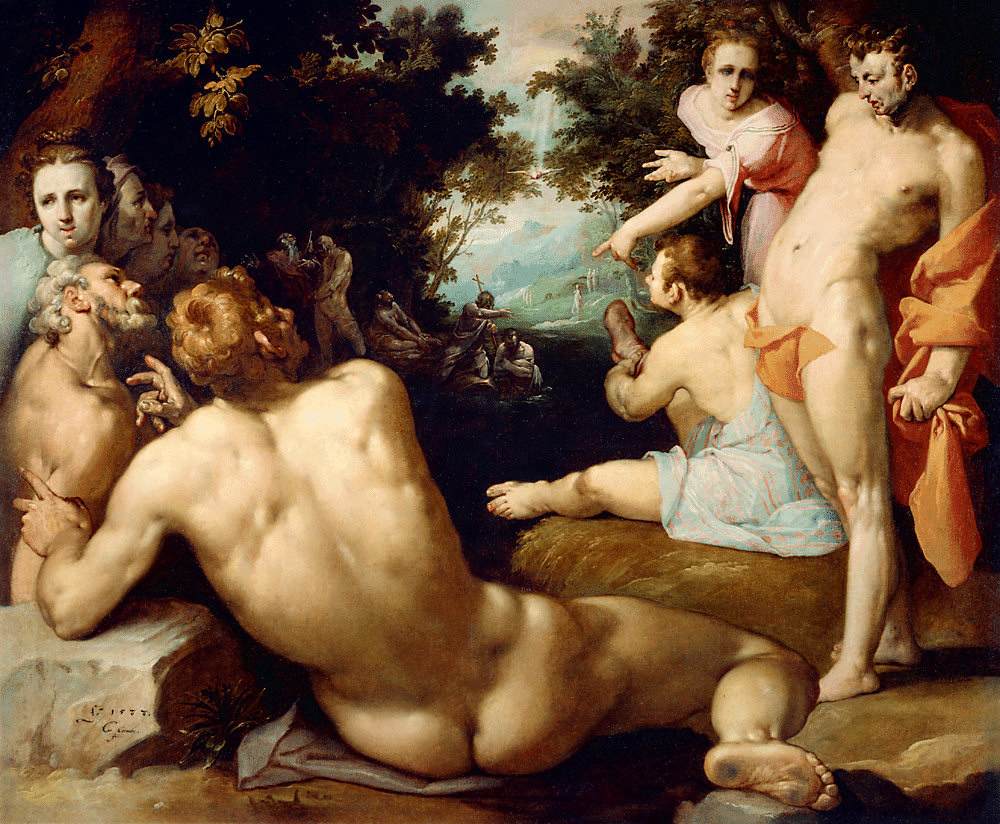
The Baptism of Christ (c.1588)

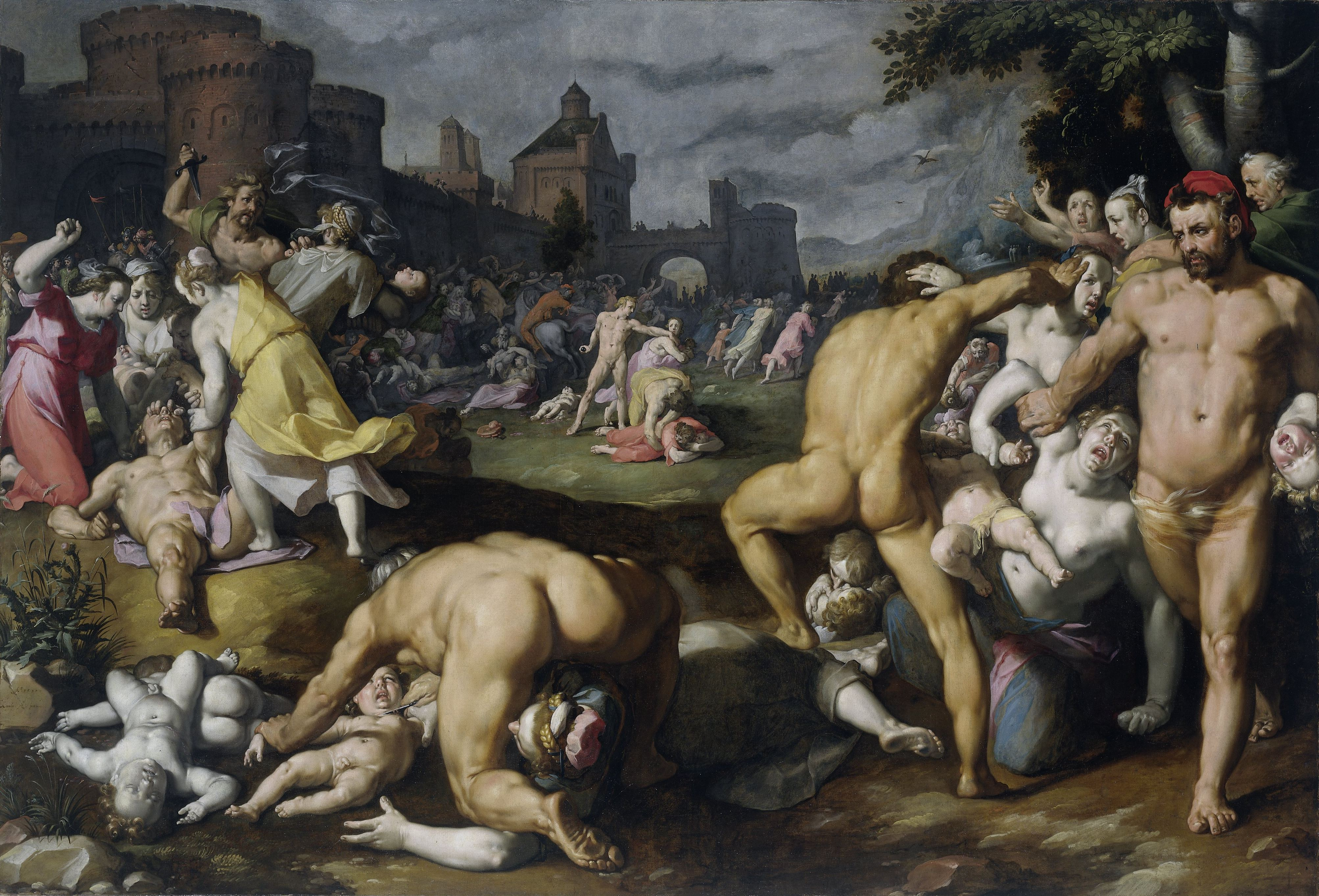
Massacre of the Innocents (1590)

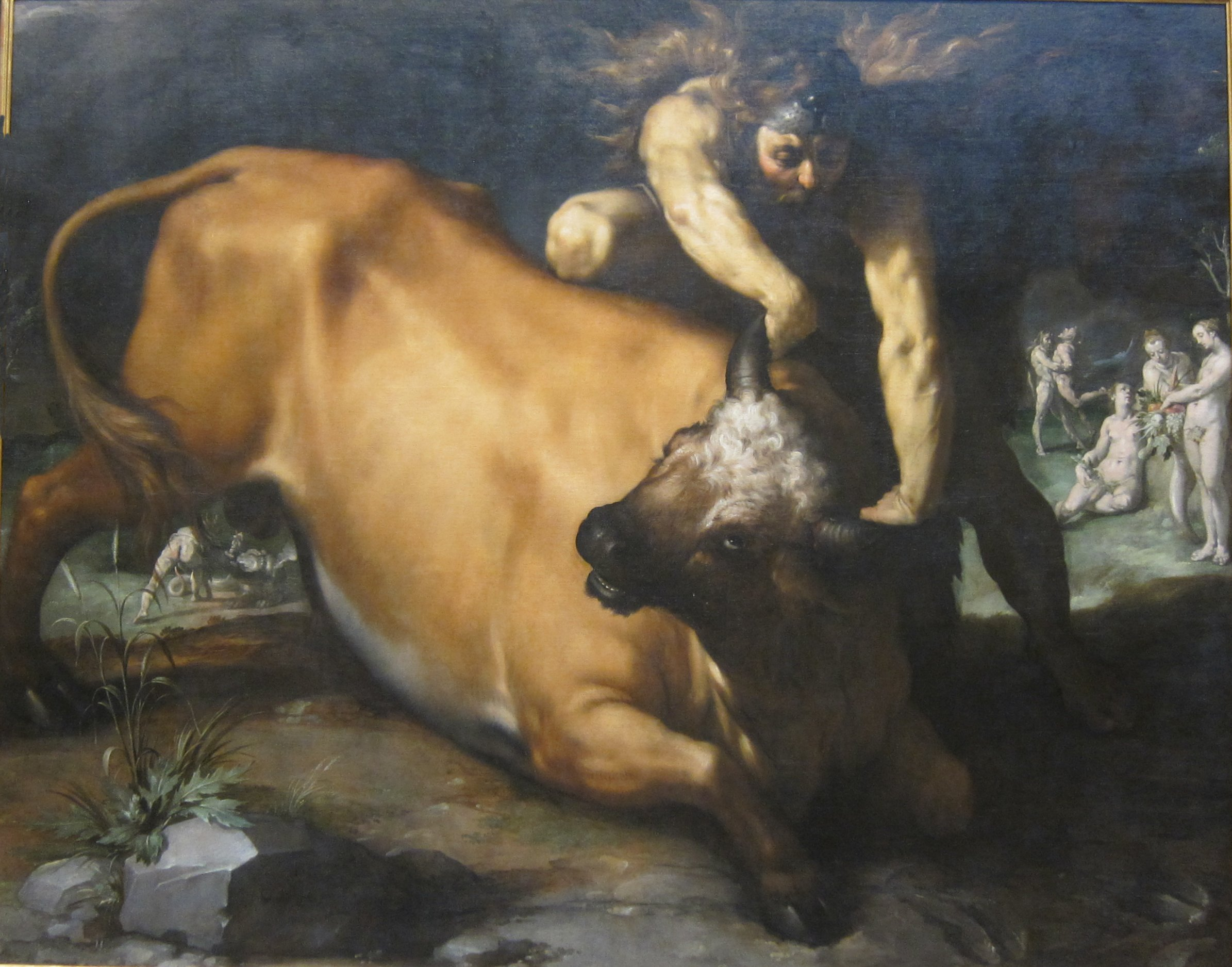
Hercules and Achelous (1590)

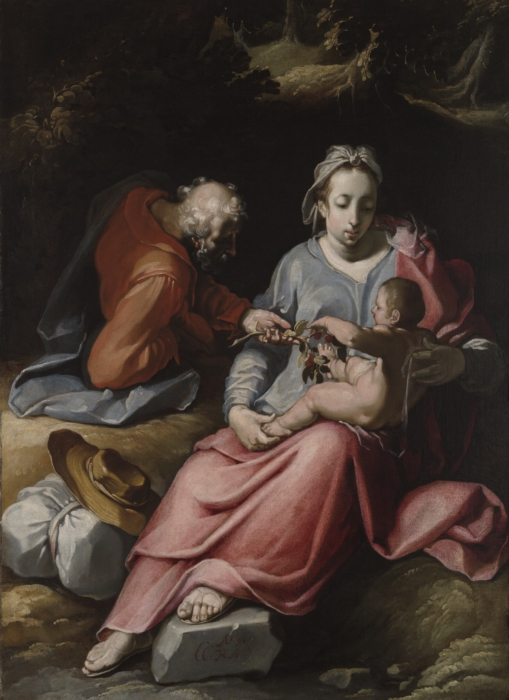
The Holy Family (1590)

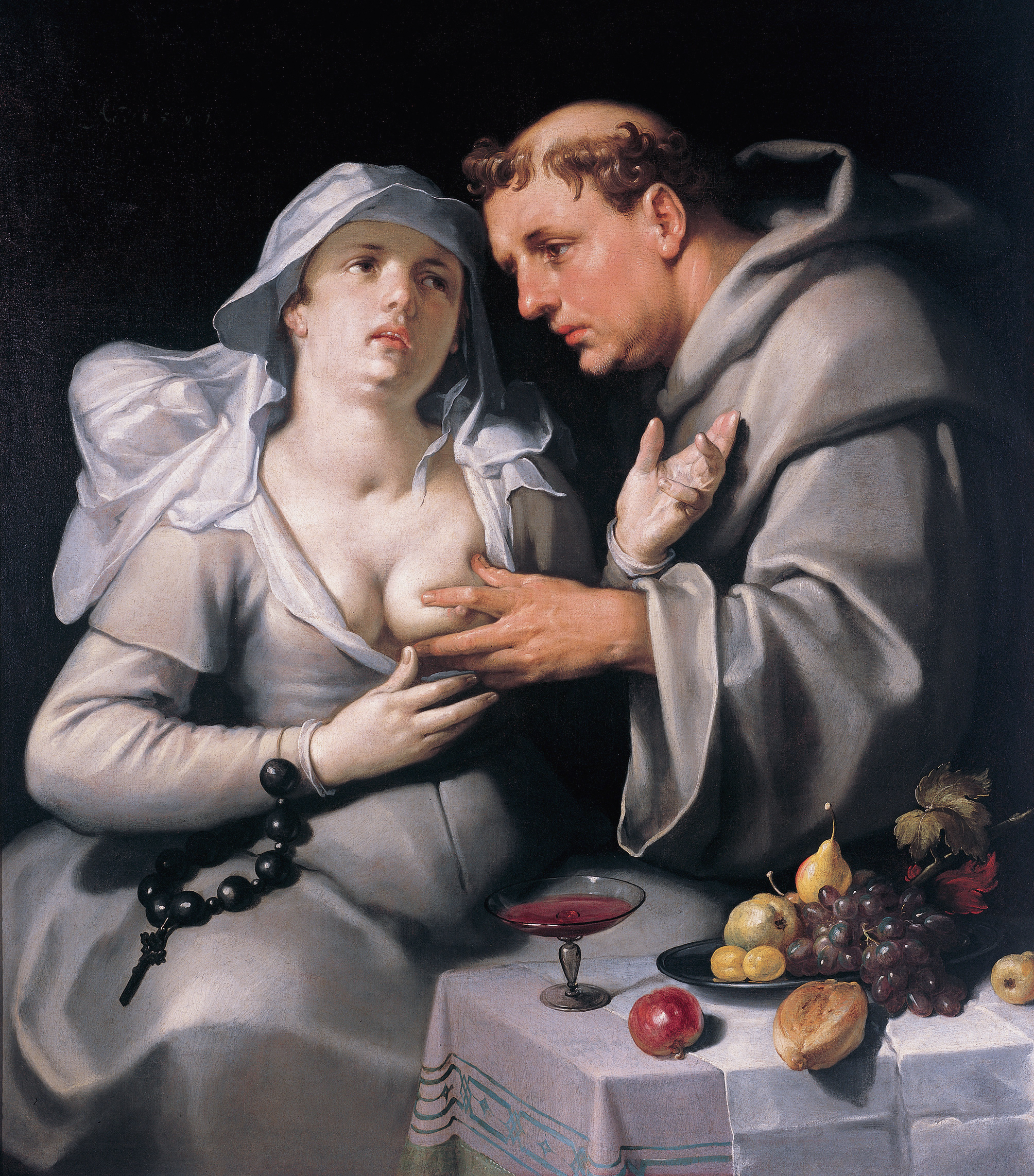
A Monk With a Beguine (1591)

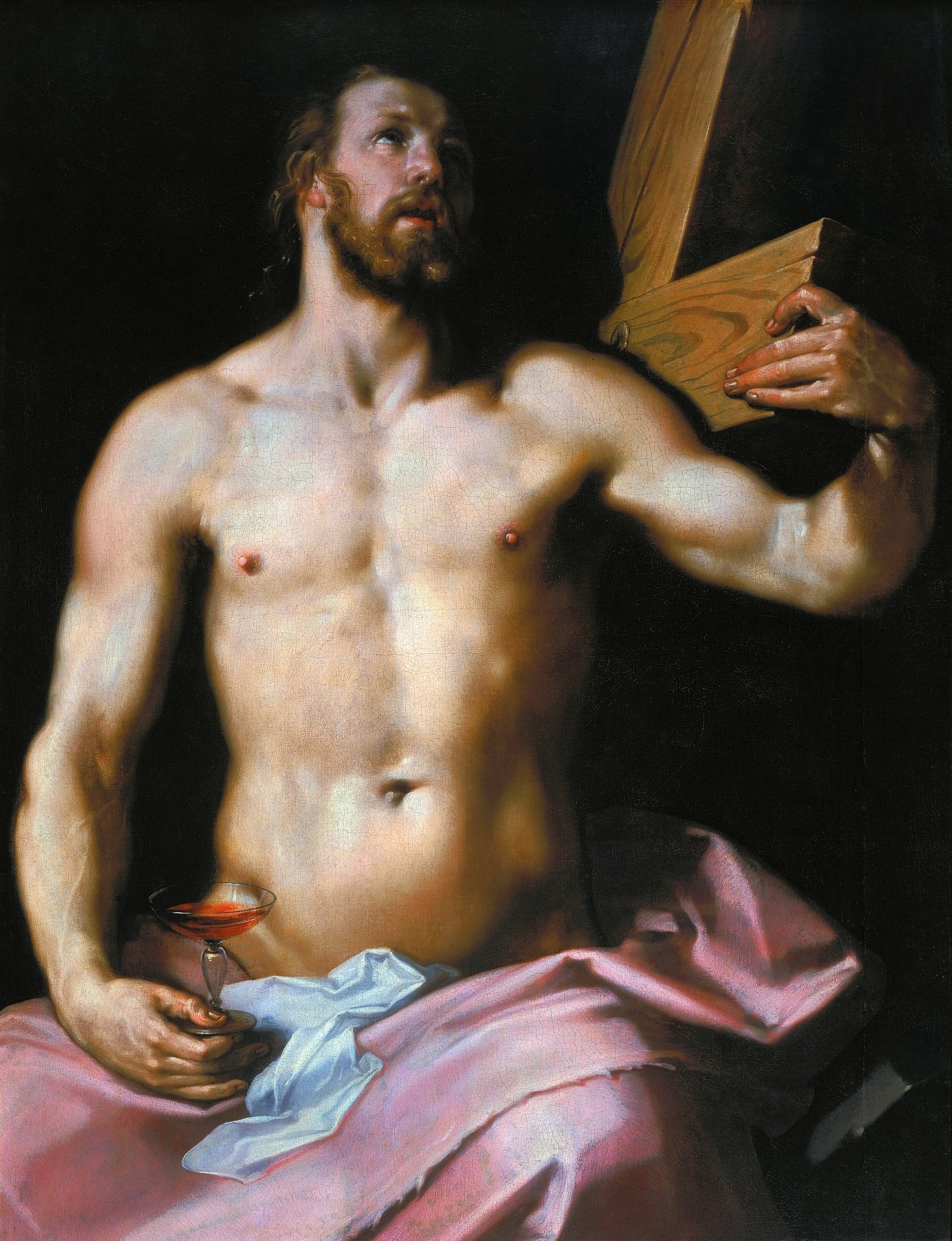
Christ the Redeemer, c. 1591.

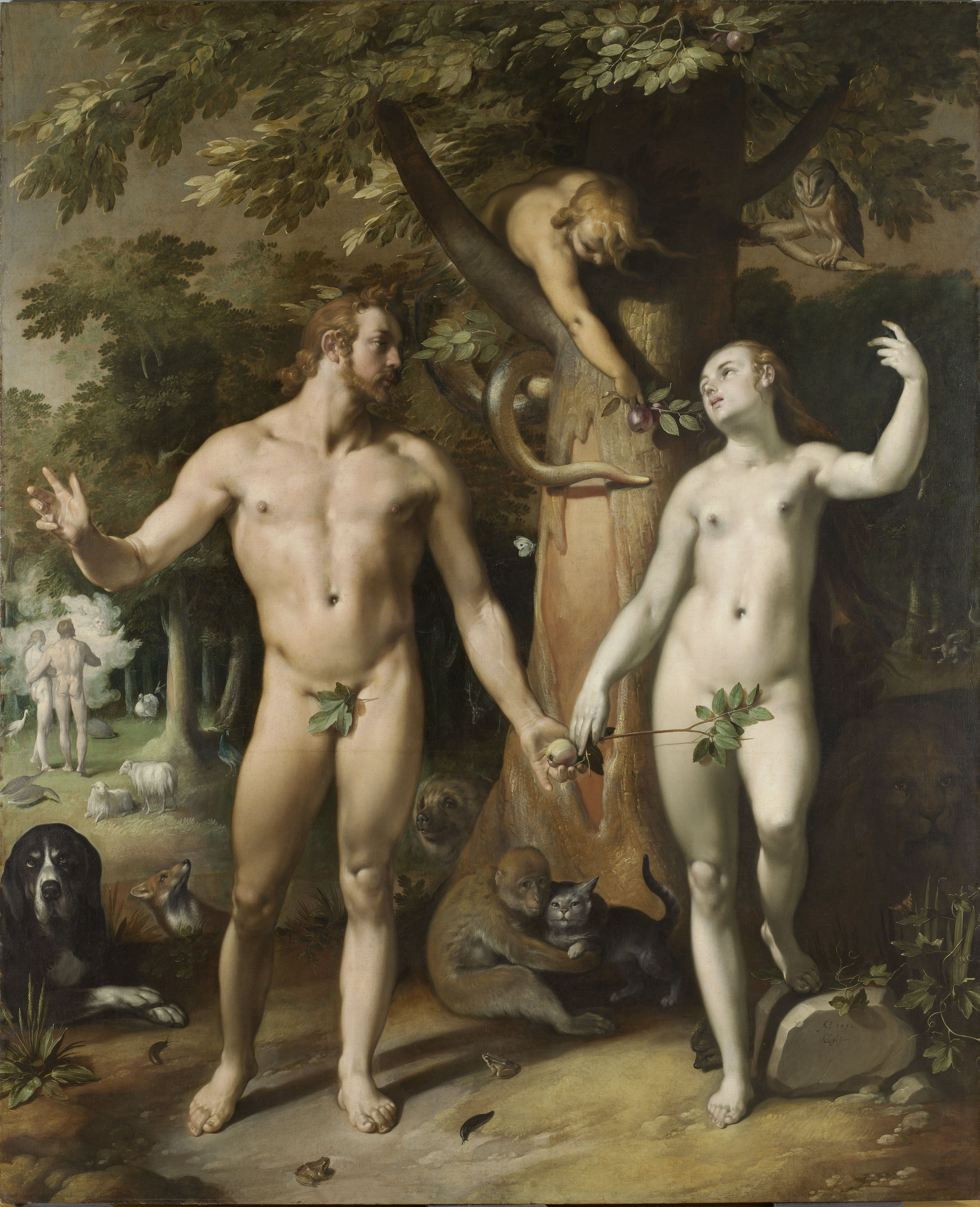
The Fall of Man (1592)

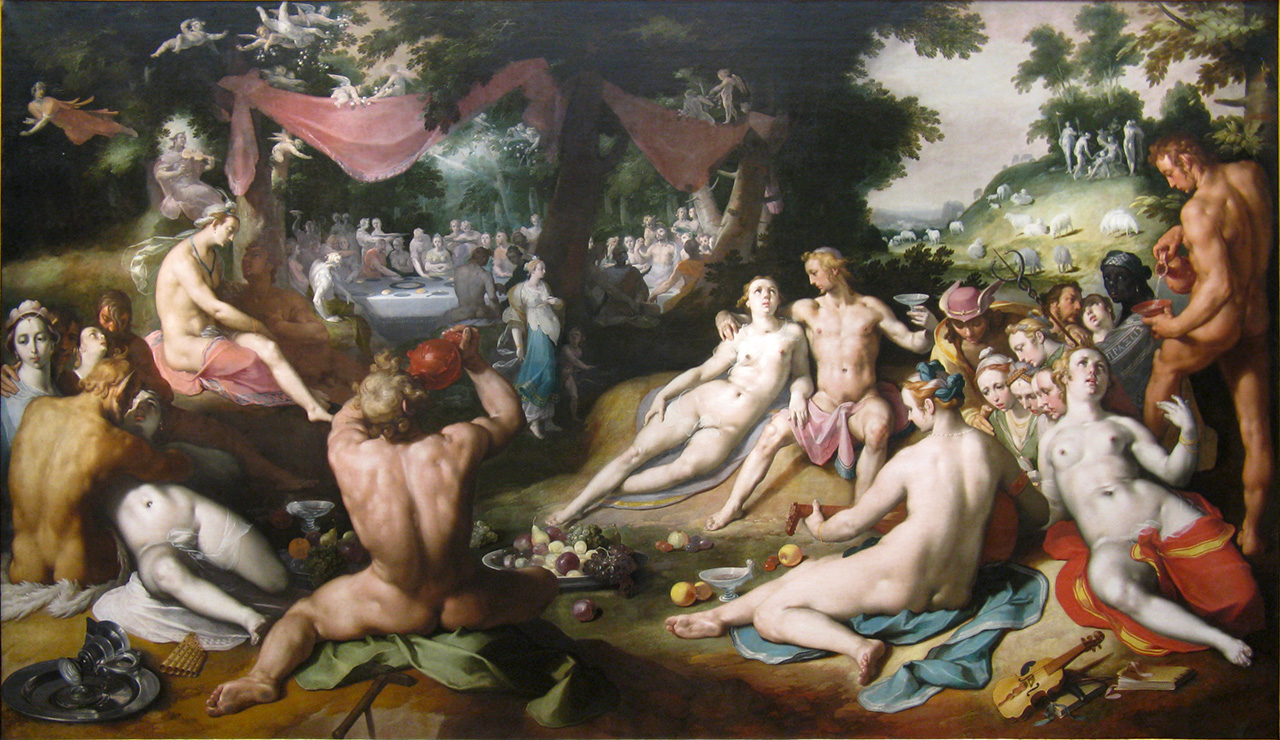
The Wedding of Peleus and Thetis, c. 1592–93

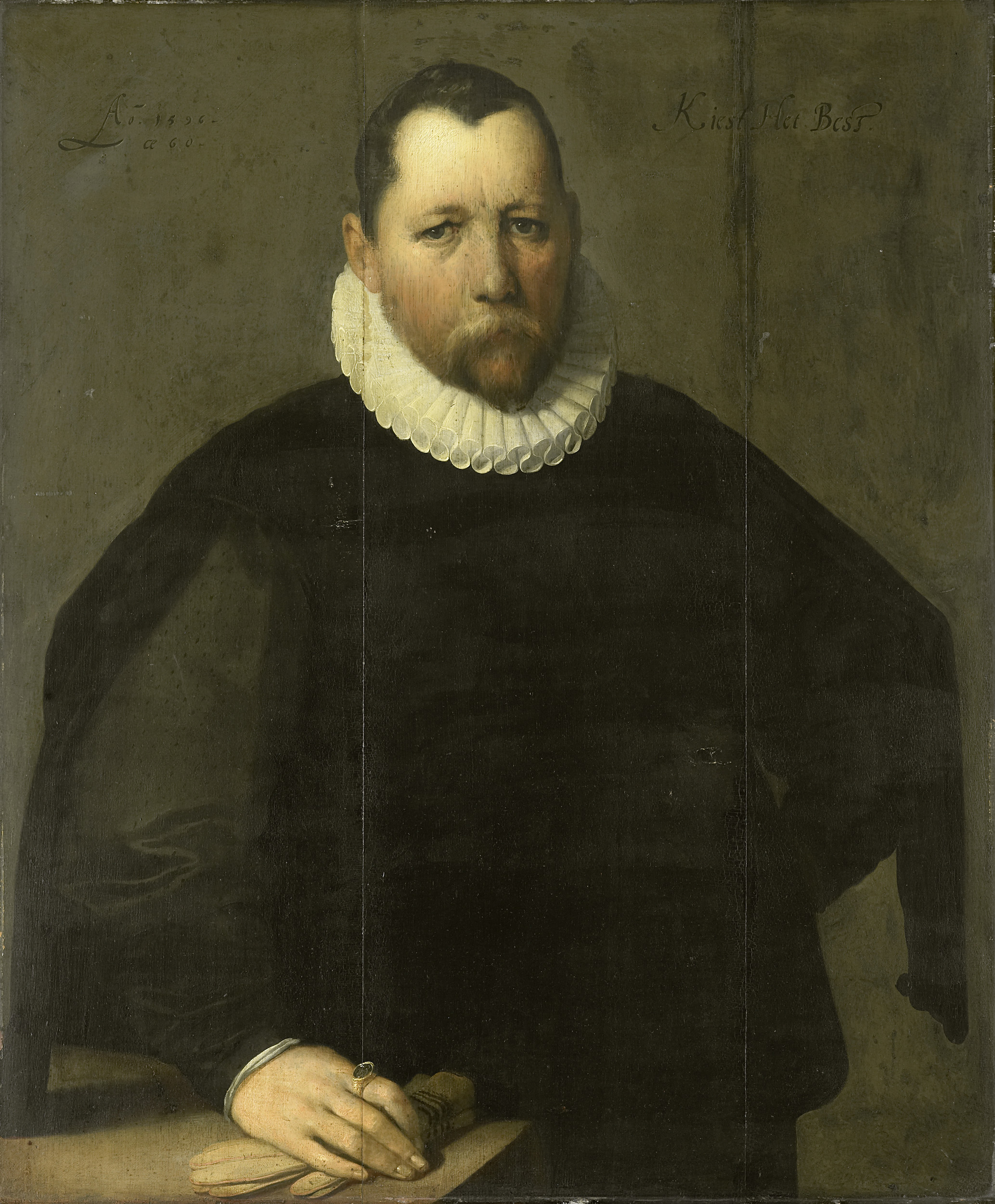
Portrait of Pieter Jansz Kies (1596)

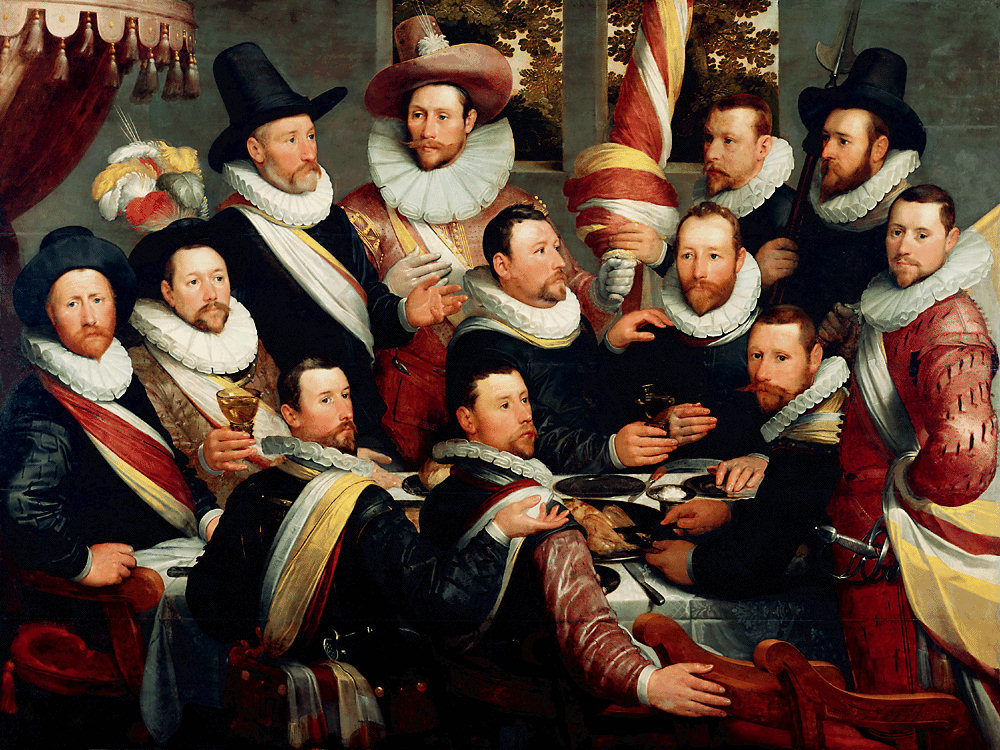
Banquet of the Officers of the Company of St. George (1599)

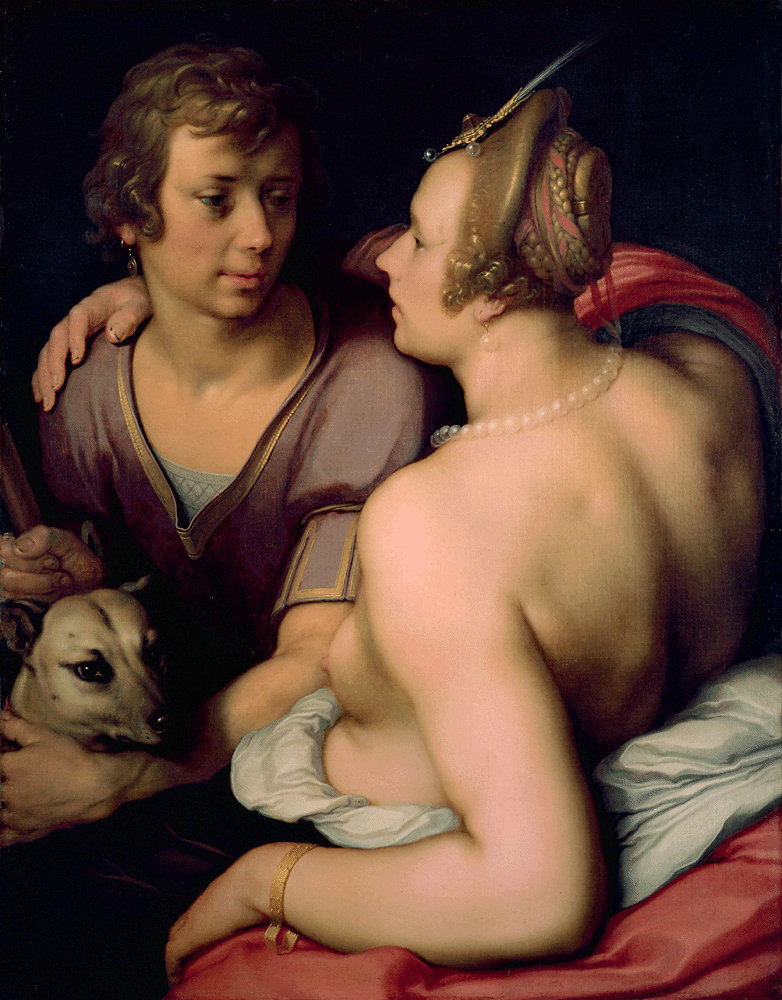
Venus and Adonis (1614)

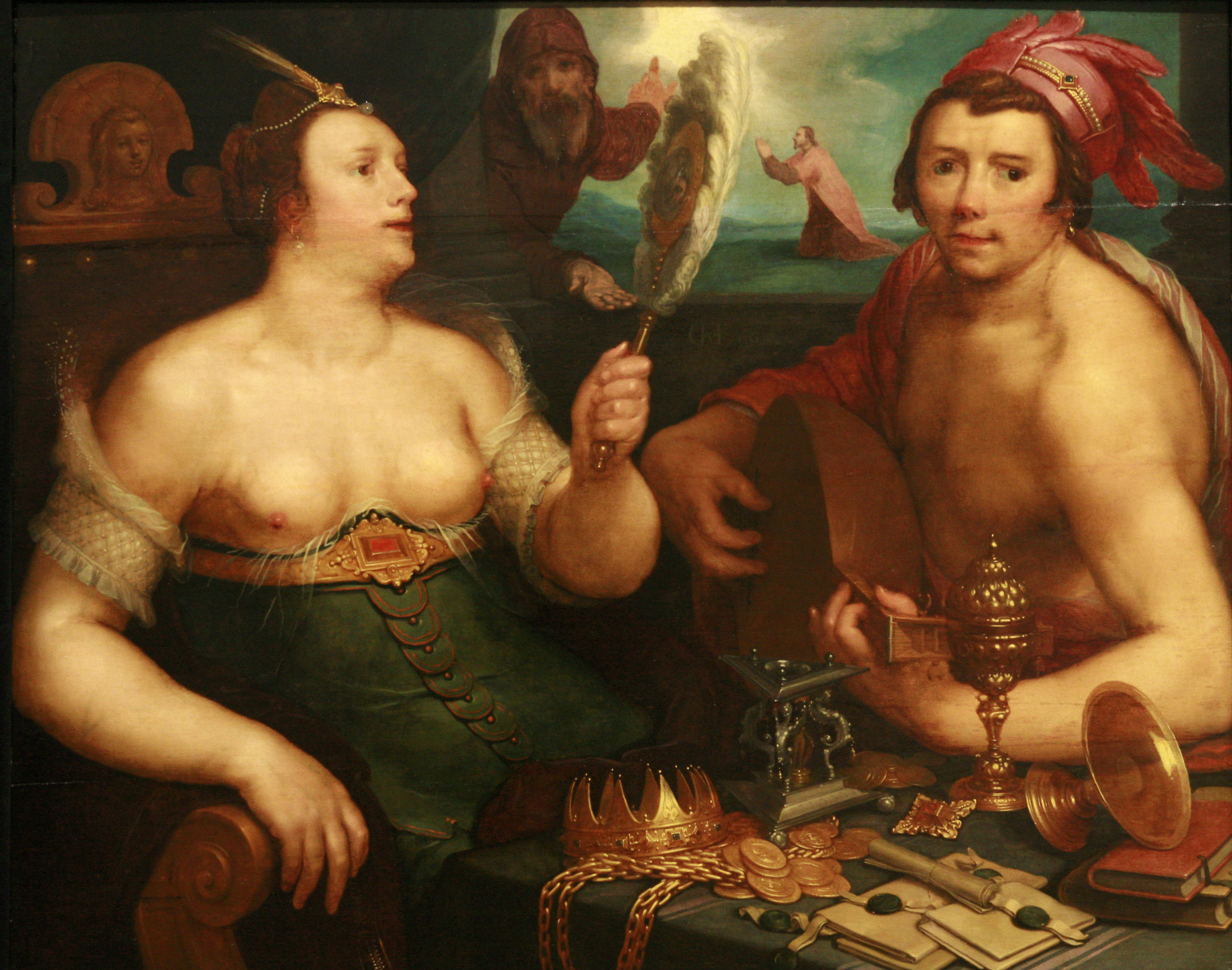
Allegory of Vanity and Repentance (1616) (oil on panel)

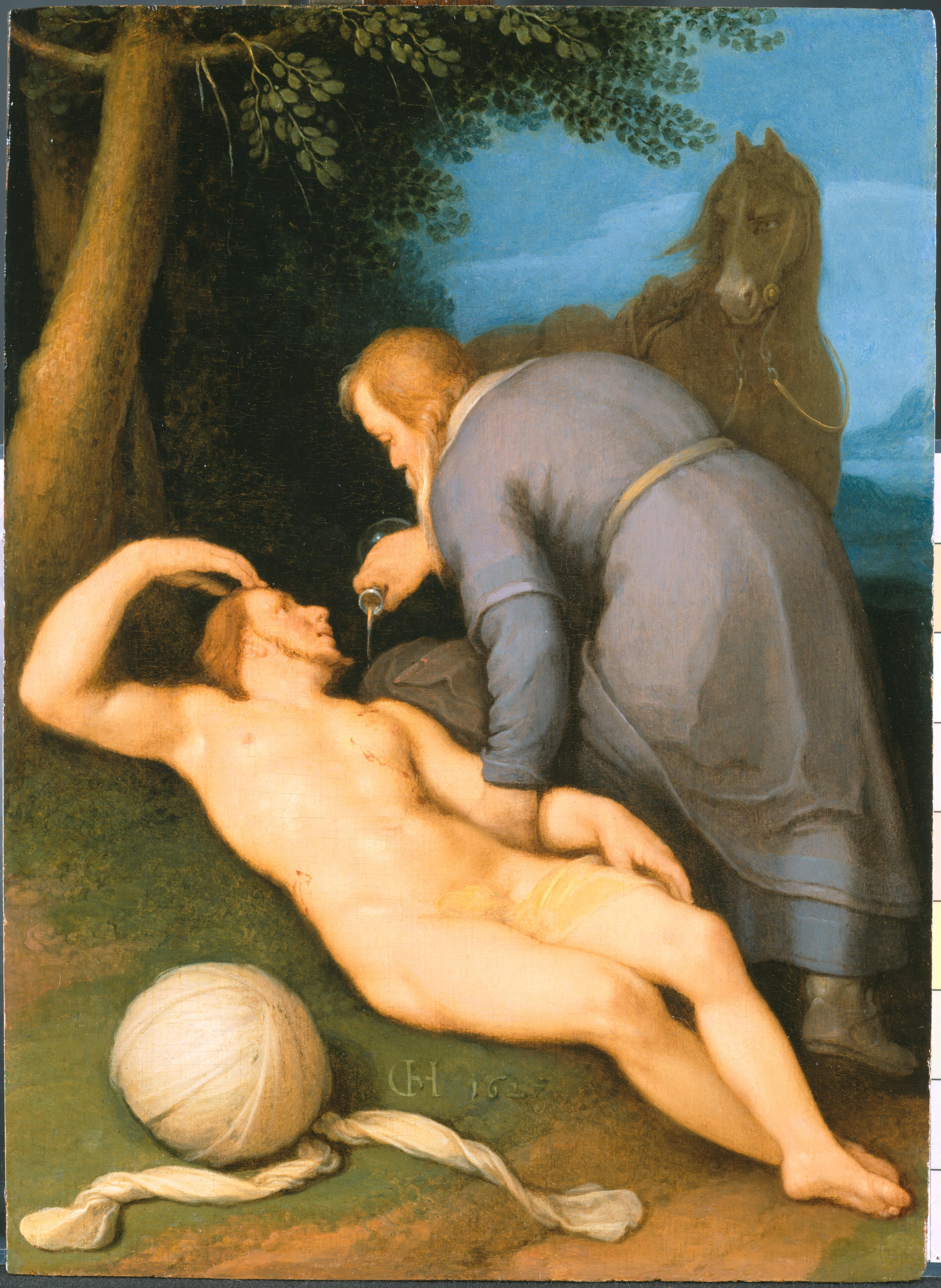
The Good Samaritan (1627) (oil on panel)
