= Cardinal Albert of Brandenburg before Christ on the Cross =

Painting by Lucas Cranach the Elder

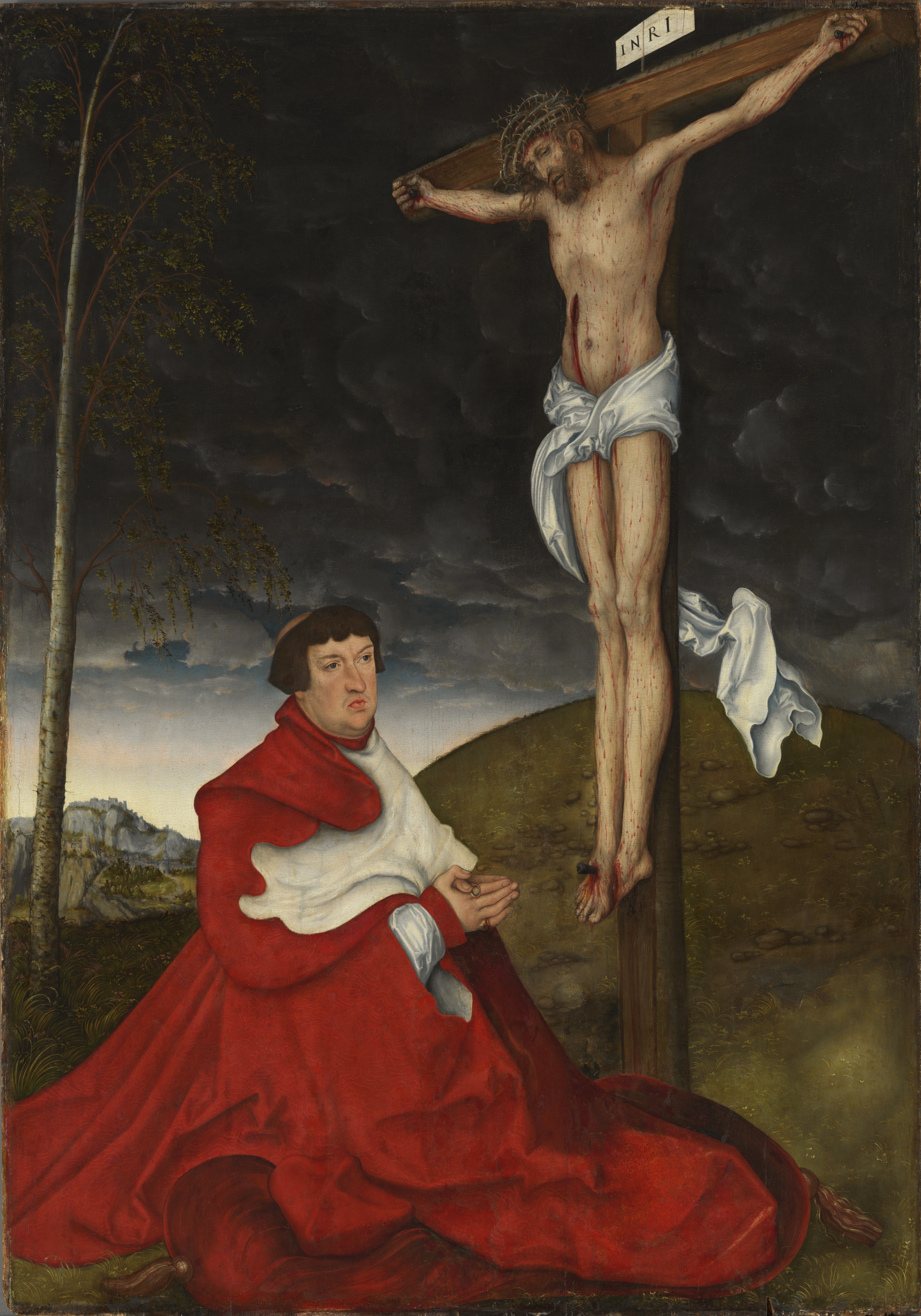
Albrecht-v-Brandenburg-1520-1525

Cardinal Albert of Brandenburg before Christ on the Cross is a painting by Lucas Cranach the Elder. It is dated 1520–1530. It was executed with oil on firs and measures 158 cm in height and 112 cm in width. Originally belonging to the Collegiate Church of Aschaffenburg, it passed in 1829 to the Alte Pinakothek in Munich, where it is shown with the title Kardinal Albrecht von Brandenburg vor dem Gekreuzigten kniend.
