= 1501 in art =

Events from the year 1501 in art.

== Works ==
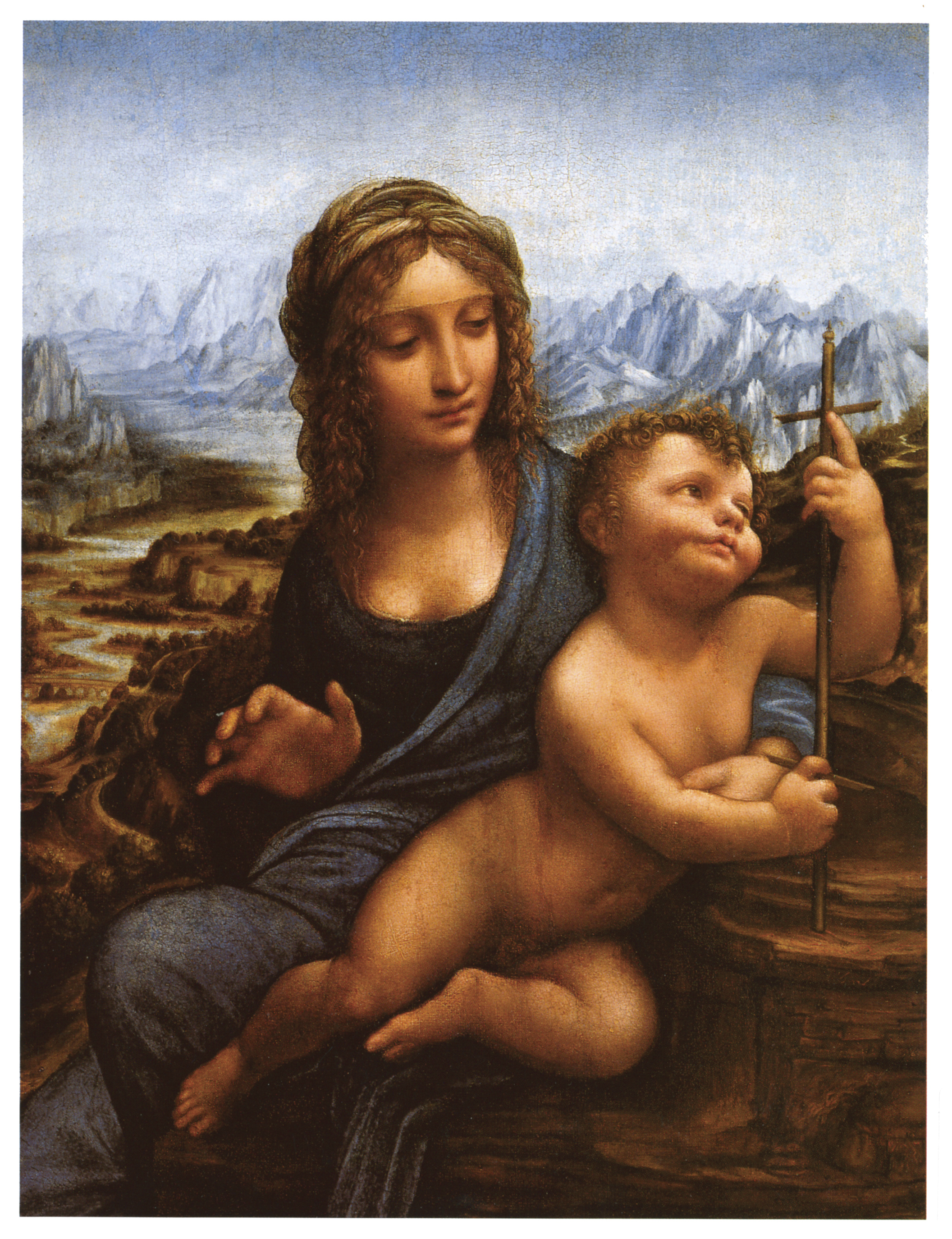
Leonardo, Madonna of the Yarnwinder

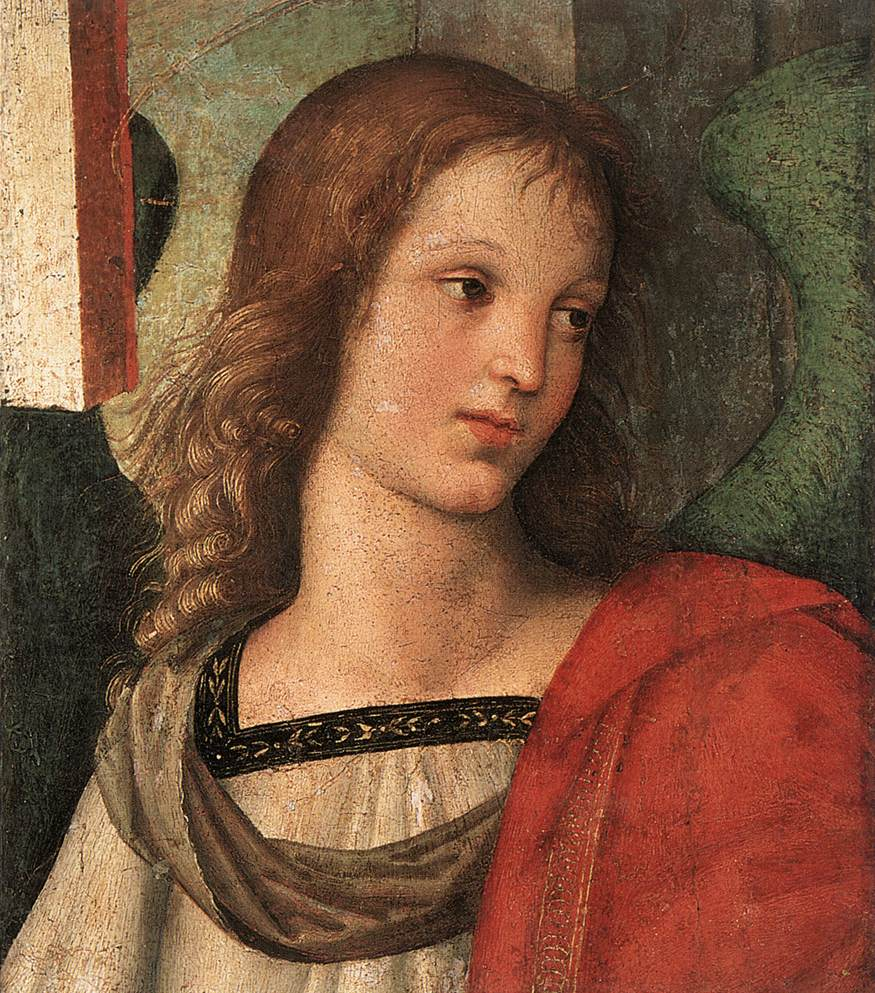
Raphael, Baronci Altarpiece

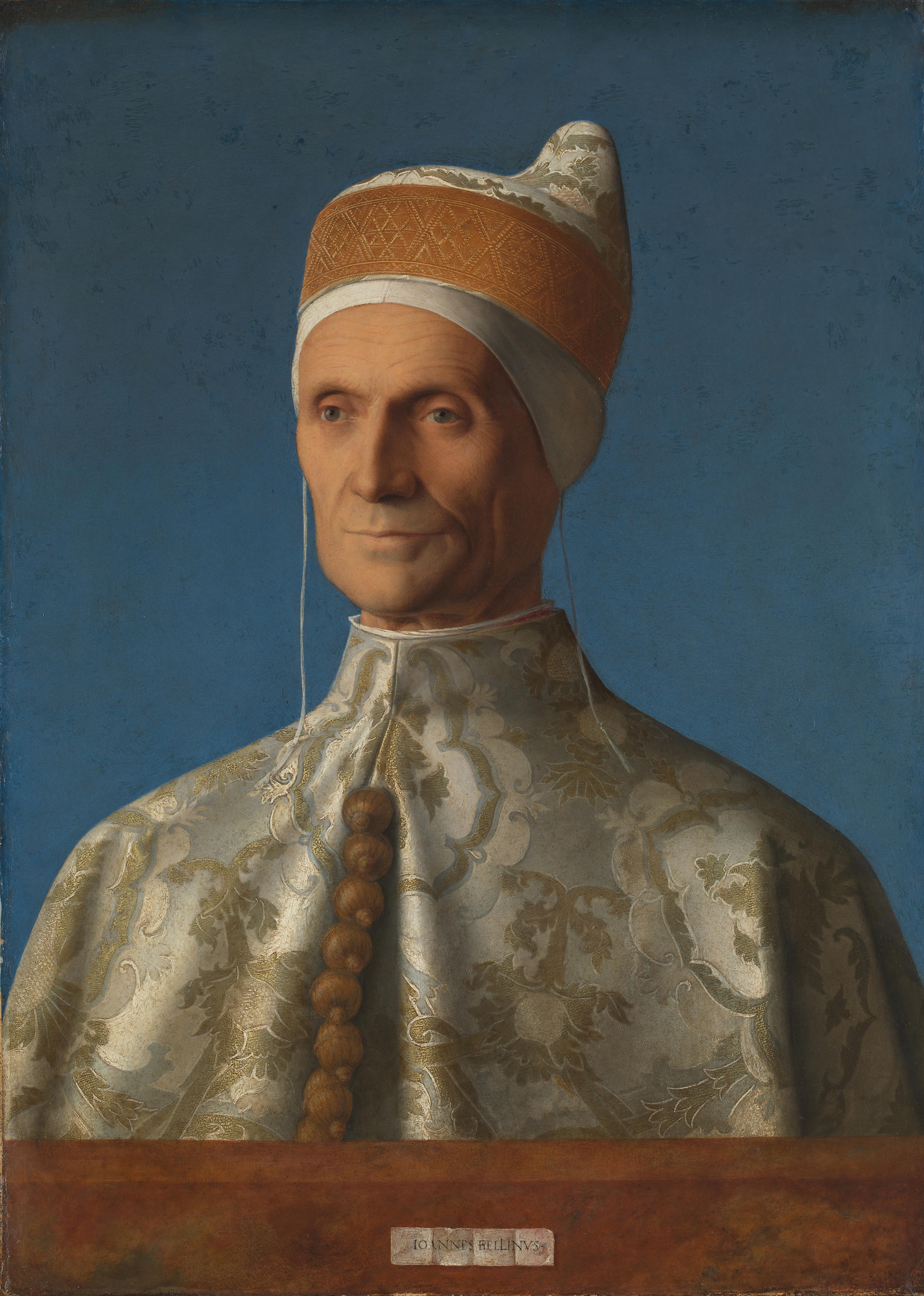
Bellini, Leonardo Loredan
- Giovanni Bellini – Portrait of Doge Leonardo Loredan
- Giorgione – The Three Ages of Man
- Leonardo da Vinci – Madonna of the Yarnwinder
- Raphael – Baronci Altarpiece

== Births ==
- date unknown
  - Girolamo da Carpi, court painter and decorator to the Duke d'Este (died 1556)
  - Perino del Vaga, Italian painter (died 1547)
  - Wang Guxiang, Chinese landscape painter during the Ming Dynasty (died 1568)
  - Wen Jia, Chinese painter of landscapes and flowers during the Ming Dynasty (died 1583)

== Deaths ==
- Gil de Siloé, Spanish Gothic sculptor of Flemish origin (born 1440)
- Bartolomeo di Giovanni, early renaissance Italian painter of the Florentine School (b. unknown)
- Ali-Shir Nava'i, Central Asian politician, mystic, linguist, painter and poet (born 1441)
- Antonio Rinaldeschi, Italian gambler, executed for throwing dung at a painting of the Virgin Mary above the doorway of the church of Santa Maria degli Alberghi in Florence (born unknown)
- 1501/1502 – Vittorio Crivelli, Italian painter (born 1440)
