= 1568 in art =

List of years in art	(table)
- … 1558; 1559; 1560; 1561; 1562; 1563; 1564; 1565; 1566; 1567; 1568; 1569; 1570; 1571; 1572; 1573; 1574; 1575; 1576; 1577; 1578 …
- Art; Archaeology; Architecture; Literature; Music; Philosophy; Science; +...

Events from the year 1568 in art.

== Events ==
- A new, enlarged edition of Giorgio Vasari's Lives of the Most Excellent Painters, Sculptors, and Architects is published, including a new section on Leonardo da Vinci.

== Works ==
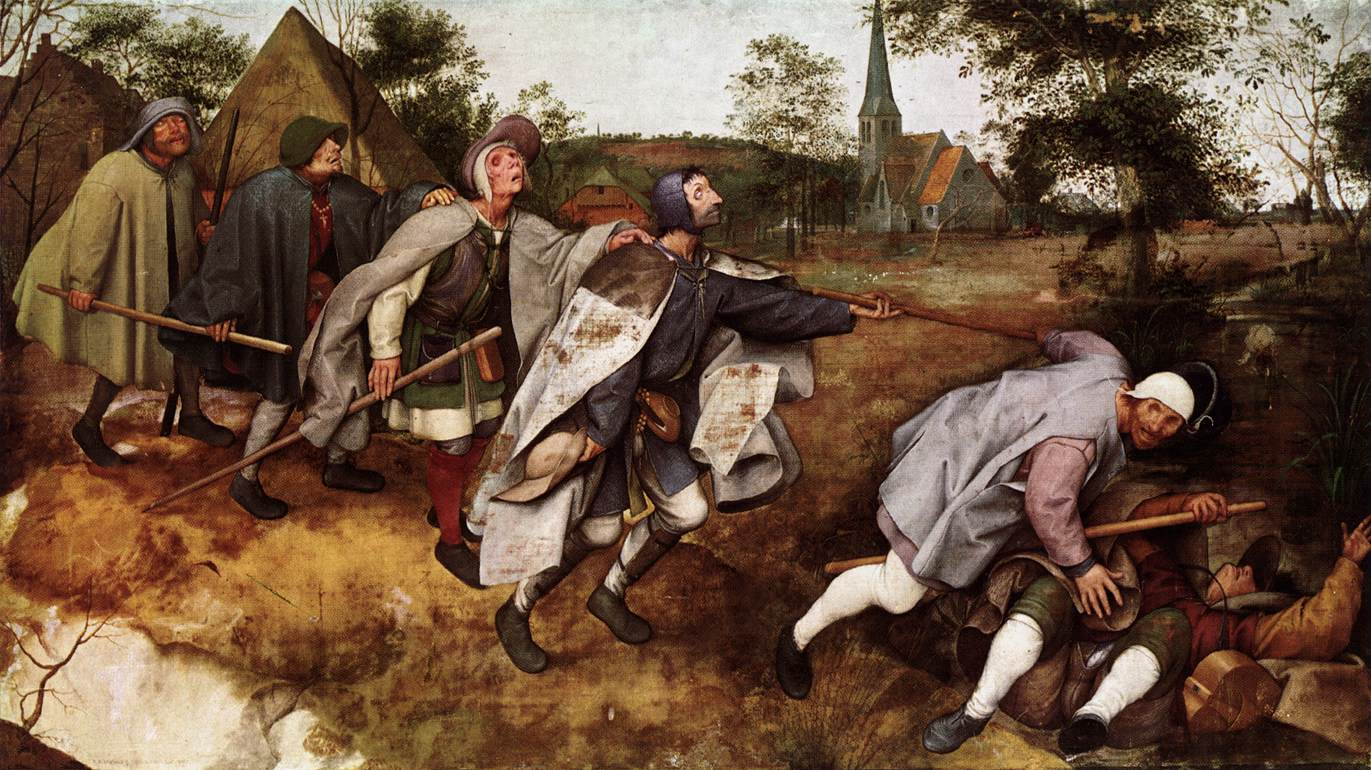
Bruegel, The Blind Leading the Blind

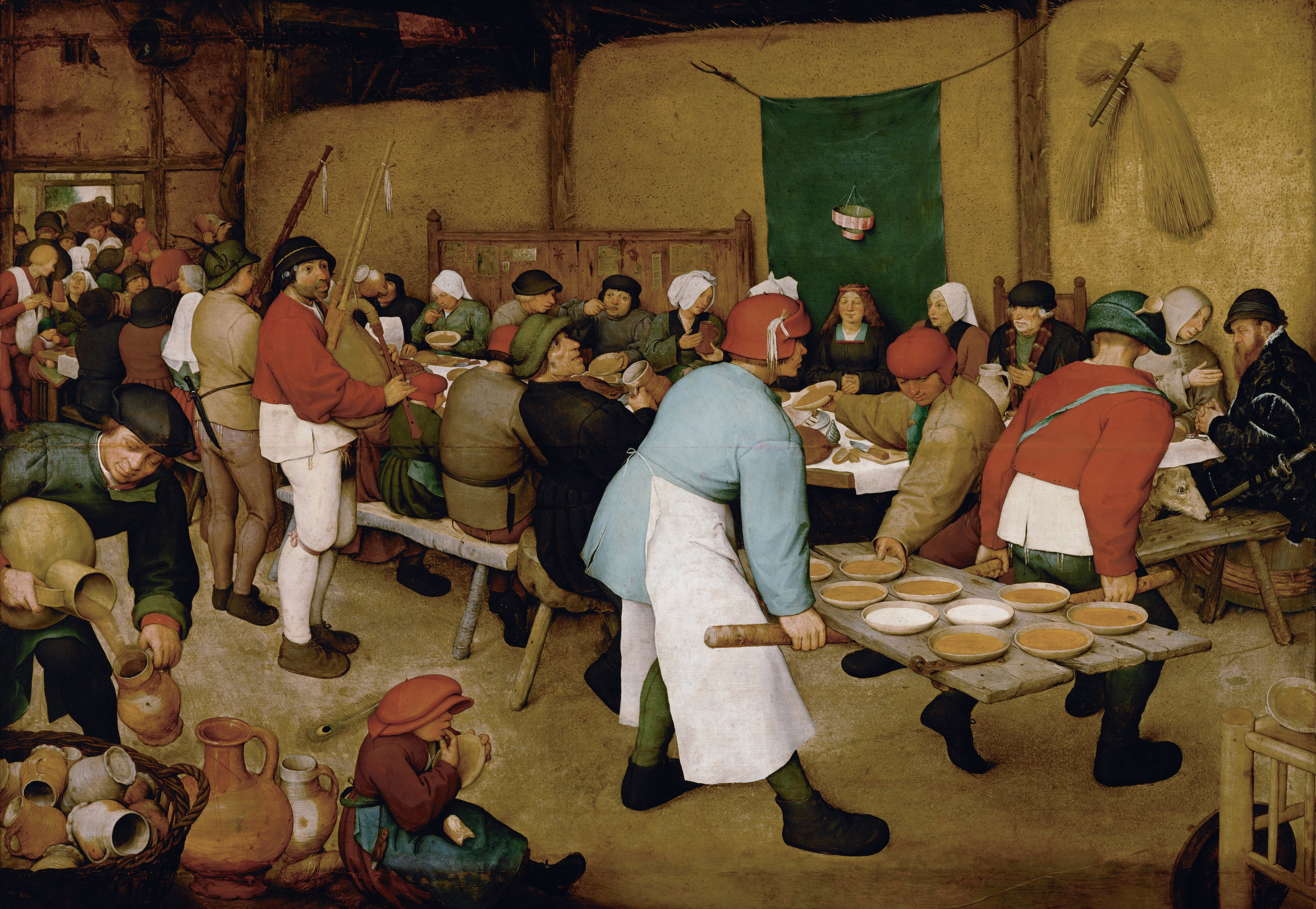
Bruegel, The Peasant Wedding

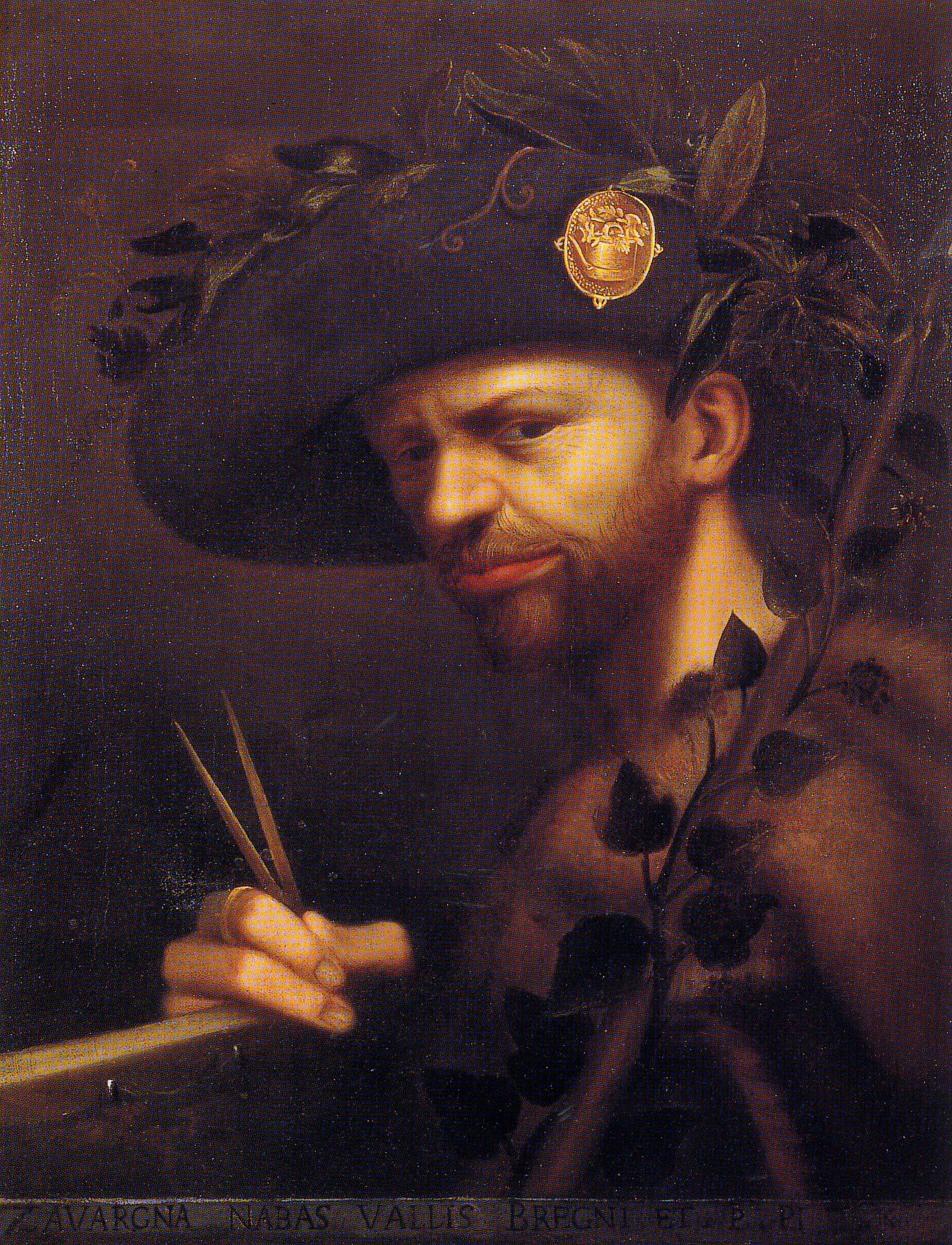
Gian Paolo Lomazzo, Self-portrait

=== Paintings ===
- Pieter Bruegel the Elder
  - The Blind Leading the Blind
  - The Peasant Wedding
  - The Tower of Babel
- El Greco – The Last Supper
- Gian Paolo Lomazzo – Self-portrait

== Births ==
- January 20 - Ventura Salimbeni, Italian Mannerist painter and printmaker (died 1613)
- March 16 - Juan Martínez Montañés, also known as el Dios de la Madera, Spanish sculptor (died 1649)
- May 9 - Guglielmo Caccia called il Moncalvo, Italian painter who specialised in altar-pieces (died 1625)
- date unknown
  - Alessandro Albini, Italian painter of the early Baroque period (died 1646)
  - Jan Brueghel the Elder, Flemish painter (died 1625)
  - Giovanni Battista Calandra, Italian mosaic artist (died c.1644)
  - Vincenzo Carducci, Italian painter (died 1638)
  - Andrés de la Concha, Spanish painter (died unknown)
  - Adam van Vianen, Dutch Golden Age medallist, engraver and silversmith (died 1627)
- probable
  - Giuseppe Cesari, known as the Cavaliere d'Arpino, Italian painter (died 1640)

== Deaths ==
- June 5 - Willem Key, Flemish painter (born 1515)
- date unknown
  - Pierre Bontemps, French sculptor (born 1505)
  - Battista del Moro, Italian painter of the Renaissance period active in his native Verona (born 1512)
  - Lodovico Dolce, Italian art theorist (born 1508/1510)
  - Lucas Gassel, Flemish painter (born 1490)
  - Vincenzo Pagani, Italian painter (born 1490)
  - Luis de Vargas, Spanish painter (born 1502)
  - Wang Guxiang, Chinese landscape painter during the Ming Dynasty (born 1501)
  - 1568/1569 - Jacob Binck, German engraver and painter (born between 1490-1504)
