= Mond Crucifixion =

Painting by Raphael

Crucifixion with the Virgin, Saints and Angels
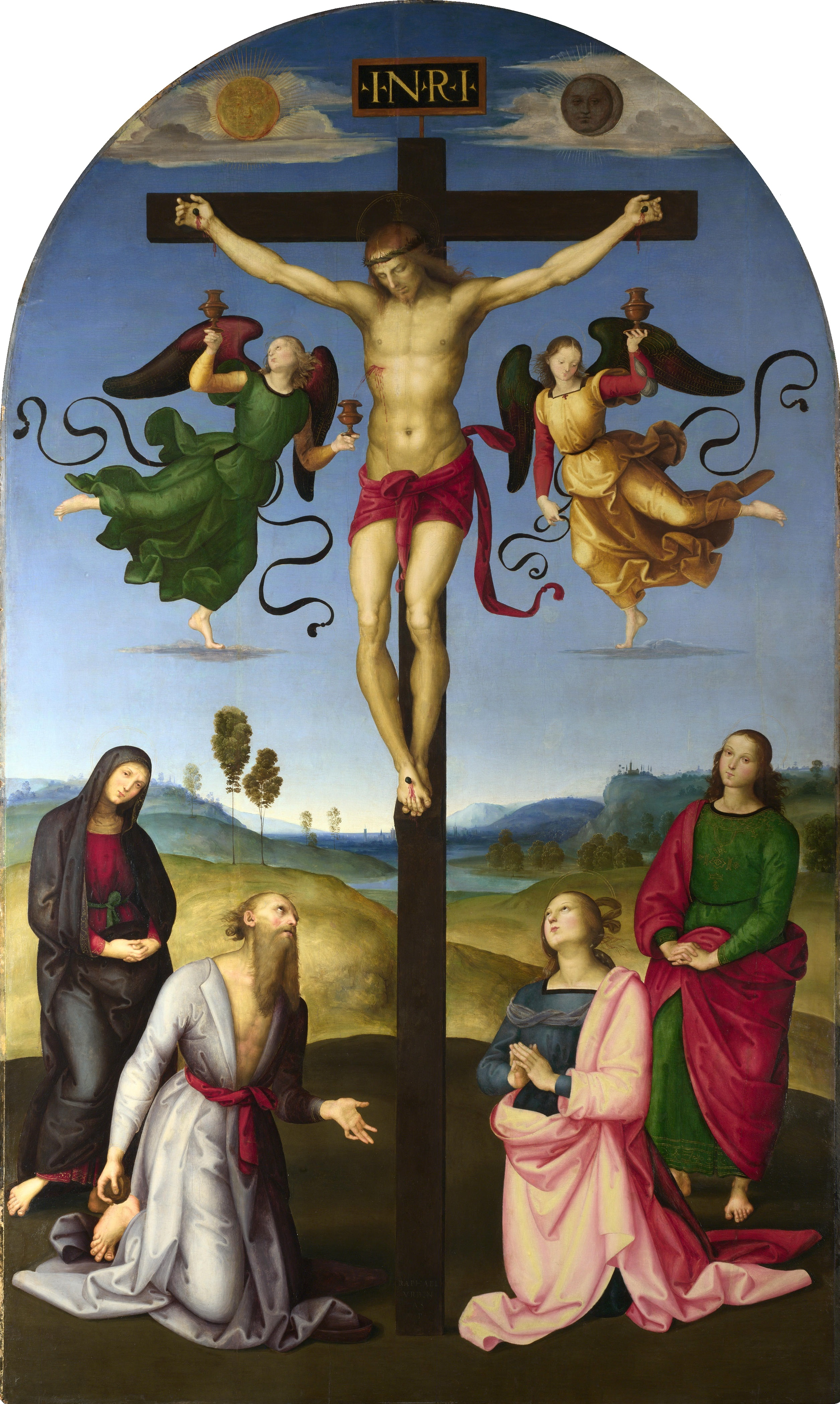
- Artist: Raphael
- Year: 1502–1503
- Type: Oil on poplar
- Dimensions: 283.3 cm × 167.3 cm (111.5 in × 65.9 in)
- Location: National Gallery, London

The Mond Crucifixion or Gavari Altarpiece is an oil on poplar panel dated to 1502–1503, making it one of the earliest works by Italian Renaissance artist Raphael, perhaps the second after the c.1499-1500 Baronci Altarpiece. It originally comprised four elements, of which three survive, now all separated: a main panel of the Crucified Christ with the Virgin Mary, Saints and Angels which was bequeathed to the National Gallery, London, by Ludwig Mond, and a three-panel predella from which one panel is lost; the two surviving panels are Eusebius of Cremona raising Three Men from the Dead with Saint Jerome's Cloak in the Museu Nacional de Arte Antiga, in Lisbon, and Saint Jerome saving Silvanus and punishing the Heretic Sabinianus in the North Carolina Museum of Art.

== Background ==
This early work by Raphael was commissioned by the wool merchant Domenico Gavari as the altarpiece for his burial chapel in the south aisle of the church of San Domenico in Città di Castello, in Umbria, near Raphael's home town of Urbino. The side chapel was dedicated to Saint Jerome, where most of the painting's original pietra serena stone frame survives including the inscribed date 1503. Gavari was an associate of Andrea Baronci, for whom Raphael had already made the Baronci Altarpiece. Gavari's first son Girolamo (Jerome) died young.

== Main panel ==
The main panel portrays the Crucifixion of Jesus, against a background of hills in the Umbrian countryside, with a view of Città di Castello in the distance. Jesus looks peaceful even as he is dying on the cross, crowned with thorns and clad only in a loincloth that has an unusual red colour. Above, a sun in gold leaf and moon in silver leaf appear together in the sky. Two angels with flowing robes and scrolling ribbons at their waists, one floating to either side of the cross, are using gold chalices similar to communion vessels to catch the blood dripping from Jesus' nail-pierced hands and spurting from the wound in his side. To the proper right (Jesus' left) kneels Mary Magdalene, with John the Evangelist standing behind her. To the proper left (Jesus' right) his mother Mary stands behind the kneeling Saint Jerome, who is holding a stone with which the hermit would piously beat his own chest.

The two kneeling figures are both reverently contemplating Jesus on the cross, while the two standing figures are wringing their hands while looking out at the viewer. A panel at the top of the cross bears the inscription "INRI", while the foot of the cross bears a Latin inscription in silver letters: "RAPHAEL/ VRBIN / AS /.P.[INXIT]" ("Raphael of Urbino painted this"). The work is lit from the left, consistent with the illumination of the altarpiece by the windows in the chapel.

The main panel measures 283.3 cm × 167.3 cm (111.5 in × 65.9 in) and is now housed in a 19th-century frame. The geometrical precision of the composition suggest it was laid out using a grid, using a rule and compasses to copy from a preparatory drawings. A drawing of a kneeling person, perhaps a study for the figure of Mary Magdalene, is held by the Ashmolean Museum in Oxford.

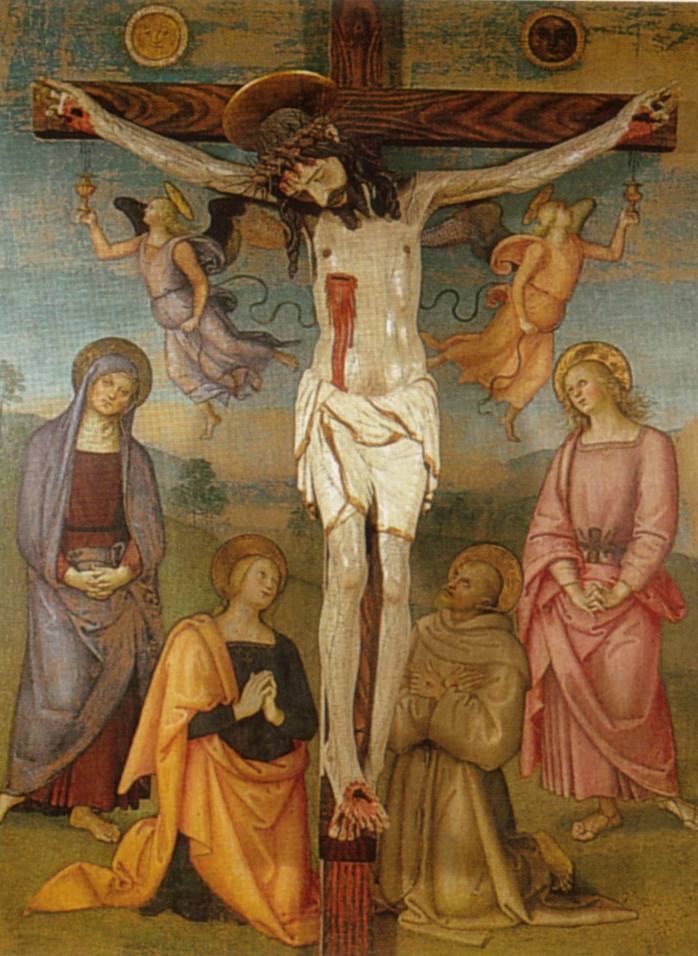
Perugino's Monteripido Altarpiece, completed 1502, Galleria Nazionale dell'Umbria, Perugia

The painting was influenced by Perugino, whom Raphael knew while living in Perugia. It is similar to Perugino's c.1502 Monteripido Altarpiece, made the convent of San Francesco al Monte at Monteripido near Perugia, a similar crucifixion scene which has two similar angels with ribbons catching the blood of Jesus is chalices, accompanied by four figures, two standing and two kneeling, including the Virgin Mary, John the Evangelist, and Mary Magdalene, but the fourth is Francis of Assisi rather than Saint Jerome. In the Mond Crucifixion, Raphael has used Perugino's technique of cross-hatched shadows, but also used his fingers to smear and soften the wet paint in places, leaving some detectable fingerprints. Vasari later famously commented that no one would have believed it was painted by Raphael rather than Perugino if he had not signed it.

== Predella ==
The two surviving panels of the predella each measure approximately 26 cm × 43 cm (10 in × 17 in) and depict miracles from the life story of Saint Jerome from the Hierominianum of Giovanni d'Andrea. Saint Jerome lived in the late 4th and early 5th century AD, so he could not have attended the crucifixion, but he is portrayed here as the patron saint of the chapel.

One of the surviving predella panels has been in the Museu Nacional de Arte Antiga in Lisbon since 1866. It depicts Eusebius of Cremona raising Three Men from the Dead with Saint Jerome's Cloak Eusebius of Cremona was a close associate and active supporter of Jerome against the teachings of Origen.

The other surviving predella panel is in the North Carolina Museum of Art in Raleigh, North Carolina. It depicts Saint Jerome saving Silvanus and punishing the Heretic Sabinianus. Saint Jerome is holding back the arm of the executioner ready to behead bishop Silvanus, but the heretic Sabinianus has been miraculously decapitated instead.

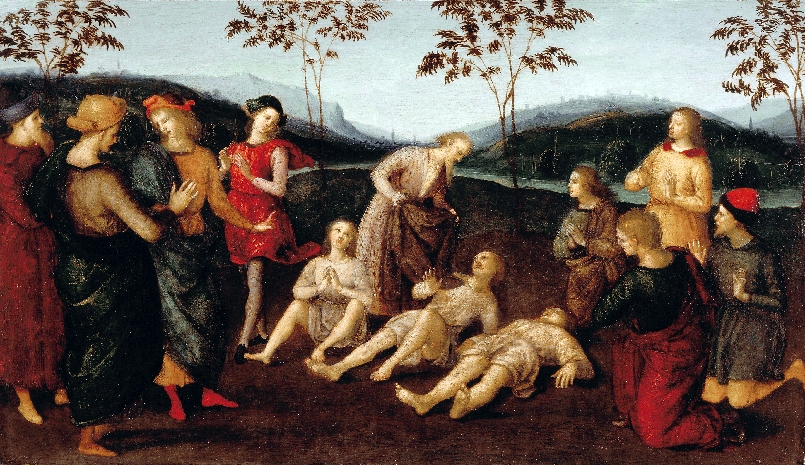
Eusebius of Cremona raising Three Men from the Dead with Saint Jerome's Cloak, Museu Nacional de Arte Antiga, Lisbon

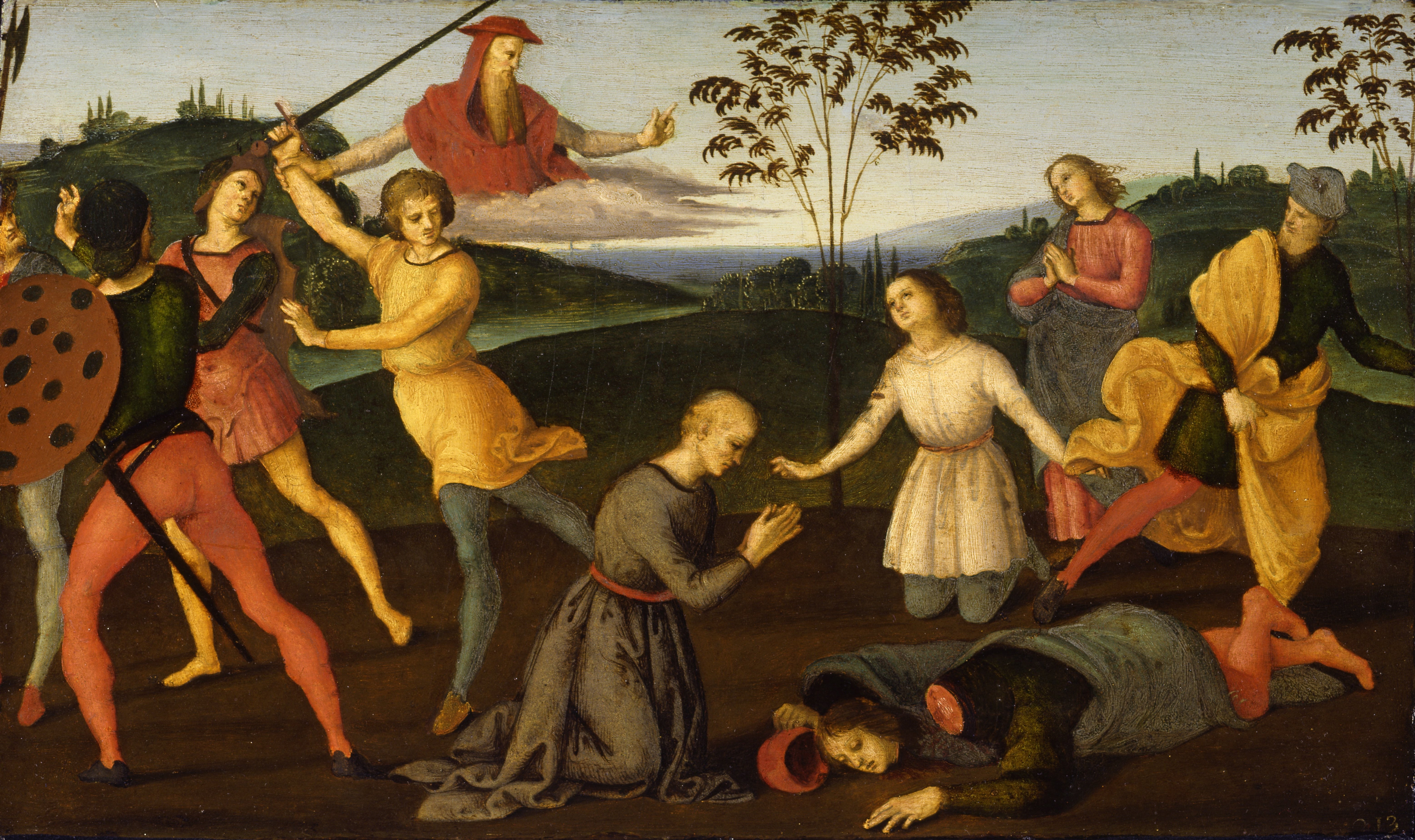
Saint Jerome saving Silvanus and punishing the Heretic Sabinianus, North Carolina Museum of Art, Raleigh, North Carolina

== Provenance ==
The main panel was bought by Cardinal Fesch in 1808 for 2500 scudi, and replaced in the chapel by a copy. At the Fesch sale in 1845, it was sold to the Principe di Canino, and quickly bought by Lord Ward (later Earl of Dudley). It was then inherited by William Ward, 2nd Earl of Dudley, and sold by him at Christie's in 1892 where it was purchased by Ludwig Mond, after whose death in 1909 it was acquired by the National Gallery in 1924.

The predella panels seem to have been removed in the 17th century, and given as gifts to a visiting cardinal. The panel in North Carolina was formerly in the collection of Sir Francis Cook at Doughty House, Richmond, London.

== Painting materials ==
The main panel was analyzed in the National Gallery London and the typical pigments of the Renaissance period were identified. He painted the Crucifixion among other pigments with natural ultramarine, lead-tin-yellow, verdigris, vermilion and ochres.

== See also ==
- List of paintings by Raphael

== Sources ==
- The Mond Crucifixion, Raphael, National Gallery, London
- Henry, Tom. "Raphael's Altar-Piece Patrons in Città Di Castello", The Burlington Magazine, vol. 144, no. 1190, 2002, pp. 268–278
