= Francesco Tifernate =

Italian painter

Francesco Tifernate also known as Francesco da Città di Castello (circa 1486 – ) was an Italian painter, active in his native Città di Castello and painting in a Renaissance style.

== Biography ==
He was born to a father who was a jeweler. It is not clear where he trained, but he clearly would have either met or encountered the contemporary works of Pietro Perugino and a young Raphael, both of whom had ties to his native town. He is known mainly for two extant altarpieces, both Annunciations made for churches in his native town. The Pala Malagotti (1506) was signed, dated and painted for the church of San Domenico; it is now in the Pinacoteca Comunale of Città di Castello. Francesco also appears to have painted another Annunciation for the Capella Uberti of the cathedral, it is presently displayed in the Museo del duomo di Città di Castello.
