= Baronci Altarpiece =

Painting by Raphael

St Nicolas of Tolentino treading on a devil
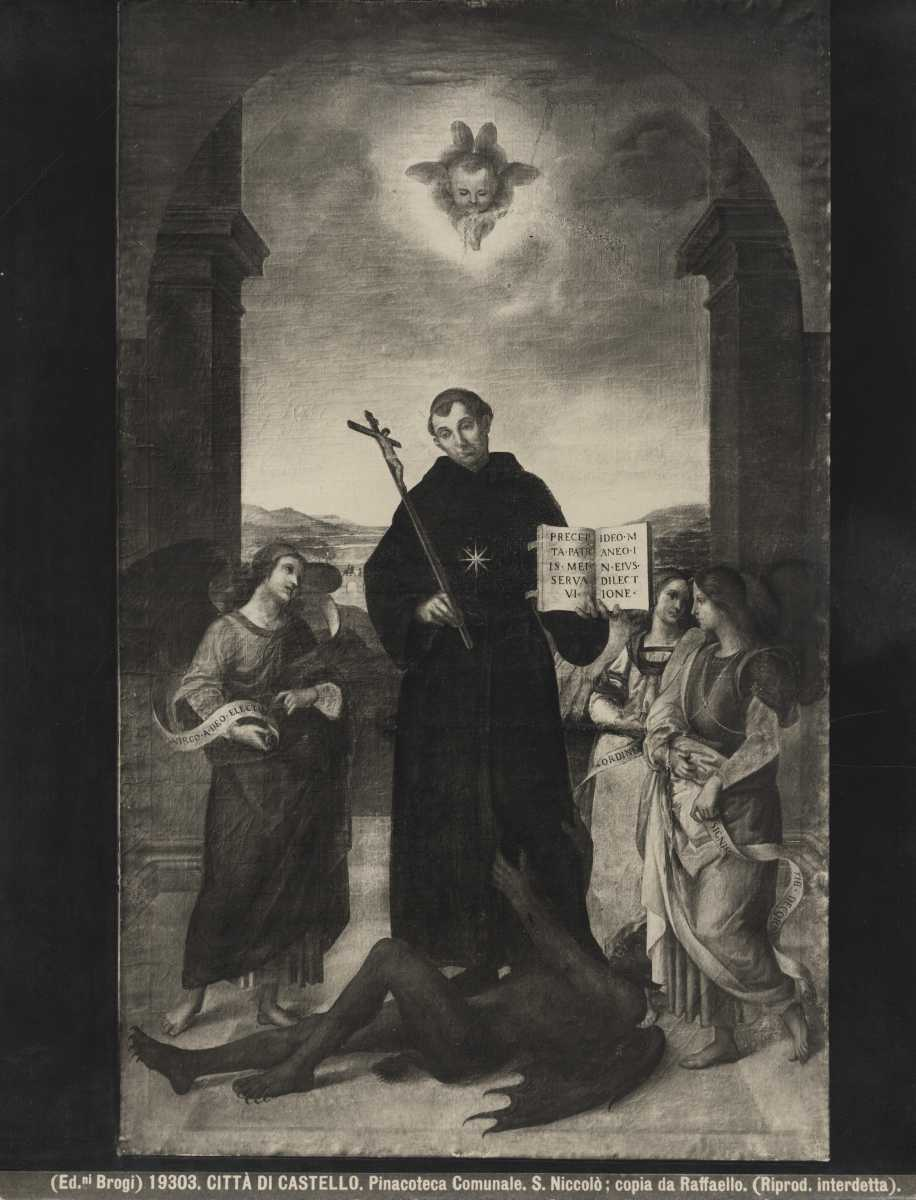
- Artist: Copy by Ermegildo Costantini (1791), after Raphael (1500–1501)
- Location: Pinacoteca Comunale, Città di Castello

The Baronci Altarpiece was a painting by the Italian High Renaissance artist Raphael. His first recorded commission, it was made for Andrea Baronci's chapel in the church of Sant'Agostino in Città di Castello, near Urbino. The altarpiece was seriously damaged during an earthquake in 1789, and since 1849 fragments of the original painting have been part of different collections.

== History ==
On December 10, 1500, Raphael and Evangelista da Pian di Meleto, an older painter from the workshop of Raphael's father Giovanni Santi, received the commission to paint jointly a large altarpiece dedicated to Saint Nicholas of Tolentino, for the Baronci chapel in the Sant'Agostino Church in Città di Castello. In the documents Raphael, not his collaborator, is referred to as magister ("master"). The work on the paintings was completed on September 13, 1501.

In the center of the painting Nicholas of Tolentino stood in an archway, with the devil at his feet. Next to him were three angels. Above him God the Father was placed with a crown in his hand, and surrounded by the heads of angels. On his left the Blessed Virgin Mary and Saint Augustine were painted.

During a heavy earthquake in 1789 the painting was damaged so severely that it was decided to saw it into pieces and display only the undamaged parts. In the same year, the fragments were acquired by Pope Pius VI for the collections of the Vatican, where they remained until 1849. It is unclear what happened to them after that. Only many years later scholars were able to trace back six different pieces, four fragments of the main painting and two predellas, which had become part of different collections.

An impression of the complete work is given by an 18th-century copy in the Pinacoteca Comunale, Città di Castello. However, this lacks some surviving elements, in particular the God the Father now in Naples. Preliminary sketches by Raphael can be found in the Palais des Beaux-Arts de Lille, Lille and the Ashmolean Museum, Oxford, which also differ from the composition in the copy. On the basis of these drawings it is assumed that the design of the altar was entirely Raphael's work, whereas in the execution he was joined by Evangelista da Pian di Meleto. While Raphael probably painted the altarpiece itself, the predellas are attributed to Pian di Meleto.

== Surviving fragments ==
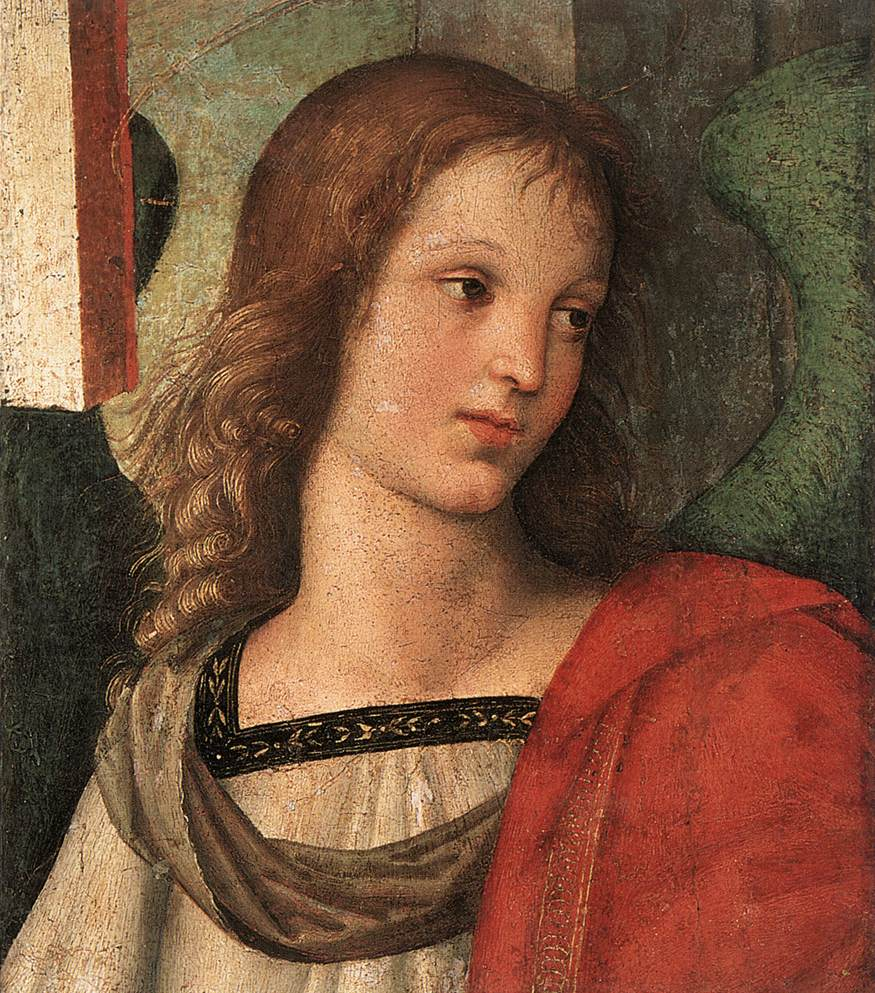
Angel (31 x 27 cm., Pinacoteca Tosio Martinengo, Brescia)

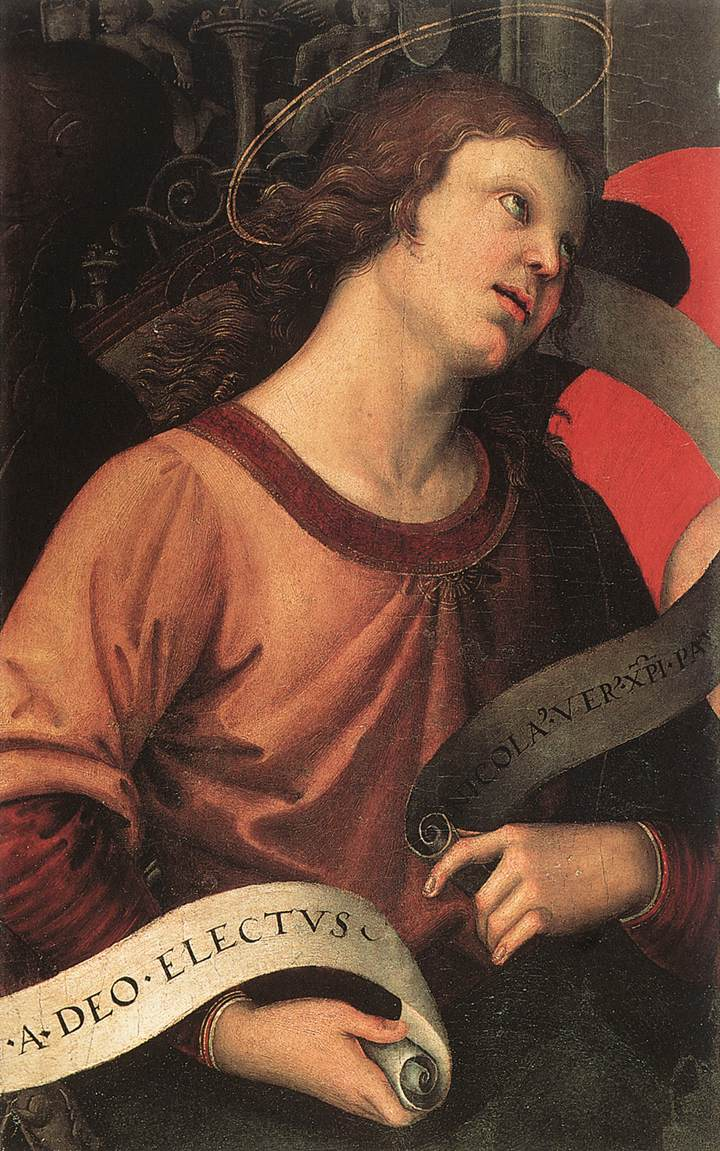
Angel Holding a Speech Scroll (57 x 36 cm., Louvre, Paris)

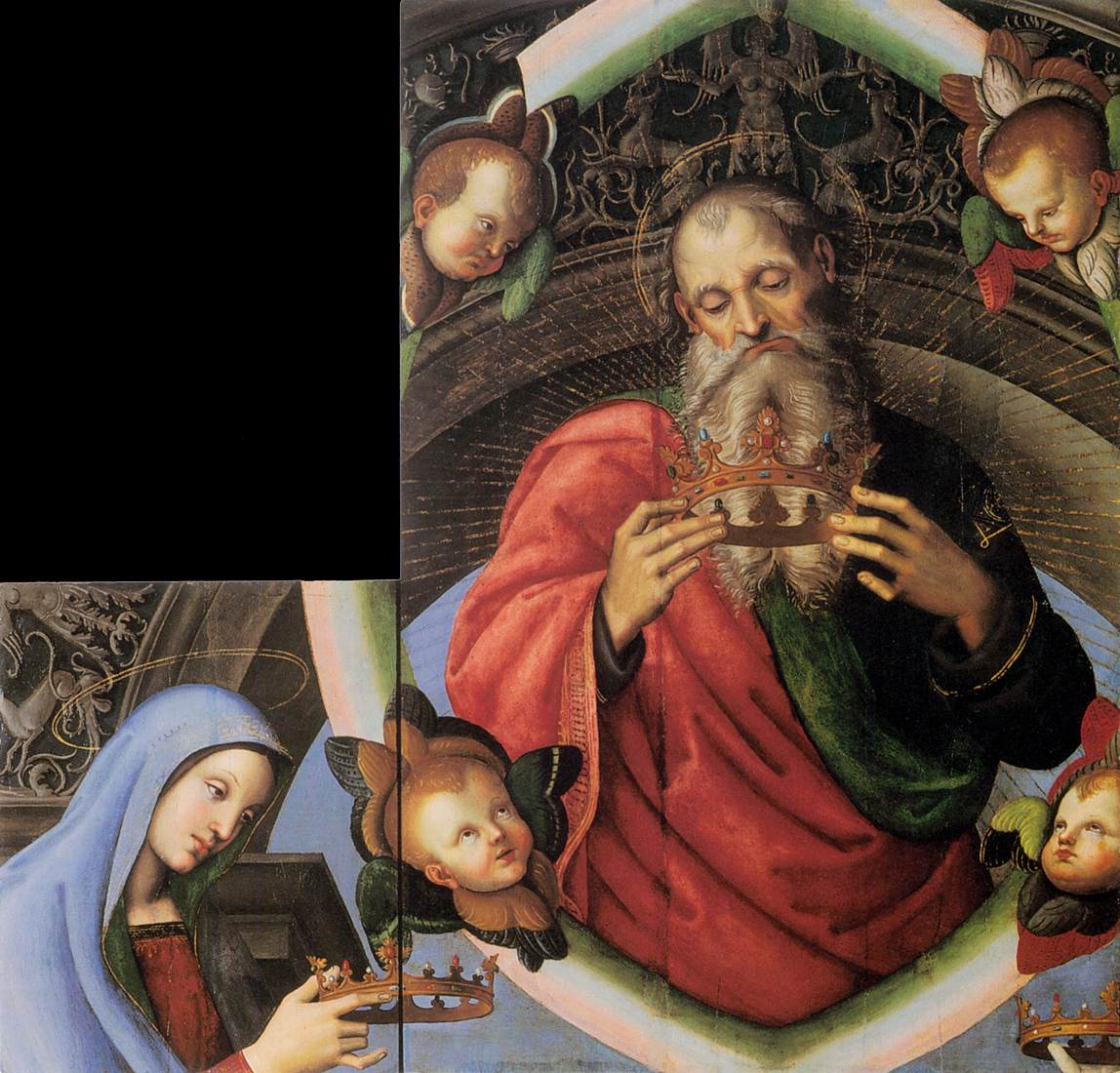
God the Father (112 x 75 cm.) and the Virgin Mary (51 x 41 cm.) (Museo di Capodimonte, Naples)

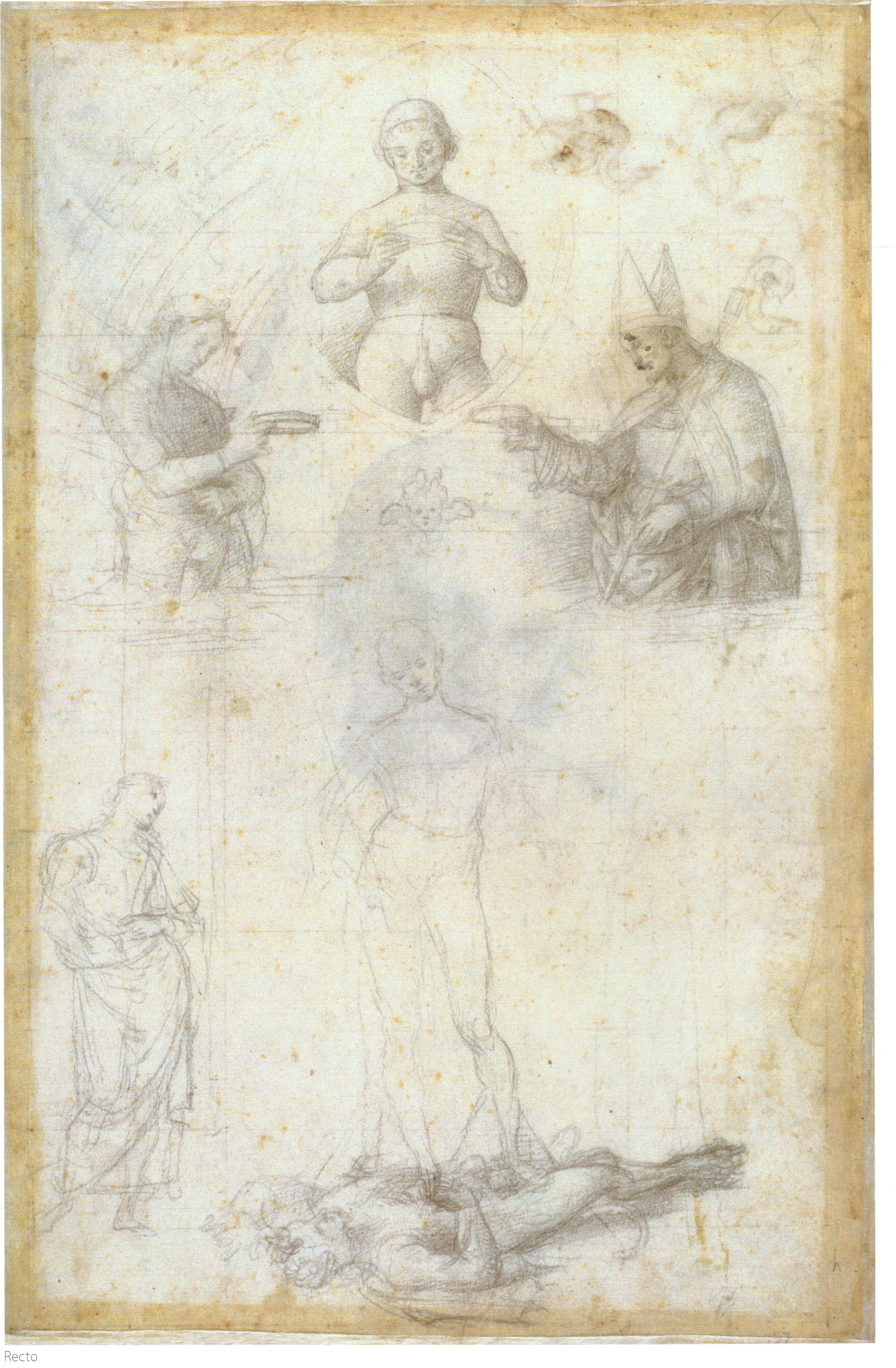
Study (Palais des Beaux-Arts de Lille)

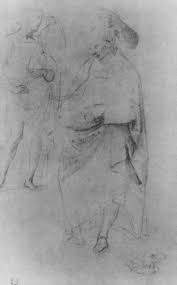
Study (Ashmolean Museum, Oxford)

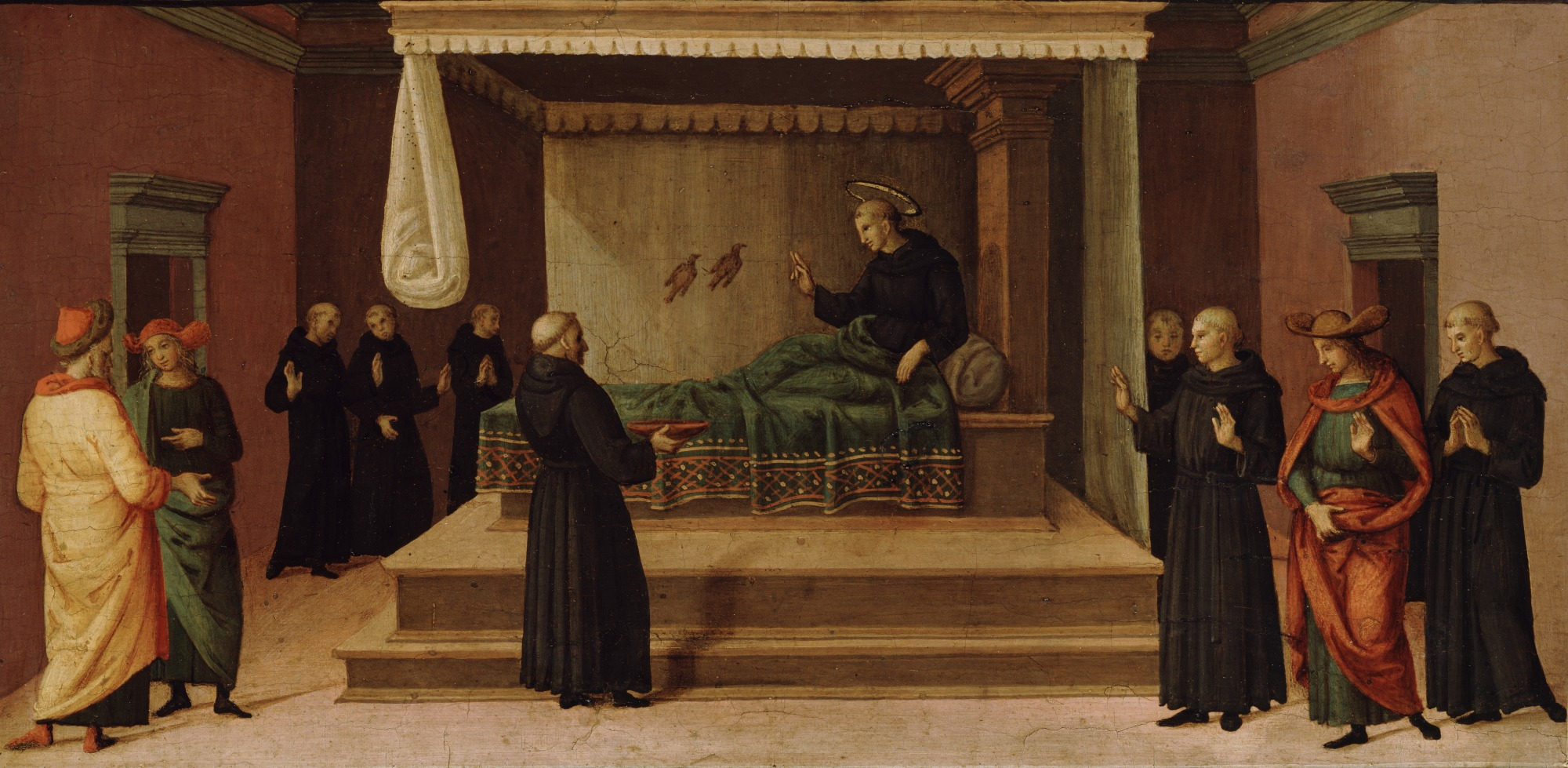
Saint Nicholas of Tolentino Reviving Two Partridges (29.2 x 54.0 cm., Detroit Institute of Arts)

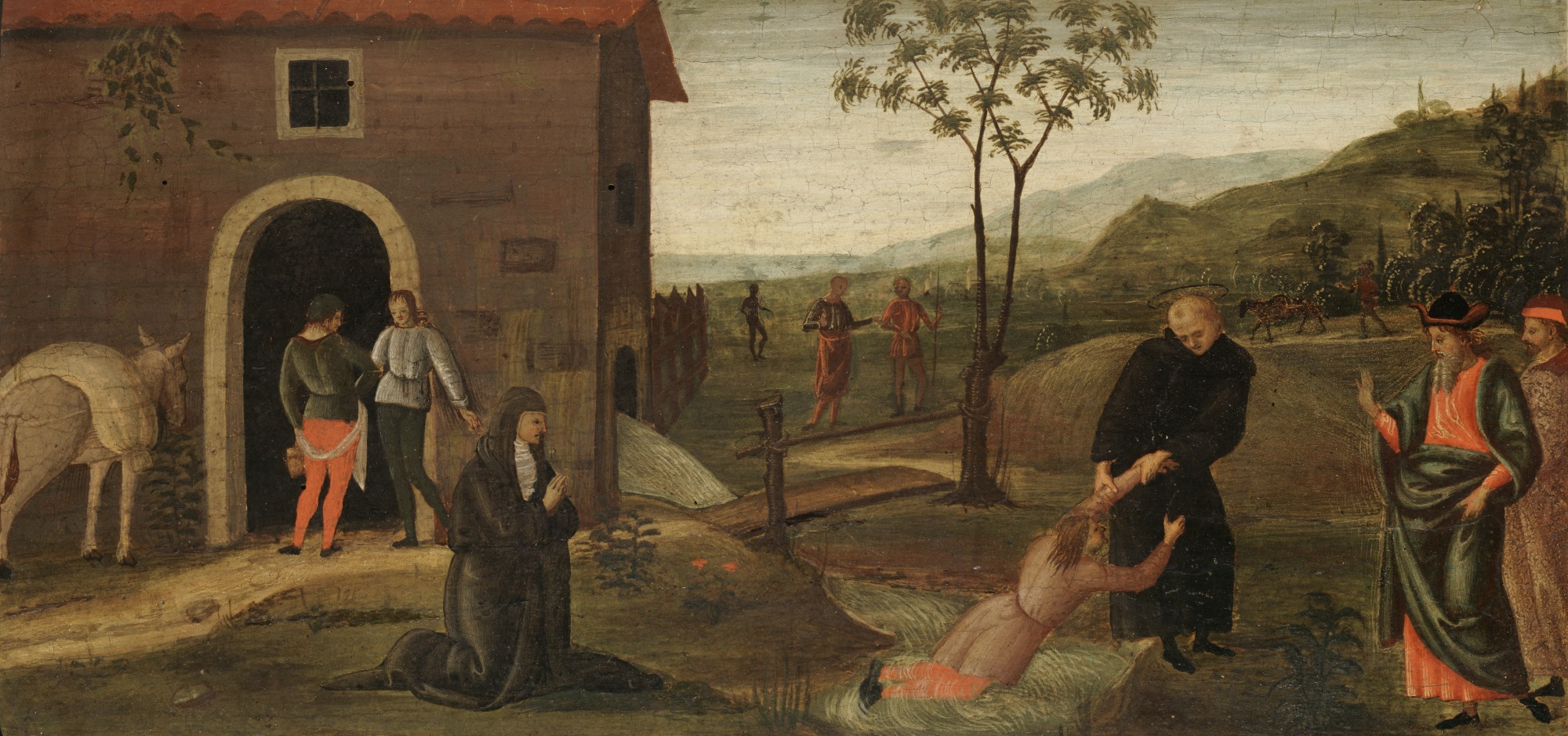
Saint Nicholas of Tolentino Rescuing a Boy from Drowning (26.7 x 51.8 cm., Detroit Institute of Arts)

== See also ==
- List of paintings by Raphael
