= Nuvolo =

Italian painter (1926–2008)

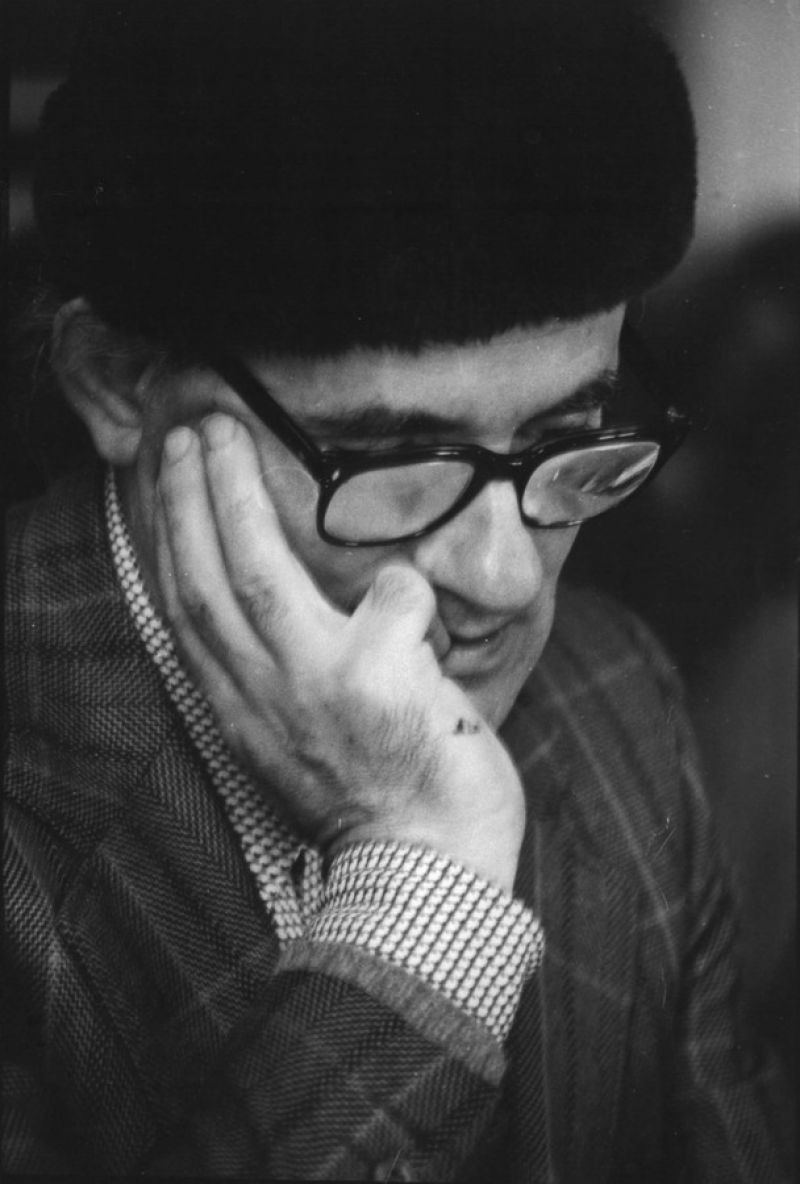
- Nuvolo (Giorgio Ascani), early Seventies
- Born: Giorgio Ascani; 12 October 1926; Città di Castello, Perugia, Italy
- Died: 10 October 2008 (aged 81); Città di Castello, Perugia, Italy
- Occupations: Artist, printer, fine-arts teacher

Nuvolo (born Giorgio Ascani, 12 October 1926 – 10 October 2008) was an Italian painter, pioneer of pictorial techniques applied to screen printing and computer graphics.

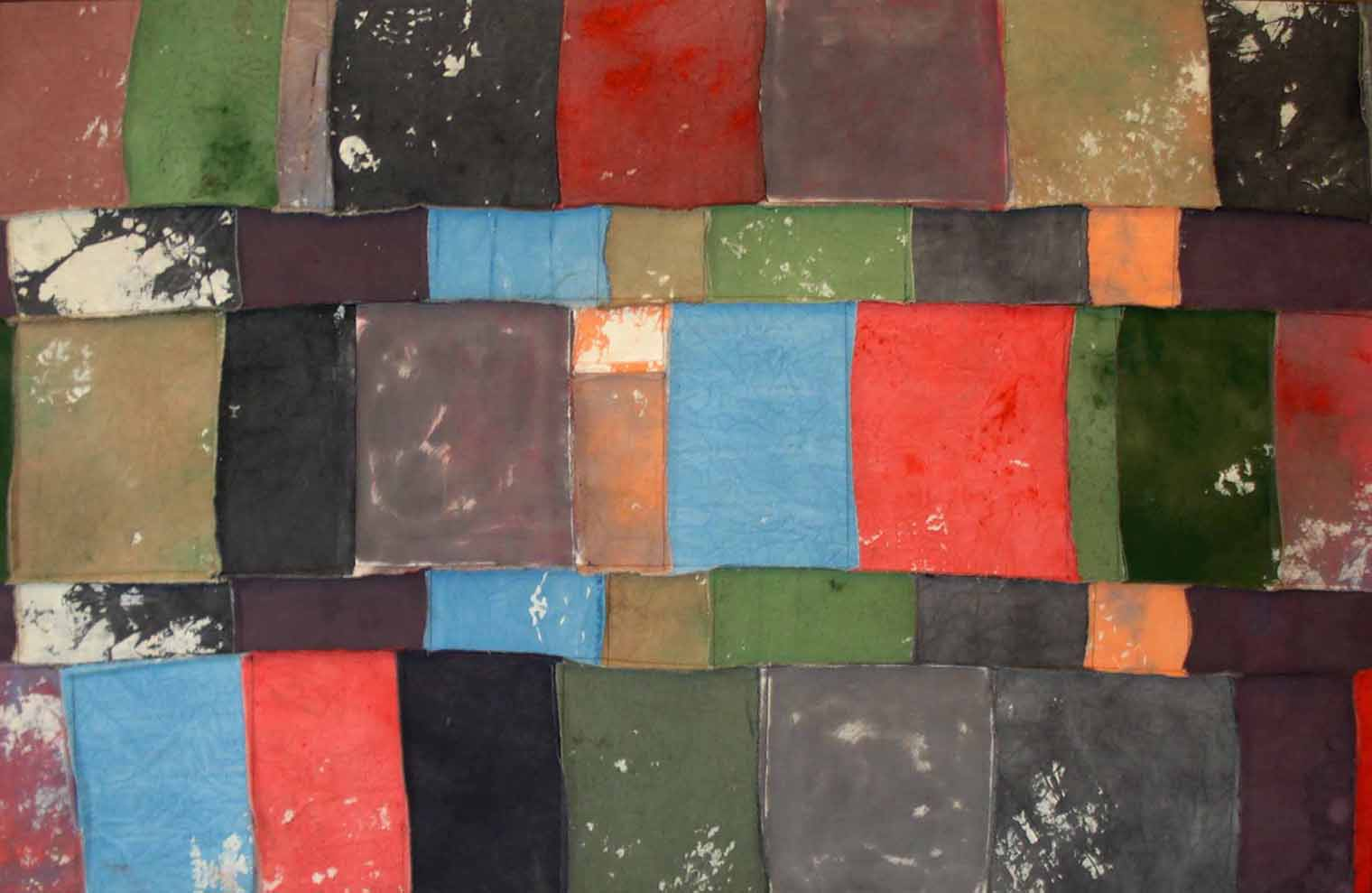
Nuvolo Cuciti a macchina

== Biography and works ==
=== Early life ===
Nuvolo was born 12 October 1926 in Città di Castello, one of the major centers for typographic industry in Italy. His parents involved him in their printing workshop early in his life. The nickname "Nuvolo" (cloud) was given to him during the Second World War, when as teenage partisan his peers compared his quick appearances to a sudden cloud in the sky.

As a young artisan in the first years after the war, he soon showed manual dexterity in various fields, from decoration to set design, and gradually he focused his attention on silkscreen and its potential uses, working either in his family workshop or at the local graphic arts school, where he found teachers who fostered his disposition toward exploration.

=== In Rome with Alberto Burri ===
In 1949, Nuvolo moved to Rome, at the suggestion of his friend and fellow countryman Alberto Burri. Nuvolo primarily became Burri's collaborator at his Via Margutta studio, matching his work as an advertising artist with a first series of screen printing, the first foray into the field of visual arts.

Although silk-screen tools were very poor at the time, he was the first in Italy, to adopt this technique for artistic goals. He created abstract figures by silk screen, uaing dichromate gel, adopted from the rotogravure-printing technique.

If in such graphic experiments he was initially influenced by his friend's matter research, Nuvolo would soon find his own creative autonomy in this medium as an innovator himself.

=== The "informal" climate ===
Working as an aide for Burri, Nuvolo got more and more in touch with a group of informal painting artists who characterized that decade. He associated with the (short-lived) "Gruppo Origine", founded between 1949 and 1950 and formed by Corrado Cagli, Giuseppe Capogrossi, Mario Balocco, Ettore Colla and Burri himself, sharing an interest for new materials to connect to painting and a progressive departure from the use of paintbrush.

=== The "serotipie" ===
Around the middle of the 1950s, the quality of silk screens improved and helped Nuvolo to achieve new results in terms of printing and graphic experimentation. In 1954, Arti Visive, innovative art journal (alternately directed by Ettore Colla and by poet and Biblicist Emilio Villa along with his brother Ascanio Ascani), displayed his first official works on its covers and within its pages.

The name "Serotipie" was coined by Emilio Villa, who found a new artistic meaning for the silk-screen abstract works, not intending them as reproduction series but unique printing works, made by an industrial tool and elaborated by acrylic and other materials. Interested on the role of causality in arts, similar to Jackson Pollock's dripping, and focusing on various fields like physic, astronomy and mathematics, Nuvolo gave a new status to silk-screen tool and its artistic potential.

=== Silk-screen paintings and collages ===
In 1956, Nuvolo married Liana Baracchi and together they organized an atelier for graphic arts which flourished for more than fifty years, first in Rome and then moving to his native Città di Castello in the early 1980s.

Silk-screen printing became the starting point for a vast array of artistic applications extending into many different fields over the years such as weaving, graphic arts, digital graphics and video art, considered by the author as a private field of research and expression, more than as elements for the marketing of art.

As the critic Bruno Corà wrote, "the Mondrian and Burri lesson found Nuvolo as exponent of principles so able to create an additional zone of poetic sensibility between the Cartesian rigor of the Dutch and the epic and dramatic nature of the Italian".

=== Sewing-machine production ===
Applying a small motor to a simple Vigorelli sewing machine, Nuvolo started a new cycle of spatial construction in the early 1960s. Textiles and fabrics led to unexpected geometric solutions “mixing – as the critic Gillo Dorfles wrote – the precedent experiences of Patchwork and Ready Made” in the series "Tensioni" (Tensions), "Diagrammi" (Diagrams) and "Daini" (Deers).

=== New frontiers in serigraphy ===
In the decade from 1967 to 1977, the formal conjunctions of the "Oigrog" series (with the anagrammatic title of the artist's name "Giorgio"), established a new serigraphic series based on the principles of fluid mechanics. The author used nitro colors giving life to psychedelic figures "simultaneously archetypical and android, as a last dynasty of golems produced by arts". The "Modulari" of 1969/1971 defined a new dynamic progression in symmetrical secularity of photographs created with silk screen.

=== Digital production ===
A new formal concept based on vector mathematics was introduced to Nuvolo by the developing of Informatics in the early 1980s, supported by his sons Giorgio, photographer; and Paolo, computer technician.

In "Alpha 39" (1987/89) series he used binary code, forging a scientific approach which led to the "Aftermandelbrot" series (1989/1992), following the fractal theories of Benoît Mandelbrot forcing it through a combination of "guided errors", deviations to the formula by computer, which created a proliferation of images by colors related to numerical values.

This computer-graphics production led to the work created in the 1990s with the cycles of "Circuiti" (Circuits), "Dittici e Trittici" (Diptychs and Triptychs), "Enantiomorfi" (Enantiomorphs), "Omogeni", until the last "Turbolenze" (Turbulences) of 1998 and "Legni Collage" (Wood collage) of 2002. The various applications of the "Genesi" (Genesis) cycle, started around 1994, which combined a particular manual intervention and a deeply pondered dialogue with video and sound based on the symphonies of Bach.

== Main exhibitions and collaborations ==
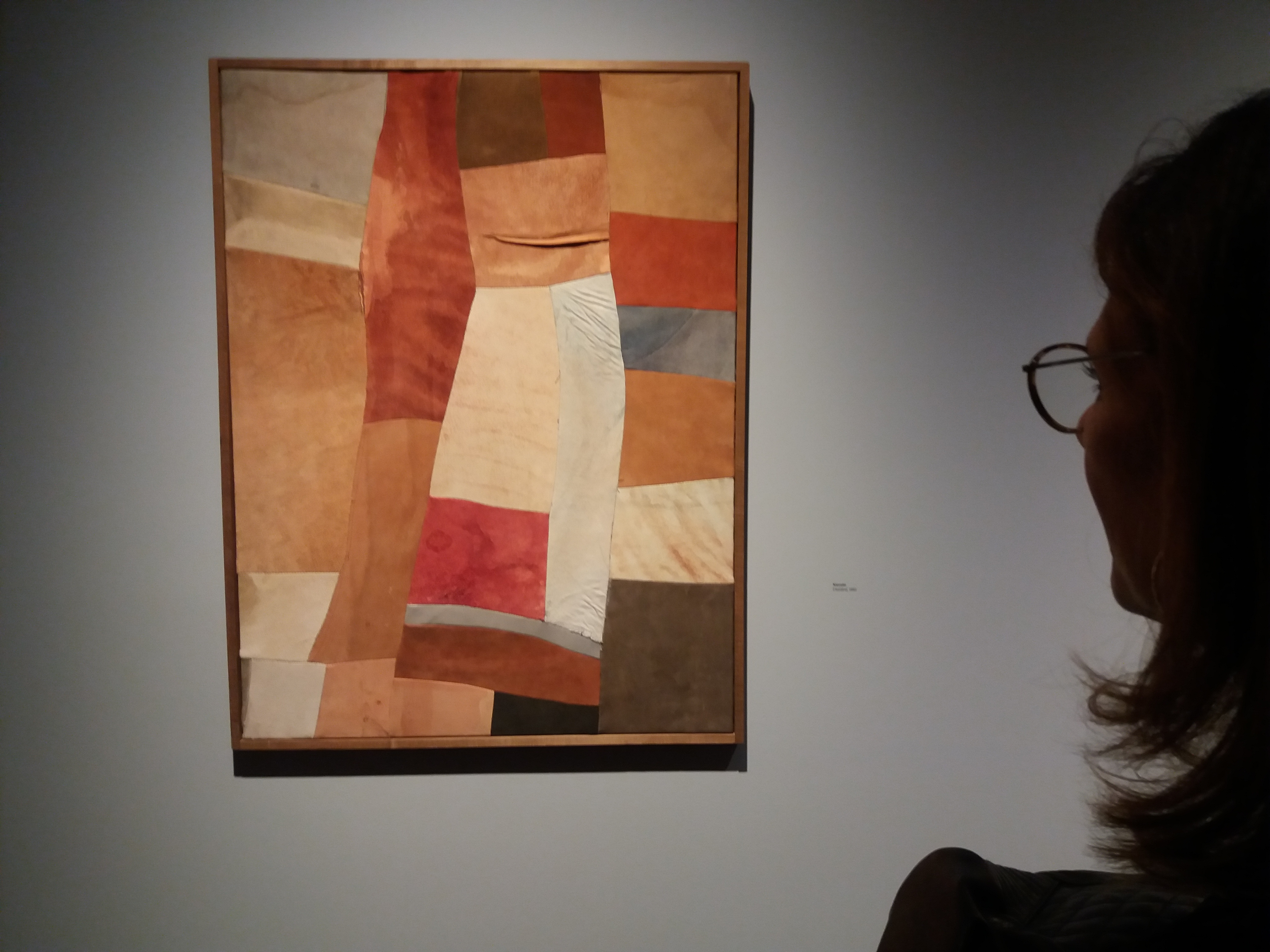

The first personal exhibition by Nuvolo was held in 1955 at the Rome gallery "Le Carrozze", presented by the poet Emilio Villa. In the same year, Corrado Cagli organized the second show in Florence, as the painter began to participate in various collective exhibitions with the coeval innovators of Informal paintings like Cagli himself, Burri, Giuseppe Capogrossi, Giulio Turcato, Mirko, Edgardo Mannucci, Carla Accardi, Achille Perilli and Piero Dorazio.

He participated in important festivals, including the Rome Quadriennale and the Premio Lissone, which led him to the attention of Lucio Fontana and the innovators in Milan, as well as beginning a lifetime collaboration with Ettore Colla.

Nuvolo's innovative activity was also encouraged by Peggy Guggenheim, who bought some of his works at La Tartaruga Gallery in Rome, for both her U.S. and Italian collections. Around 1967, he started a long and important collaboration in the field of graphic arts with many contemporary artists, including Corrado Cagli, Renato Guttuso, Jannis Kounellis, Michelangelo Pistoletto and Alberto Burri, who came back to work with him after many years for the chromatic cycle "Sestante" in the mid-1980s.

In 2002, he returned to produce the "esoedizioni" with various authors and critics exposing the works at the 18th-century typography "Grifani Donati" in his hometown, alongside the collaborator Marco Baldicchi.

To celebrate fifty years of his activity, Perugia and his hometown, Città di Castello, hosted an articulated exhibition encompassing a complete monographic study of his art by the critic Bruno Corà, "Nuvolo, the painting space between order and chaos".

In 2017, Di Donna Galleries in New York announced "Nuvolo and Post-War Materiality 1950–1965", an exhibition curated by Germano Celant focusing Nuvolo's role in "radically redefining traditional notions of painting and sculpture by exploiting the physical properties of raw materials using unmediated processes" in the "cuciti a macchina", "daini", and "diagrammi" series, contextualized by works by European and American artists as Burri, Lucio Fontana, Piero Manzoni, Antoni Tàpies, Cy Twombly, Ettore Colla, Pietro Consagra, Jean Fautrier, Addie Herder, Conrad Marca-Relli, Manolo Millares, Mimmo Rotella, Angelo Savelli, Salvatore Scarpitta, Toti Scialoja.

== Teaching ==
In 1977, after some years of teaching in the schools of arts in and outside Rome, he won the Chair of Painting Arts at the Academy of Fine Arts of Perugia, where he became director from 1979 to 1984. Under his guidance, the athenaeum reached a new way in teaching and promoting arts so that many important contemporary artists were invited to and actively collaborated with the institution.

== The Nuvolo Archive ==
When the artist died in his hometown in December 2008, Nuvolo was already entered in the small circle of contemporary-arts innovators and today his works are found in the collections of some of the major museums of Italy, France, Israel and United States.

In 2015, the family of the artist founded the "Nuvolo Archive" and donated some of his main works to the Pinacoteca Comunale, Città di Castello, which now sit amongst the rich historic and artistic heritage of the city.

== Selected bibliography (Italian) ==
- E. Villa, Nuvolo, in “Arti Visive” n° 2, Città di Castello, novembre 1954
- F. Bellonzi, C. Cagli, E. Colla, B. Corà, E. Crispolti, N. Ponente, C. Vivaldi, catalogo della mostra "Nuvolo-Nuntius Celatus", Delta Editori, 1971
- E. Villa, Exercitations de tire en io/cibles-formules pour les ingenu eux rayons des foetiches engeridrés par Nuvolo, Ed. La Palma, 1971
- G. Dorfles, Ultime tendenze nell’arte oggi, Feltrinelli, 1973
- N. Micheli, Nuvolo in Nel mondo del segno e del colore. Ed. Accademia, 1976
- G. Serafini, Una generazione: Araf - Bruscoli - Nuvolo, catalogo della mostra, Città di Castello/ Fidenza, 1982
- B. Corà, Nuvolo: la pittura e l'atelier di grafica dal 1952 ad oggi, Petruzzi, 1992
- V. Nocchi, Sulla pensabilità dell’origine. Riflessione in margine a “Genesi” e cinque invenzioni di Nuvolo, I libri di AEIUO, 2003
- A. Iori, Sei lettere e cinque invenzioni di Nuvolo, I libri di AEIUO, 2003
- A. Tagliaferri, Il Clandestino, vita e opere di Emilio Villa, DeriveApprodi, 2004
- M. Baldicchi, Io alle mie comodità non ci rinuncio! Omaggio a Emilio Villa, dedicato a Nuvolo, Petruzzi, 2004
- B. Corà, Nuvolo, lo spazio pittorico tra caos e ordine, Petruzzi, 2005
- E. Villa, Attributi dell’arte odierna 1947/1967 (curated by A. Tagliaferri), Le Lettere, 2008
- G. Celant, Nuvolo and Post-War Materiality 1950-1965 (Italian and English), Skira, 2017
