= Cristofano Gherardi =

Italian painter

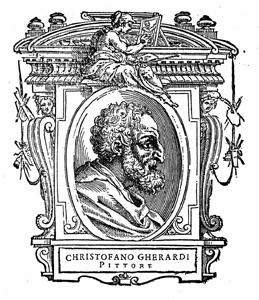
Cristofano Gherardi, 1555.

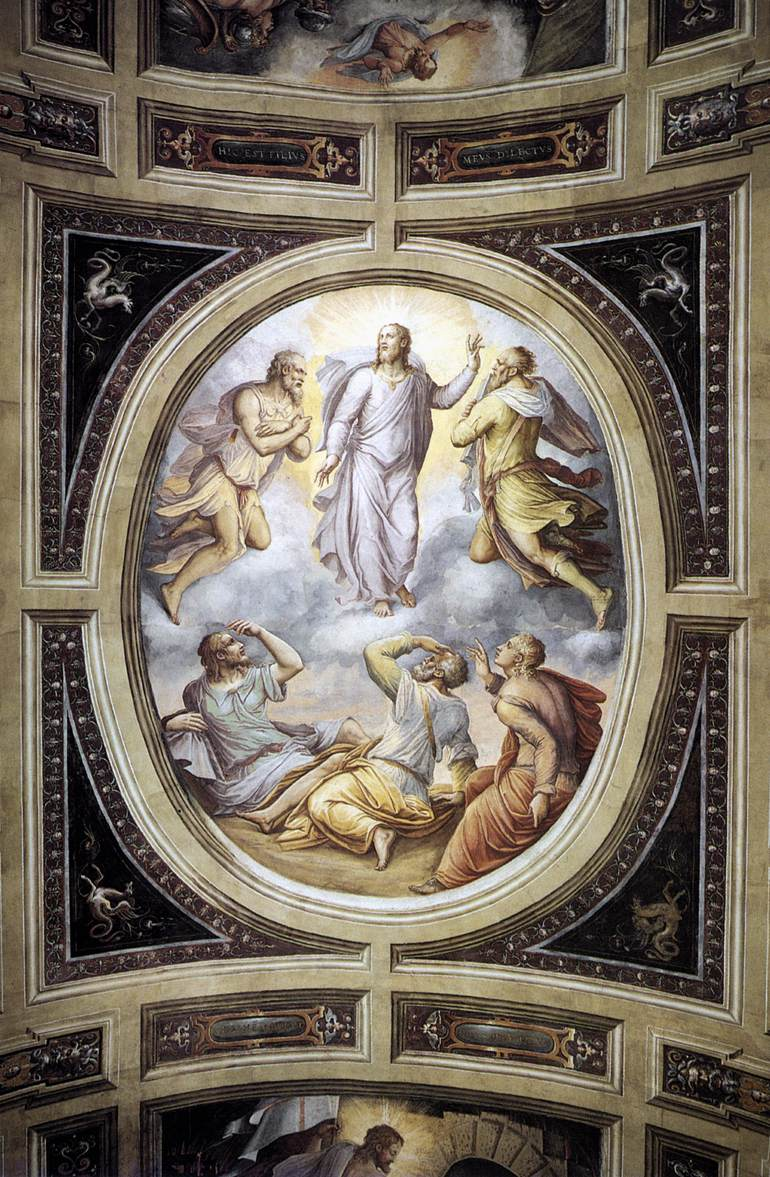
Transfiguration, 1555, Diocesan Museum, Cortona

Cristofano or Cristoforo Gherardi, also known as il Doceno, (November 25, 1508 – April 1556) was an Italian painter of the late-Renaissance or Mannerist period, active mainly in Florence and Tuscany.

== Biography ==
He was born in Borgo San Sepolcro and also called il Doceno dal Borgo. He was the pupil of the painter Raffaellino del Colle, in whose shop he encountered Rosso Fiorentino and Giorgio Vasari. He painted under Vasari's direction, the one assistant of Vasari's whom Freedberg singles out.

In 1536 Vasari invited him to Florence to assist in producing the decorations for the ceremonial entry of Charles V into Florence. The following year, in the reaction after Duke Alessandro's death, Gherardi was among those banished from Florence, so his work for Vasari was confined to projects outside Florence, until his banishment was lifted in 1554 and he was permitted to return. In the long interval he had painted the Visitation of Mary to Elizabeth for the church of San Domenico, Città di Castello; church decorations in San Sepolcro; and works for the Vitelli, who were long-term patrons. Gherardi, in the two years left to him, assisted Vasari in the Quartiere degli Elementi in Palazzo Vecchio. Vasari's main assistant after Gherardi's demise was Jan van der Straat, called Giovanni Stradano.

== Selected works ==
- Hall of Ceres, Palazzo Vecchio in Florence
- Allegory of Human Redemption, Villa Albani, Rome
- Visit of Mary to Elizabeth (1541–1545) Museum of Augustins de Toulouse
- Helen surrenders to Paris
- Assumption of the Virgin
- Laborers in a landscape: Allegory of November
- Holy family with St. John the Baptist & St. Anne
- Holy family with St. Anne and St. Jean
- Allegory of October
- Old testament sacrifices, Cortona
