= Margaret of Castello =

Italian Roman Catholic nun (1287–1320)

Saint Margaret of Castello TOSD
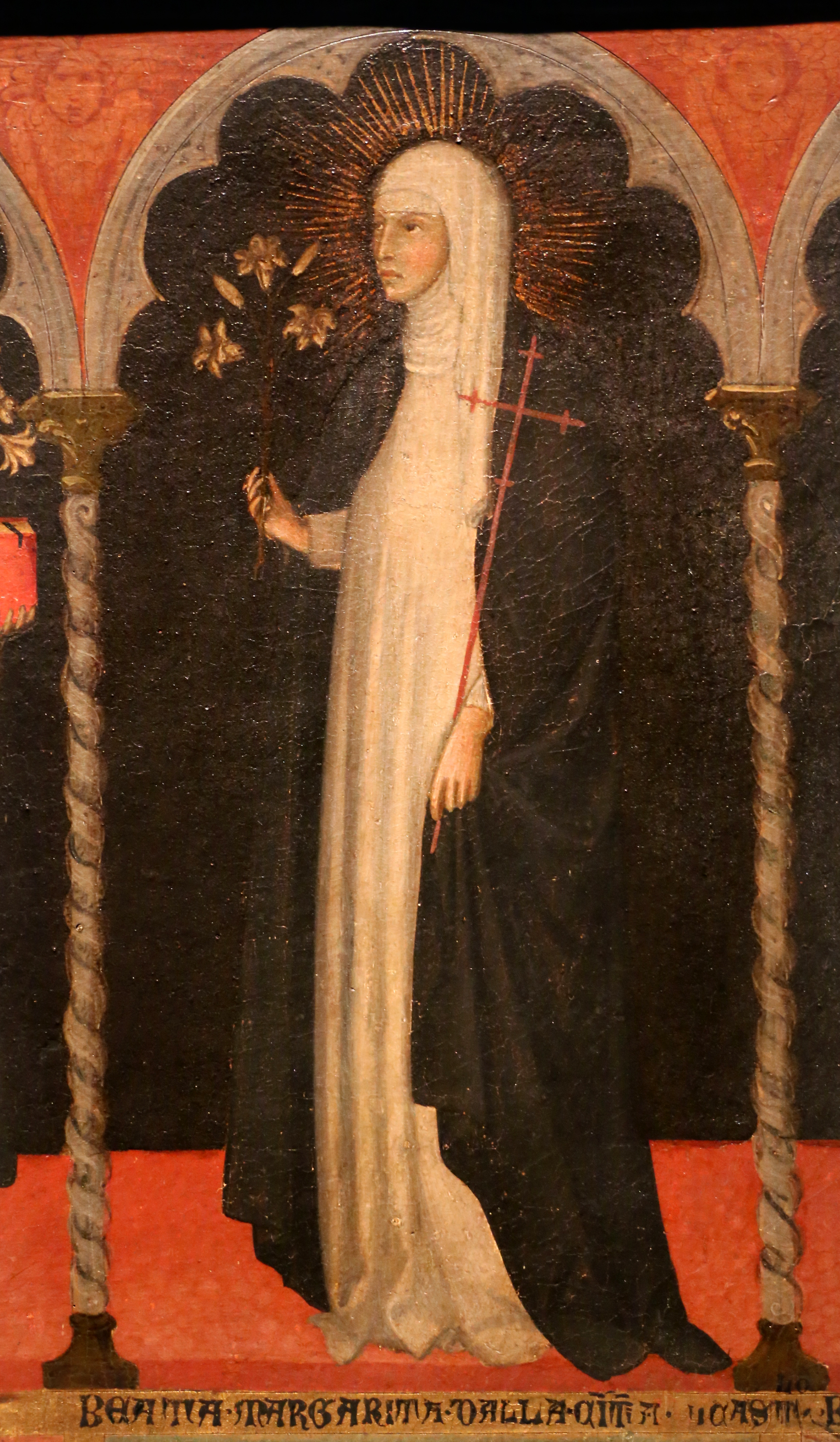
- Margaret of Castello by Andrea di Bartolo, c. 1394–98

Virgin
- Born: 1287; Castello della Metola, Papal States
- Died: 13 April 1320 (aged 32–33); Città di Castello, Papal States
- Venerated in: Roman Catholic Church
- Beatified: 19 October 1609, Saint Peter's Basilica, Papal States by Pope Paul V
- Canonized: 24 April 2021, Apostolic Palace, Vatican City by Pope Francis
- Major shrine: Chiesa di San Domenico, Città di Castello, Perugia, Italy
- Feast: 13 April
- Attributes: a lily and a heart
- Patronage: Disabled people; Blind people

Margaret of Città di Castello, TOSD (1287 – 12 April 1320) was an Italian Catholic educator and a Dominican tertiary. Margaret was both blind and had other physical disabilities and became known for her deep faith and holiness.

Her parents abandoned her in a local church due to her disabilities, and the town's poor took her in and assumed care for her. Nuns later offered her a home at their convent but soon came to detest her presence and cast her out, prompting the town's poor to once again take her in and care for her. She later met with Dominican friars and was accepted as a Dominican tertiary. She started a school for children to teach them in the faith and often took care of children while their parents were out at work.

Margaret's holiness was apparent to all in her life, so people lobbied for her to be buried in the local church, which was an honour reserved for a select few. Her beatification received approval from Pope Paul V on 19 October 1609. Pope Francis later declared her a saint through equipollent canonization on 24 April 2021.

== Life ==
Margaret of Castello was born in Perugia in 1287 to the nobles Parisio and Emilia in the Metola Castle near Mercatello sul Metauro. Her father served at the garrison at the castle.

Margaret was born blind with a severe curvature of the spine and had difficulties walking; she was also growth-restricted. Though her parents were embarrassed and hid her from all, a kind maid found her and gave her the name Margaret (derived from the Greek word "margaron", meaning "pearl"). When she was almost publicly discovered at age six, her parents walled her for about a decade in a room attached to their residence's chapel, to ensure no one would see her, although she could attend Mass and receive the sacraments. Her parents’ chaplain instructed her in the faith.

But soon there was an imminent threat of invasion at the castle, so Parisio ordered his wife to place a dark veil upon their daughter so the two could flee to his other castle at Mercatello. There, she was again imprisoned in a vault-like cubicle containing nothing more than an old, small bench. There were some who knew of Margaret and were furious at her treatment, though they never dared broach the subject with the sometimes temper-prone Parisio. Her mother soon suggested taking her to a church where miracles were said to occur. Emilia was timid in asking her husband, but was surprised to see that he showed a keen interest.

In 1303, her parents took her one morning to a shrine in the Franciscan church in Castello - where miracles were said to have happened, in the hope of a cure for Margaret's birth defects. When no such miracle happened, her parents abandoned her there. But she never came to resent or be bitter over her parents' decision. Some women at the church noticed her there. The town's poor took her in as one of their own, and she was passed to several poor families who helped prisoners and other poor people. Margaret was soon granted safe haven in a local convent. Their lax manner of life, though, soon conflicted with Margaret's intense faith, and she was expelled from the convent since her fervour was a tacit reproach to the nuns who came to detest her presence. It was after this that she took up residence in the town where the townsfolk resumed caring for her. To thank them for their kindness, she opened a small school for the children of the town where she instructed them in the faith and the psalms, which she had learnt during her time with the nuns. Margaret also looked after the town's children when their parents went to work.

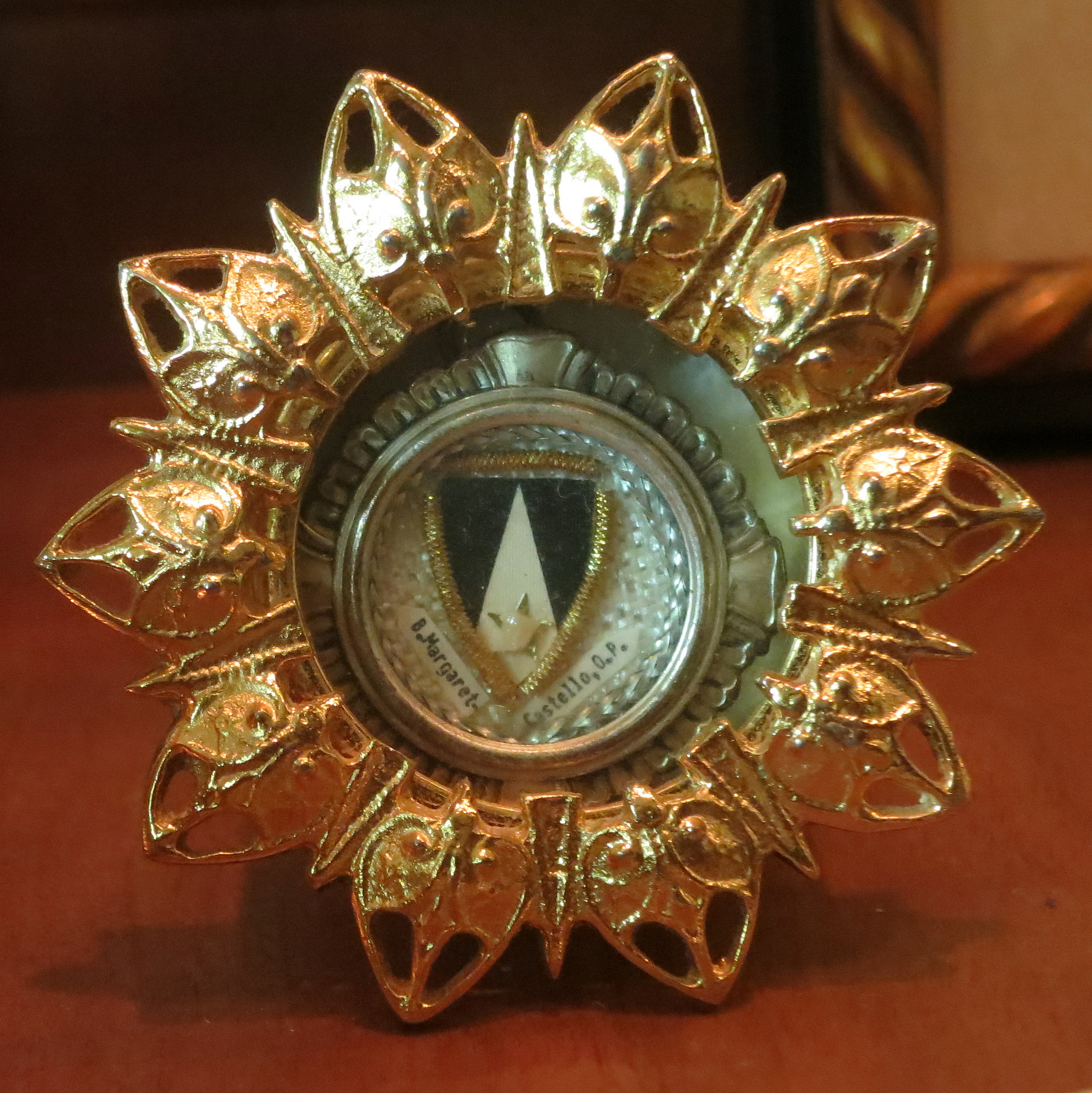
Relic at Saint Patrick's Church in Columbus, Ohio - a parish which houses a shrine to her.

In 1303, she came to know the Dominican friars who had become established in the town not long before. Margaret came under their spiritual guidance and was admitted to the local chapter of the Third Order of Saint Dominic; she received the religious habit of the order.

Margaret died on 12 April 1320, and the crowds at her funeral demanded that she be buried inside the church against the resistance of the parish priest. But after a disabled girl was cured at the funeral, he allowed for Margaret's burial inside.

== Veneration ==
Margaret's remains were transferred on 9 June 1558 because her coffin was rotten. Her clothes were also rotten, but her remains were incorrupt. The local bishop ordered a new casket to be made to house her remains, though he decided to inspect her remains for the beatification cause, which had been started. Margaret measured four feet long, and her head was rather large in proportion to her thin figure. Her forehead was broad with a face tapering to the chin with a quite prominent nose. Her teeth were small and even and were serrated at the edges. Her hands and feet were small, with her right leg an inch and a half shorter than the left (the cause of her limp).

Her longstanding veneration allowed Pope Paul V to confer equivalent beatification for her on 19 October 1609. Pope Clement X extended the privilege of a Mass and Divine Office in her name to the entire Dominican order on 6 April 1675 rather than for the Perugian branch as Paul V had done at her beatification. In 1988, the Urbino archbishop, Ugo Donato Bianchi, named her as a patron for the blind. Pope Francis declared her a saint through equipollent canonisation on 24 April 2021.

=== Dedications ===
There are two Dominican parishes in the United States that have shrines to Saint Margaret of Castello: St. Louis Bertrand Church in Louisville, Kentucky, and St. Patrick Church in Columbus, Ohio.
