= San Domenico, Città di Castello =

Church of St. Dominic
- Chiesa di San Domenico
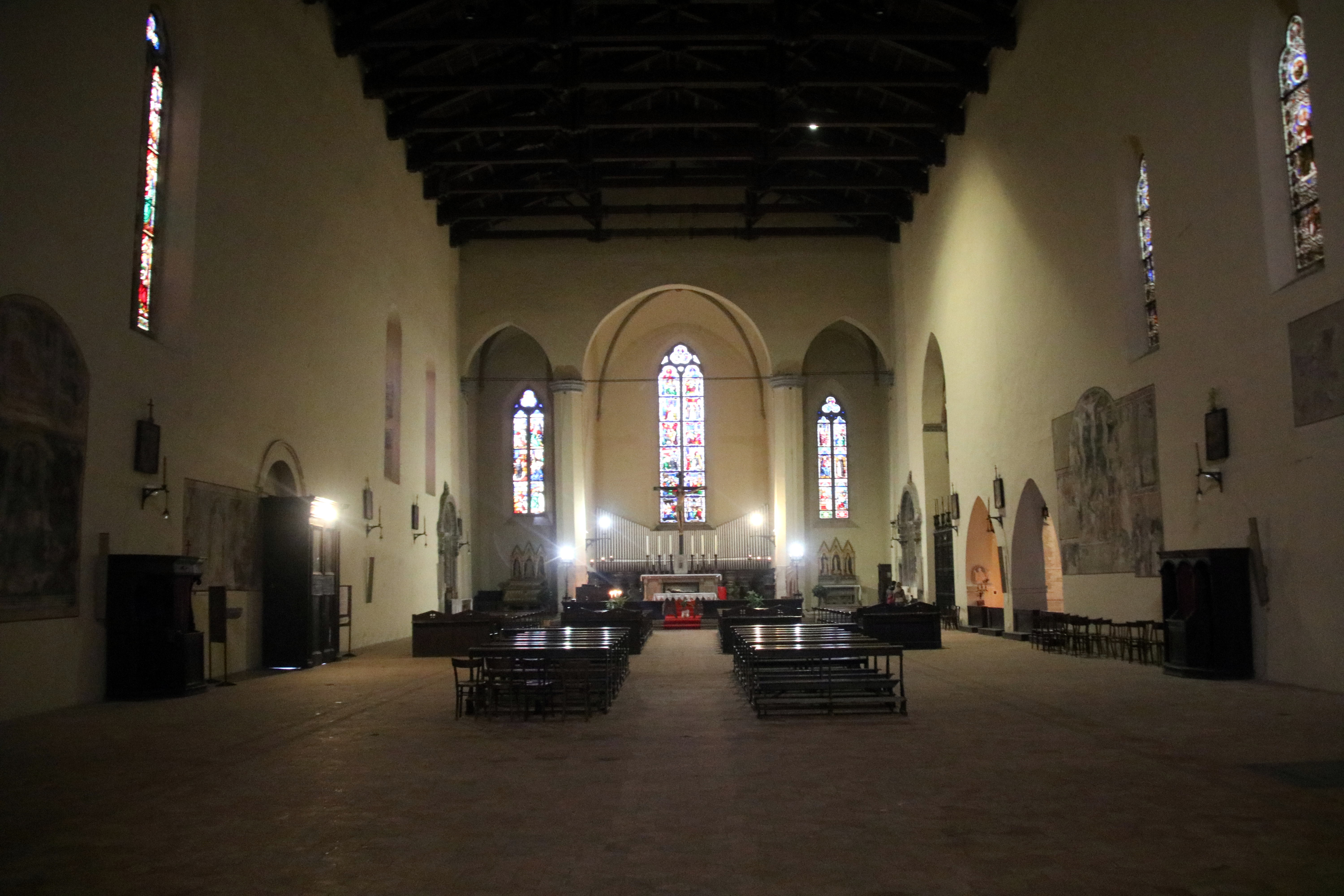
- Internal
- Church of St. Dominic
- 43°27′20″N 12°14′24″E
- Country: Italy
- Denomination: Catholic Church

San Domenico is a Renaissance and Gothic style, consecrated Roman Catholic church and former monastery. It is located on the corner of Largo Monsignor Muzi and Via Luca Signorelli, and adjacent to the Piazza di San Giovanni in Campo, in the center of Città di Castello, region of Umbria, Italy.

== History ==
The Dominican order was introduced in the city in 1269, and was affiliated with a number of different churches. Construction of this austere brick church began in 1400 and was completed in 1424. The façade is unfinished. On the left are the square bell tower and the ogival portal dating to the 14th century. In 1724, the interior was refurbished, removing nine lateral altars.

The church contains mostly fragmentary and restored frescoes inside; in 1911 many of the Baroque additions to the structure were removed. On the left wall, next to the side door, is a depiction of Saint Anthony (1426), facing the wall opposite a Crucifixion, both attributed to Antonio Alberti.

On the left side of the nave are three chapels with pointed arch entrances, one of which is dedicated to the Fallen in War and retains a 14th-century fresco depicting the Crucifixion with the Virgin and St John.

At the end of the aisle, the two altars once displayed respectively two Renaissance masterpieces, a Crucifixion (1503) by Raphael for the family Gavari,; the other, a Martyrdom of Saint Sebastian (1498) by Luca Signorelli, for the family Brozzi and now in the Pinacoteca Comunale of the town.

The main altar of the church contains the tomb of Saint Margaret (1287-1320), Dominican tertiary, called the Blind of Metola, from the place where she was born. The presbytery houses a precious wooden choir, called the Coro Manno, carved and inlaid in 1435 by the Florentine Manno Benincasa. Other painters include Santi di Tito and Francesco da Castello.

The adjacent convent still maintains its 17th-century cloister, recently acquired by the City of Città di Castello. The lunettes of the inner arches were frescoed between 1662 and 1667, depicting the Life of the Blessed Margherita. Some of them were painted by Giovanni Battista Pacetti other by Salvi, a pupil of Pietro da Cortona.
