= Alessandro Albini =

Italian painter

Alessandro Albini (1568–1646) was an Italian painter of the early Baroque period. He was born in Bologna, and was an early pupil of the school of the Carracci. He was known for designs he made for the funeral ceremony of Agostino Carracci. He painted a Tomb of St. Valerian and St.Tibertius for the church of San Michele in Bosco in Bologna, and paintings of St. Peter, St. Catherine, St. Agnes, and St. Cecilia for San Pietro Martyr.
