= Evangelista da Pian di Meleto =

Italian painter

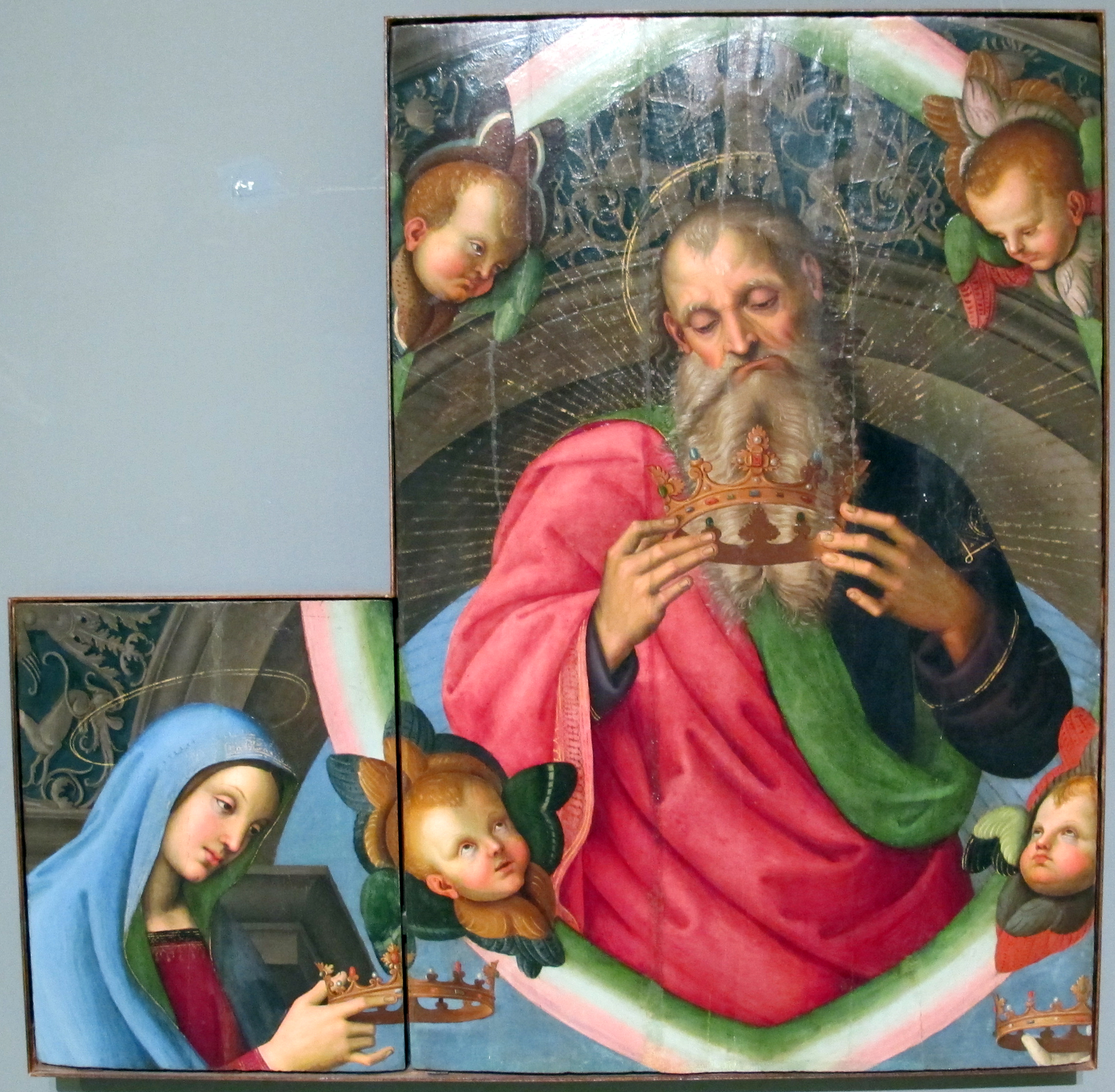
Eterno e la Vergine, 1501

Evangelista da Pian di Meleto (circa 1460 – 1549) was an Italian painter of the Renaissance period.

He was born in Piandimeleto in Umbria. In 1488, he was working along with Giovanni Santi, the father of Raphael, in Piandimeleto. Along with Raphael, he painted the altarpiece of San Nicola da Tolentino for the church of Sant'Agostino in Città di Castello. It was commissioned in 1500 and finished in 1501; now only some cut sections and a preparatory drawing remain. Some of the unsigned works of Giovanni Santi may be in fact by Evangelista.
