= Mercatello sul Metauro =

Mercatello sul Metauro Mercatèl
- Comune
- Comune di Mercatello sul Metauro
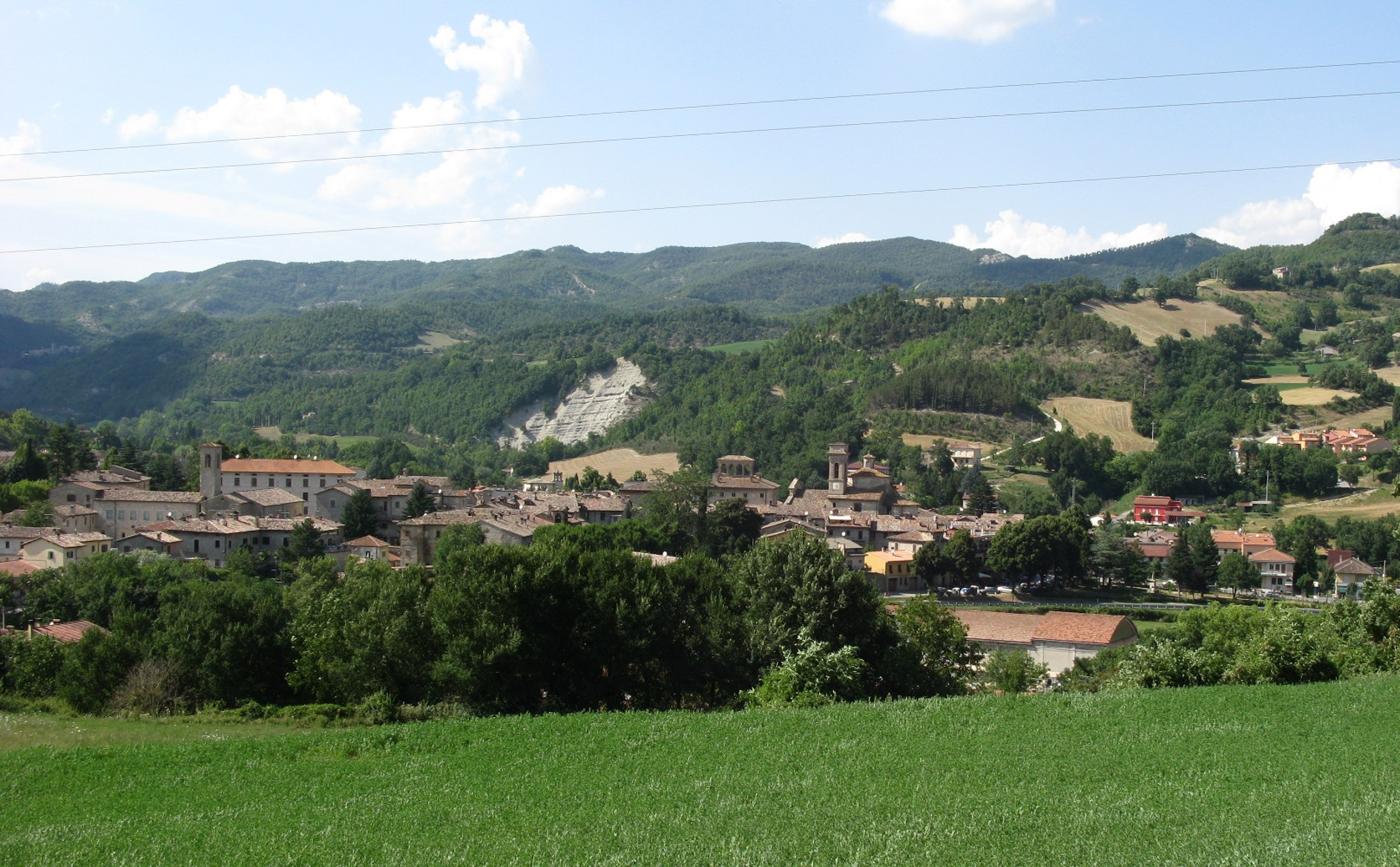
- View of Mercatello sul Metauro

- Coat of arms

- Location within Italy Location within Marche
- Coordinates: 43°39′N 12°20′E
- Country: Italy
- Region: Marche
- Province: Pesaro e Urbino (PU)
- Frazioni: Castello della Pieve

Government
  - Mayor: Fernanda Sacchi

Area
  - Total: 68.36 km^{2} (26.39 sq mi)
- Elevation: 429 m (1,407 ft)

Population (31 October 2020)
  - Total: 1,320
  - Density: 19.3/km^{2} (50.0/sq mi)
- Demonym: Mercatellesi
- Time zone: UTC+1 (CET)
  - Summer (DST): UTC+2 (CEST)
- Postal code: 61040
- Dialing code: 0722
- Patron saint: St. Veronica
- Saint day: 9 July
- Website: Official website

Mercatello sul Metauro (Romagnol: Mercatèl) is a comune (municipality) in the Province of Pesaro e Urbino in the Italian region Marche, located about 100 kilometres (62 mi) west of Ancona and about 50 kilometres (31 mi) southwest of Pesaro.

It is one of I Borghi più belli d'Italia ("The most beautiful villages of Italy"). Economy is mostly based on agriculture and sheep husbandry.

Birth place of Margaret of Castello.

== History ==
Mercatello is known as a settlement of the Umbri in the 12th century BC. Later it was conquered by the ancient Romans; destroyed during the barbaric invasions, it was rebuilt by the Lombards in the 6th century as Pieve d'Ico. First under Città di Castello and Massa Trabaria (9th century), it was turned into an autonomous fortified commune in 1235 by Pope Gregory IX. In 1437 it was annexed to the Duchy of Urbino; in 1636 it became part of the Papal States.

== Main sights ==
- Pieve Collegiata (with walls from the original 10th century Romanesque edifice), rebuilt in 1363.
- Gothic church of St. Francis (13th century), with a notable collection of paintings from the 12th to 17th centuries (including a portrait of Federico III da Montefeltro attributed to Benedetto da Maiano or Francesco di Giorgio Martini).
- Ducal Palace (15th century), also attributed to Francesco di Giorgio Matrini
- Palazzaccio (16th century).
