= Antonio Rinaldeschi =

Italian executed for blasphemy (died 1501)

Antonio Rinaldeschi (died 1501) was an Italian gambler and blasphemer, who gained notoriety for throwing dung at a painting of the Virgin Mary above the doorway of the church of Santa Maria degli Alberghi in Florence. Rinaldeschi was later executed and a cult developed after a piece of dung that remained resembled a crown above the Virgin's head.

Rinaldeschi's act was portrayed by the painter Filippo Dolciati in his 1502 painting The Story of Antonio Rinaldeschi.
