= Pinacoteca Comunale, Città di Castello =

Art museum in Umbria, Italy

Coordinates: 43.4544°N 12.2386°E

Pinacoteca di Città di Castello
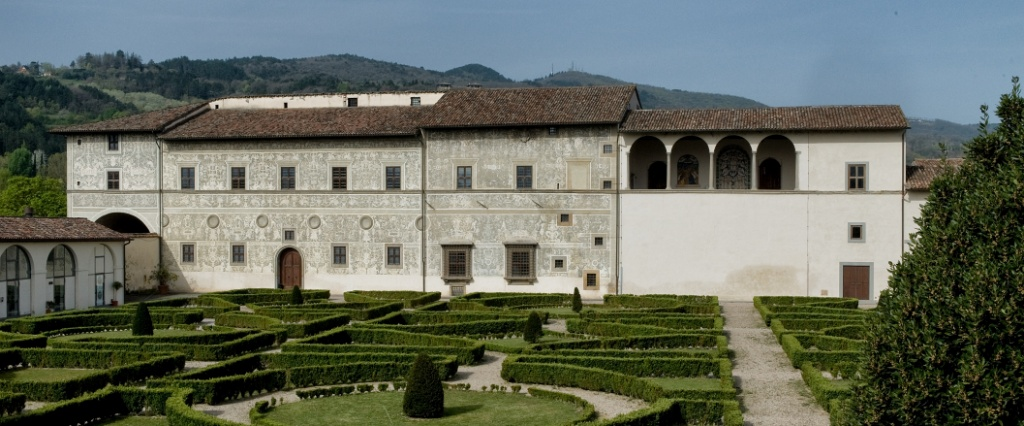
- View of Palazzo Vitelli alla Cannoniera
- Location: via della Cannoniera 22/A, Città di Castello
- Type: Art museum

The Pinacoteca Comunale of Città di Castello is the main museum of paintings and arts of Umbria Italian Region, alongside the Perugia's National gallery, and it's housed in a renaissance palace, generally preserved in its original form.

== History ==
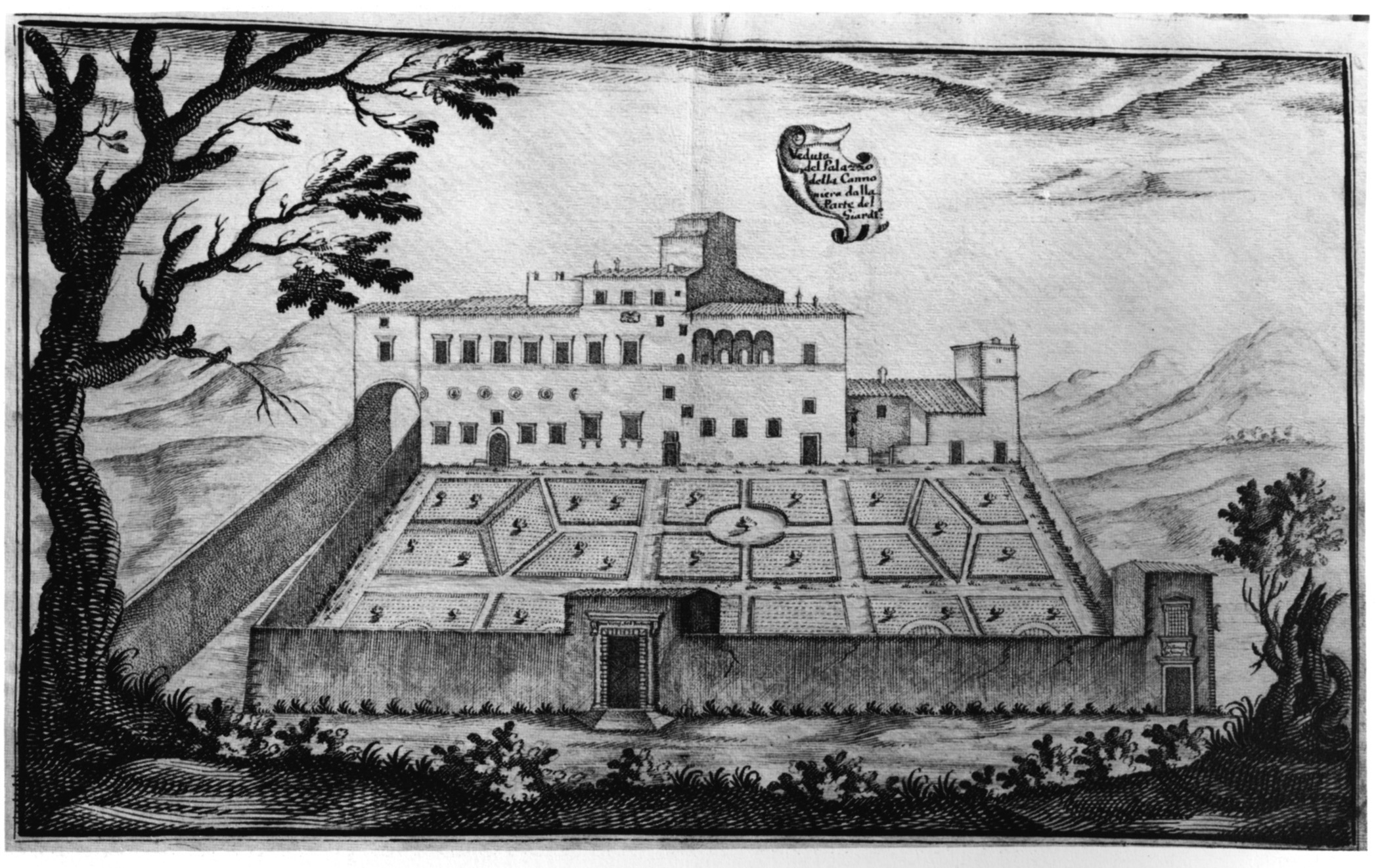
drawing of Alessandro Nave, 1699

The Città di Castello Municipal gallery is housed in the renaissance-style Vitelli alla Cannoniera Palace, home to the condottiere Alessandro Vitelli, grandson of Niccolò Vitelli, and wife Angela Paola de’ Rossi, nephew of Giovanni delle Bande Nere.

It is among the main public art galleries in Italy, and documents art from the 13th to 20th centuries, focusing on Renaissance art, and the very early works by Raphael and Luca Signorelli.

The collection is composed mainly by paintings derived from religious institutions suppressed in the 19th century after Italian unification, and also reflects the patronage of Vitelli family, prominent allies of Medici. Donations to the collection of later works, up to the 20th century, expanded the collections.

== Palazzo Vitelli alla Cannoniera ==
Construction of the palace occurred mainly between 1521 and 1532, and completed in 1545 for the marriage between Alessandro Vitelli and Paola de’ Rossi. The palace faces a garden, that in the 16th century was famous in Europe due to its collection of exotic plants.

In 1907, Elia Volpi, a local manager and artist who had previously worked on the restoration of the Palazzo Davanzati in Florence, acquired and restored this palace, donating it in 1912 for the city to house the Municipal Art Gallery.

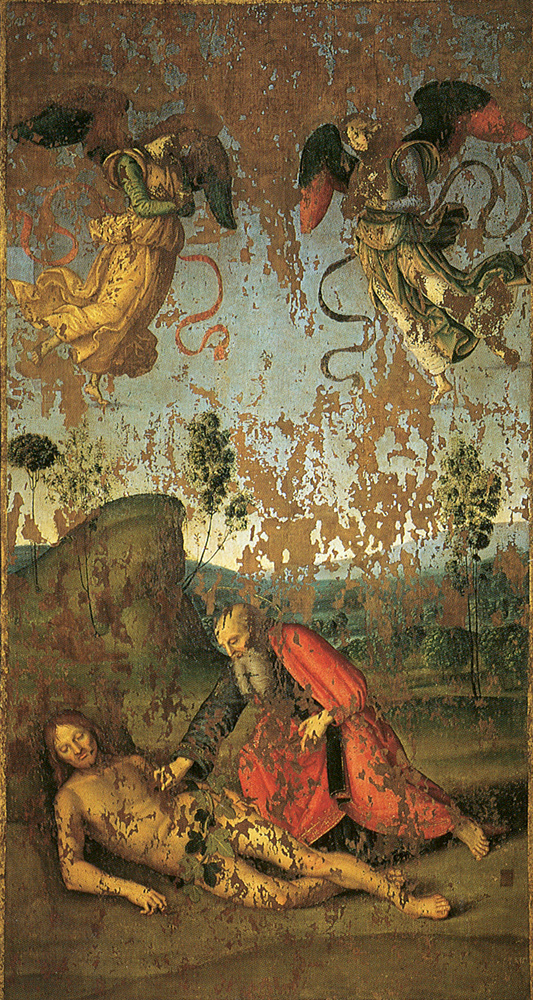
Banner of the Holiest Trinity (back, Creation of Eve) by Raphael

The main façade is decorated with graphic scenes painted by Cristoforo Gherardi to Giorgio Vasari’s design, with clear references to the names of the commissioners and their coats of arms, the palm of Vitelli and the roaring lion of Rossi, among rich decorative motifs of the 15th century as vases, masks and alchemic elements.

The rooms are also richly decorated by Gherardi and Cola Dell’Amatrice, called by the Vitelli to celebrate the resident couple and the military prowess of the family, with vivid mythological places and some elegant figurations of pets, symbol of the domestic ambient.

A monumental staircase which leads to the first floor with paintings depicting prince Apollo and all of the muses of arts, inspired by Ovid’s Metamorphoses.

== Painting Collection ==
The oldest works in the collection are 13th century gilded works such as the majestic panel with Enthroned Madonna and Child with Six Angels by the Master of Città di Castello, a follower of Duccio di Boninsegna.

The main collection includes Renaissance masterworks that highlight the connections of the Vitelli with Medici. The museum offers a number of Luca Signorelli works, from works that show the strong influence of Piero della Francesca, to his Martyrdom of St Sebastian, and a privileged view of the first activity of Raphael, who reached the status of "master" working in the city, as notable in the two facades of Standard of the Holiest Trinity, the only one work left in Città di Castello, which many critics consider his first work.

Other Florentine works include Domenico Ghirlandaio's Coronation of the Virgin and rich mannerism paintings by Raffaellino del Colle, Pomarancio and other coeval artists.

The 20th century section hosts creations by Giorgio de Chirico, Renato Guttuso, Mario Mafai, and Carlo Carrà. In 2015 the Museum included a permanent collection of Nuvolo’s works, friend and colleague to Alberto Burri and global innovator in silk screen art.

- Gothic art; Selected works (rooms I-II-III)
  - Enthroned Madonna and Child with six Angels by Master of Città di Castello
  - Enthroned Madonna and Child by Spinello Aretino
  - Enthroned Madonna and Child by Andrea di Bartolo
  - San Bartolomeo Triptic by Antonio Alberti
  - Enthroned Madonna and Child by Antonio Vivarini
- Local and Tuscan Renaissance; Selected works (rooms IV-V-VII)
  - Madonna and Child with two Angels by Neri di Bicci
  - Christ with the signs of the Passion by an unknown 15th Century painter
  - Coronation of the Virgin by Domenico Ghirlandaio and workshop
  - Annunciation and All Saint’s Altarpiece by Francesco Tifernate
- Renaissance/ Raphael in Città di Castello; Selected works (room VI)
  - Banner of the Holy Trinity, front The Trinity with Saints Sebastian and Roch, back Creation of Eve by Raphael
- Renaissance/ Luca Signorelli in Città di Castello; Selected works (rooms XII, XIII)
  - Saint Paul by Luca Signorelli
  - Martyrdom of St Sebastian by Signorelli
  - Banner of Saint John Baptist: front Saint John, back Christ Baptism
  - Santa Cecilia Altarpiece by Luca Signorelli and workshop
- Tuscan and Roman Mannerism; Selected works (rooms XVI-XVII-XVIII)
  - Annunciation by Raffaellino del Colle
  - Deposition and Madonna and Child with Saints by Jacopo di Giovanni Francesco
  - The laying of hands by Peter and John by Santi di Tito
  - Immaculate Conception by Nicolò Circignani, known as Pomarancio
- From Seventeenth to Nineteenth Century; Selected works (rooms VI-XIX-XX)
  - Two Saints by Giovanni Battista Pacetti
  - Saint Nicholas of Tolentino by Ermenegildo Costantini
  - Domine quo vadis? by Francesco Mancini
  - Madonna and Child, by Tommaso Conca
  - Madonna and Child by Vincenzo Chialli
- Twentieth Century; Selected works
  - Italy’s square by Giorgio de Chirico
  - Still life by Renato Guttuso
  - Seascape by Carlo Carrà
  - Group in restaurant by Mario Mafai
  - permanent collection by Nuvolo

== Sculpture and decorative arts ==
The sculpture section exhibits pieces from late Roman and middle age fragments to a notable group of terracotta by Andrea della Robbia and his workshop, which confirms the important Florentine influence on the area. The unique piece of Jewelry is the reliquary of Saint Andrew by Lorenzo Ghiberti and his workshop, one of the museum peaks.

The wooden furniture of the palace testify the great tradition of wood art in Città di Castello, starting from originals 16th century pieces. The passage to contemporary sculpture is given by Elmo Palazzi and Bruno Bartoccini stucco and bronze collections.

- Selected works:
  - Unknown 15th century?, Baptism of Christ
  - Lorenzo Ghiberti and workshop, Reliquary of Saint Andrew
  - Andrea della Robbia and workshop, Assumption of the Virgin
  - Elmo Palazzi, stucco collection
  - Bruno Bartoccini, bronze statues collection

== Events and expositions ==
Città di Castello Municipal gallery hosted many events like the national exhibition for the 500 anniversary of birth of Raphael in 1983, and the section of Luca Signorelli national event in 2012 focusing his activity in the city. The restoration of a wing of the palace permitted an opening to contemporary arts, with Nuvolo, Josef Albers, Andy Warhol exhibitions and a series of events linked to Alberto Burri Birth Centenary.

Many scientific activities were hosted as the important restoration of Raphael banner in 2005, for the London National Gallery exhibition about the early production of the artist.

== Between history and legend (Sora Laura) ==
Palazzo Vitelli alla Cannoniera has always been linked to the popular legend of Laura, or rather “Sora Laura”, who’s been said the lover of Alessandro Vitelli who preferred her to his wife. Bored for the frequent absence of the husband at war, she seemingly attracted good looking young men into her clutches by dropping a lace-edged handkerchief into the street and then killing them in a still existing, exit inside the building. In 2006, the artist Milo Manara paid his homage to this legendary woman.

== Selected bibliography in English ==
- Bernard Berenson, Italian Pictures of the Renaissance, Phaidon Press, 1963
- Hugo Chapman, Tom Henry, Carol Plazzotta, Arnold Nesselrath, Raphael: from Urbino to Rome, National Gallery London, 2004
- Francesco Maria Mancini, Tom Henry, Gli esordi di Raffaello tra Urbino, Città di Castello e Perugia, Edimond, 2006 (Italian/English)
- Isabella Consigli, Silvia Consigli, Palazzo Vitelli alla Cannoniera, Petruzzi, 2009 (Italian/English)
- Tom Henry, The Life and Art of Luca Signorelli, Yale, 2012
