= Monteripido Altarpiece =

Painting by Pietro Perugino

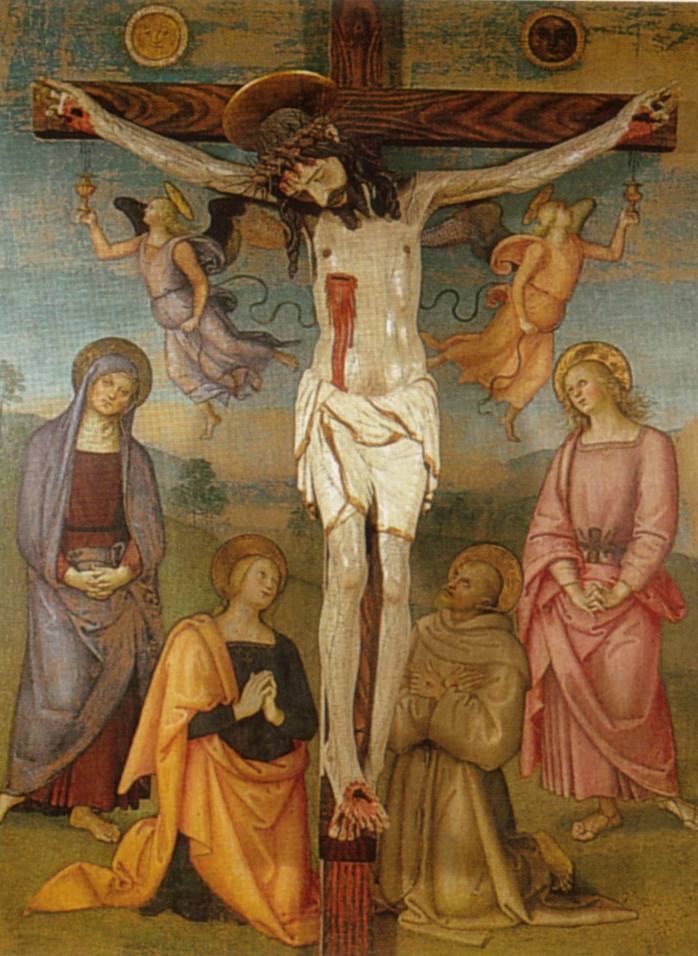
- Artist: Perugino
- Year: 1502
- Medium: oil on panel
- Dimensions: 240 cm × 180 cm (94 in × 71 in)
- Location: Galleria Nazionale dell'Umbria, Perugia

The Monteripido Altarpiece is a double-sided altarpiece by Perugino, completed in 1502 for San Francesco al Monte church in Monteripido near Perugia. It is now in the Galleria Nazionale dell'Umbria in Perugia.

== Recto ==
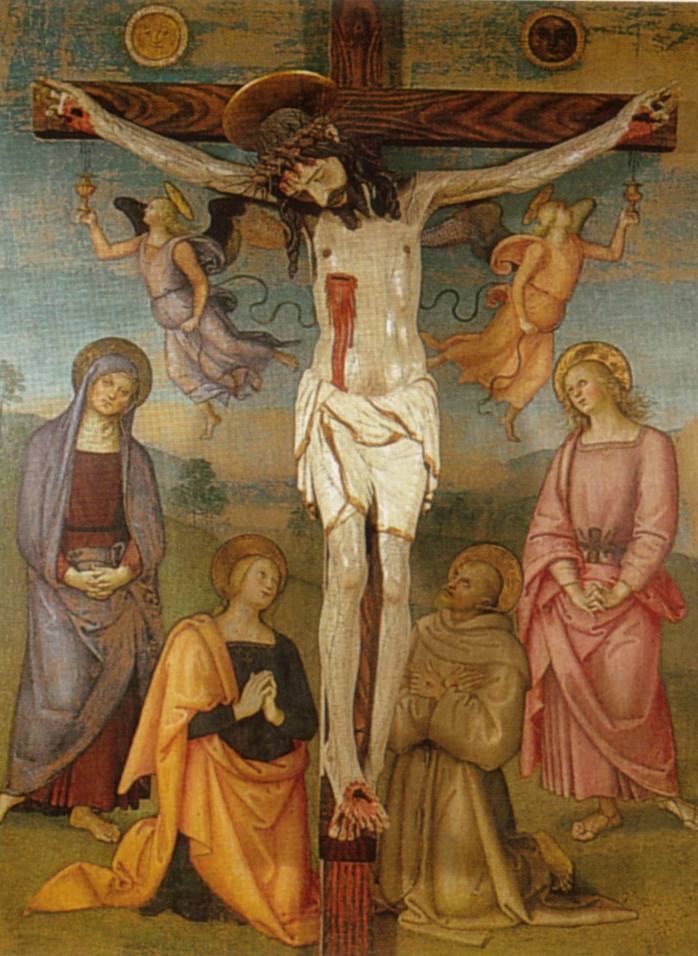
Recto

This side of the piece was produced as the background for an earlier wooden crucifix, which is still in situ. It shows figures surrounding the Crucifixion of Christ, with (from left to right) the Virgin Mary, Mary Magdalene, Francis of Assisi (there was a Franciscan monastery in Monteripido) and John the Apostle. It largely reuses pre-existing drawings and cartoons made by Perugino - the figures around the cross reuse those from his Florence Crucifixion (1494–1496), whilst the two angels catching Christ's blood in chalices are variants on those in Agony in the Garden (c. 1483–1495).

== Verso ==
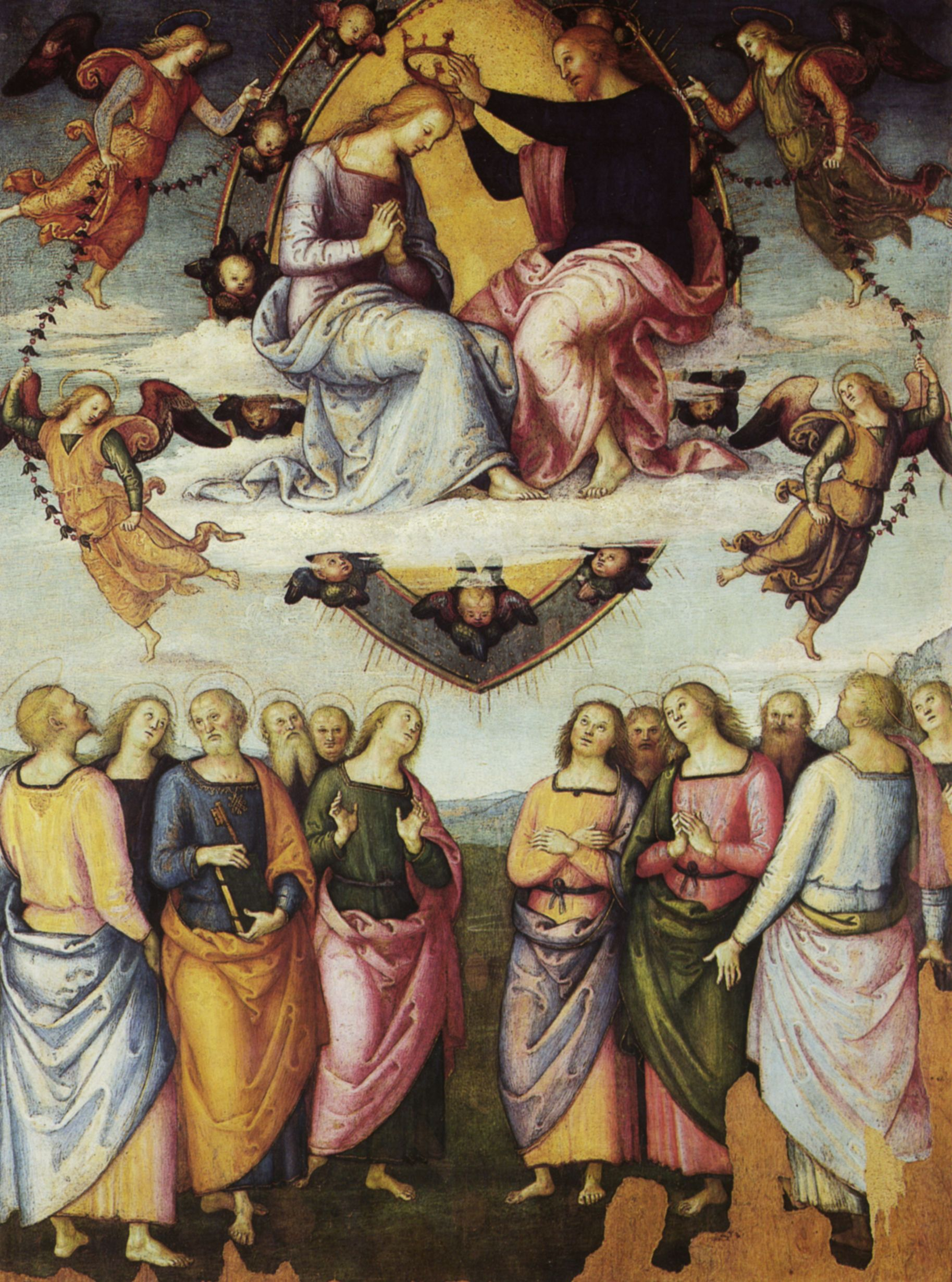
Verso

This shows the Coronation of the Virgin, again reusing several previous cartoons, drawings and compositions from his other paintings of the same subject, such as his lost frescoes in the Sistine Chapel (1481–82) and the group of apostles from the Annunziata Altarpiece (1504–1507) and the San Pietro Polyptych (c. 1496–1500). The angel with a garland, however, does not have a precedent in his earlier works.

== Bibliography (in Italian) ==
- Vittoria Garibaldi, Perugino, in Pittori del Rinascimento, Scala, Florence, 2004 ISBN 888117099X
- Pierluigi De Vecchi, Elda Cerchiari, I tempi dell'arte, volume 2, Bompiani, Milan, 1999 ISBN 88-451-7212-0
- Stefano Zuffi, Il Quattrocento, Electa, Milan, 2004 ISBN 8837023154
