= Wang Guxiang =

Chinese Landscape Artist during Ming dynasty

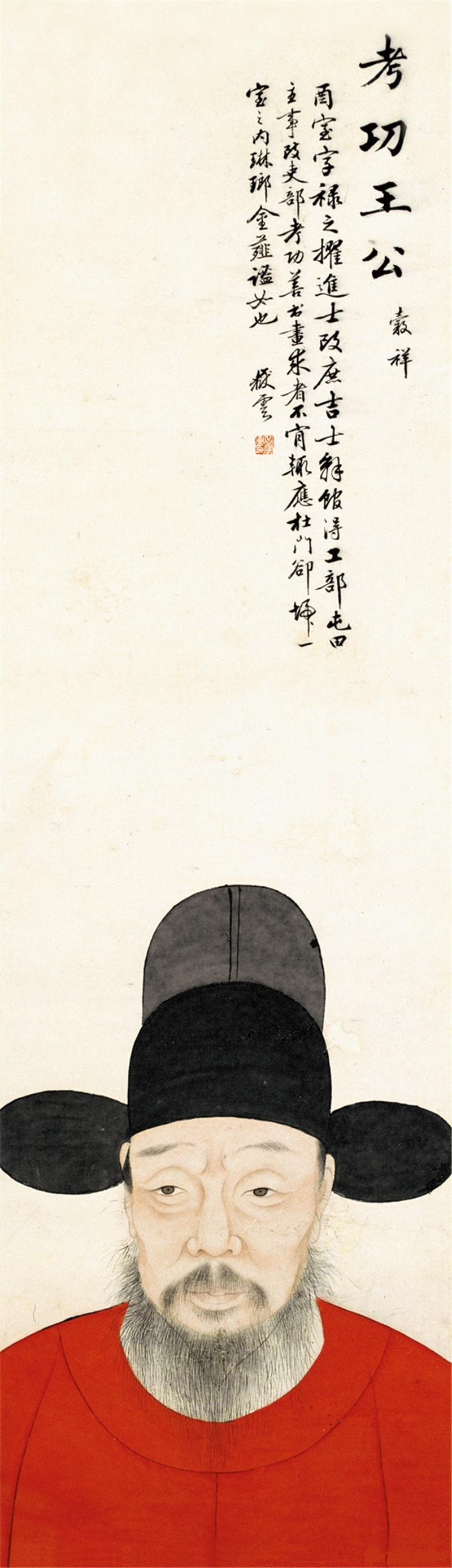
Wang Guxiang

Wang Guxiang (Wang Ku-hsiang, traditional: 王谷祥, simplified: 王谷祥); ca. 1501–1568 was a Chinese landscape painter during the Ming dynasty (1368–1644).

Wang was born in Changzhou in the Jiangsu province. His style name was 'Luzhi' and his sobriquet was 'Youshi'. Wang specialized in landscapes and bird-and-flower paintings.
