= Miniature altarpiece =

The name miniature altarpiece may refer to several different Gothic boxwood miniatures:

- Miniature altarpiece (V&A 225-1866), c.1500-1520, held at the Victoria and Albert Museum, London
- Miniature altarpiece (WB.232), 1511, held at the British Museum, London
- Miniature altarpiece (OA 5612), c.1520-1530, held at Louvre, Paris
- Miniature Altarpiece with the Crucifixion (MA 17.1690.453), early 16th-century, held at The Cloisters, New York
