= Prayer bead with the Prayer of the Rosary and the Lamentation =

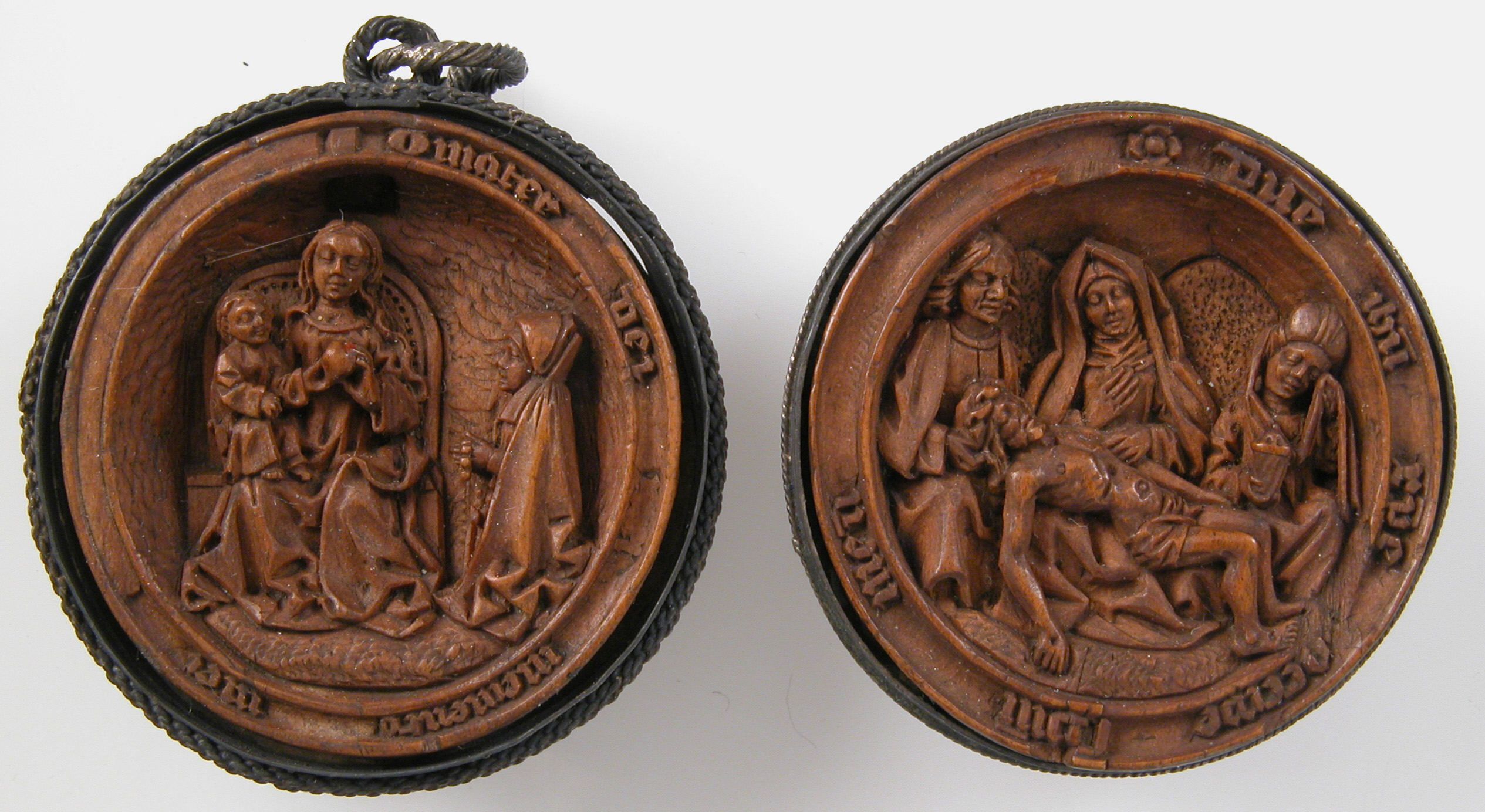
South Netherlandish, boxwood, diameter: 3 cm, early 16th century

Prayer bead with the Prayer of the Rosary and the Lamentation) (MS 17.190.458a, b) refers to a pair of Gothic boxwood miniature medallions originating from Flanders around the early 16th century, probably between 1490-1530. Made from boxwood and silver, they were originally the interiors of a prayer nut (a type of prayer bead).

One interior shows the Virgin and Child alongside a kneeling nun who holds a string of beads in her hand and is shown facing the saints. The inside border of the medallion is inscribed with the words "O mater dei memento mei" (O Mother of God, remember me). The second interior shows a somber Pietà, with Mary, Saint John and Mary Magdalene mourning the death of Jesus. It is lined with an inscription taken from Acts 7:59 which reads: d[omi]ne ih[s]u xr[ist]e accipe spi[rit]u[m] meu[m] (Lord Jesus Christ, receive my spirit [Acts 7:59]).

Unusually for objects of this type, which are characterised by their approach to Horror vacui (fear of empty space), very little of the available border surface is used for inscriptions, indeed the objects are not as detailed as most other extant boxwood prayer nuts, and have been described as "modest".

The beads were gifted to The Metropolitan Museum of Art, by J. Pierpont Morgan in 1917. They were formerly owned by M. Charles Mannheim (1833-1910) of Paris.

== Sources ==
- Boehm, Barbara Drake; Suda, Alexandra. "Handpicked: Collecting Boxwood Carvings from the Sixteenth to the Twenty-First Centuries." In: Scholten, Frits (ed), "Small Wonders: Late-Gothic Boxwood Micro-Carvings from the Low Countries". Amsterdam: Rijksmuseum, 2016.
- Ellis, Lisa; Suda, Alexandra. "Small Wonders: Gothic Boxwood Miniatures". Art Gallery of Ontario, 2016. ISBN 978-1-8942-4390-2
- Molinier, Émile. "Collection Charles Mannheim: Objets d'Art. Paris: Imp. de l'Art, 1898
- Wixom, William. "Medieval Sculpture at The Cloisters". The Metropolitan Museum of Art Bulletin, volume 46, no. 3, Winter, 1988–1989
