= Adam Dircksz =

16th-century Dutch sculptor

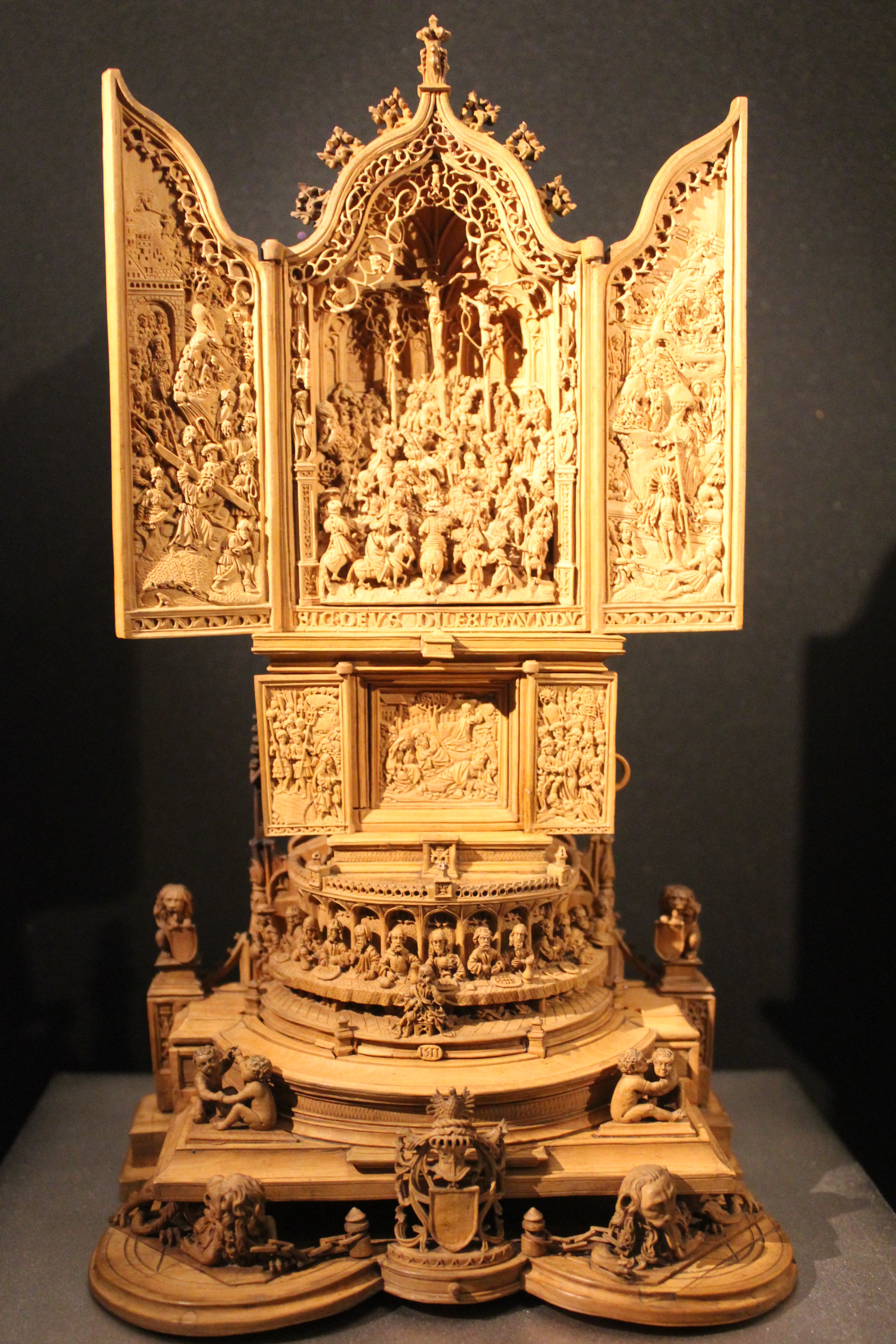
Portable altar (WB.232), dated 1511. 25.1 cm × 14 cm (9.9 in × 5.5 in). British Museum, London

Adam Dircksz (active 1500–1530) is the name ascribed by some art historians to a highly influential Dutch sculptor whose workshop is often attributed with the creation of around 60 of the c. 150 extant Gothic boxwood miniature micro-carvings. Other historians prefer to attribute various unrelated artists who are given individual or grouped notnames. It may be that the master was the innovator in this style of sculpture, and that similar works were directly inspired. According to the British Museum, Dircksz may have served "elite patrons in the circle of the Holy Roman Emperor Charles V, with a strong link to Delft."

Almost nothing is known about his life, except from some dates and signatures left on carvings, which indicate only that he was associated with the art works, the real life person may have been a woodcutter, sculptor, medallist, or a patron. Dircksz is thought to have been active between 1500 and 1530, and responsible for some sixty of the surviving examples. He may have led a workshop in the southern Netherlands, given that Flemish inscriptions appear on some of the carvings. Alternatively, it was located more northerly, possibly in the north of Brabant or at Delft in Holland. In any case, apart from Henry VIII and Catherine, all of the original owners come from the Netherlands.

== Attribution ==
The more complex boxwood miniatures may have taken decades of work to complete, over a period equivalent to the entire career of a medieval master carver. Thus, production must have been organised between workshops of specialised artisans, and because the works are so intricate, only a small number of workshops were likely involved in their production. That a majority of the miniatures share technical, stylistic and thematic similarities, they are often considered as a near homogeneous group. This view was first noted by the art historian Jaap Leeuwenberg, who cited such stylistic traits as broad and densely populated animated scenes, which are often placed, in the words of the art historian William Wixom, on "steeply angled ground planes of tiled floors".

Other shared features include spatial devices, figures in contemporary dress, and draperies arranged in angular folds. On this basis Leeuwenberg attributed a large number of the objects to Dircksz, around 35–40, although that estimate has been revised down in more recent years.

Because of shared characteristics, including common use of horror vacui, approaches and use of depth, as well as similar hinges and methods of construction, the art historian Jaap Leeuwenberg suggests that production of a number of the miniatures was overseen by a single master named Adam Dircksz. Dircksz was first identified through a signature on a prayer nut now in the Statens Museum Copenhagen, reading "Adam Theodrici me fecit" (Adam Dircksz has made me).

The Latin name "Adam Theodrici" may be translated into English as "Adam of Theodoric", but art historians usually use the Dutch version of his name, Adam Dircksz. Although it was rare in the 16th century for artists to sign a work, when done, it usually took the "me fecit" (made me) form, in effect of making the object speak.

== Style ==
Regardless of the number of works that Dircksz or his workshop can be attributed with, art historians often debate what the artistic and technical precedents for the miniatures might be. Dutch art historian Frits Scholten observes how, to a large extent, it seems "as if this exquisite sculpture was born ex nihilo around 1500", but points out that "giant strides are rarely made in art history", pointing to affinities with silversmith's art, especially the miniature architectural elements often found in ecclesiastical silver and ornaments.

== Gallery ==
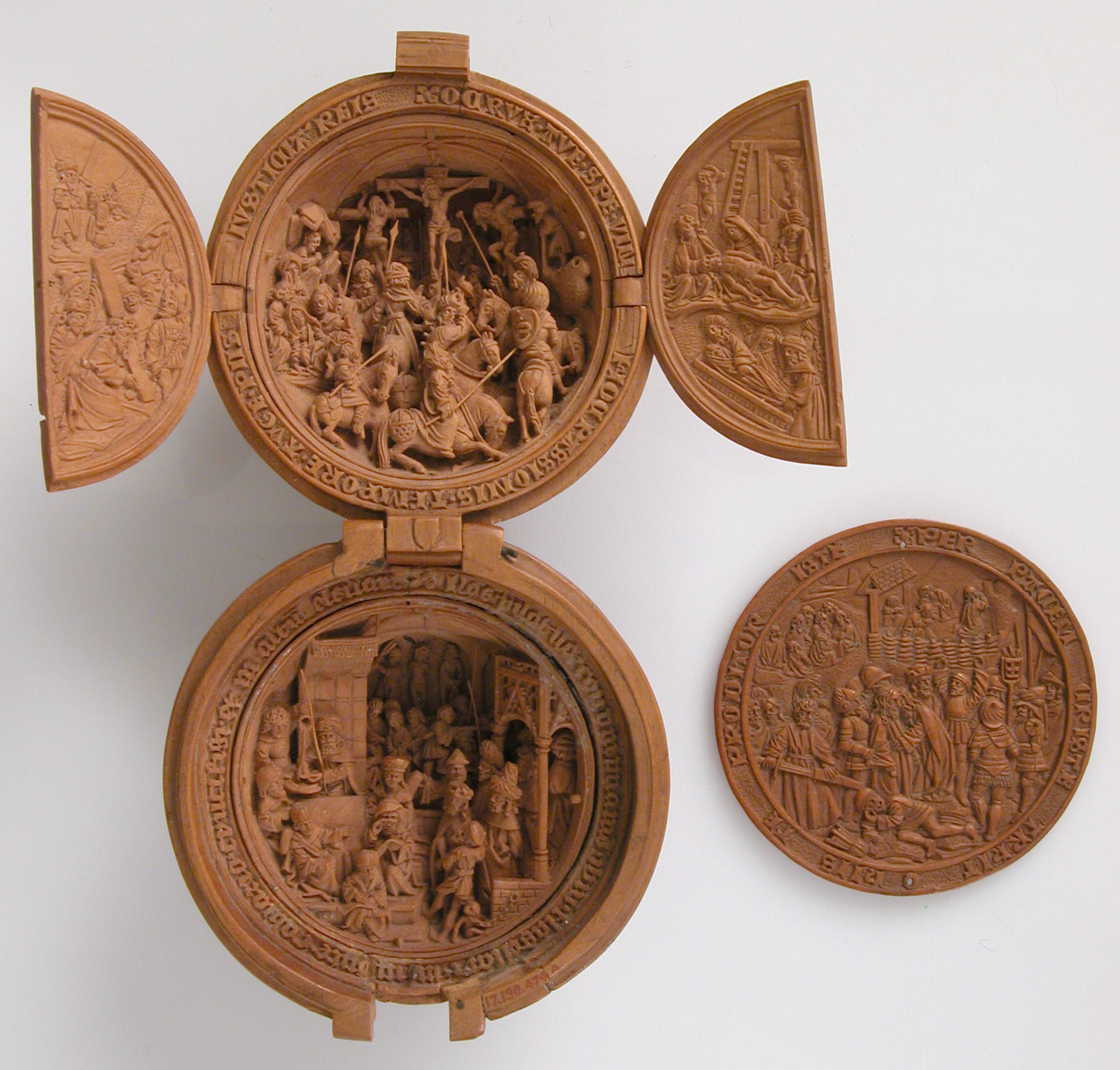
Prayer Bead with the Crucifixion and Jesus before Pilate. Metropolitan Museum of Art, New York

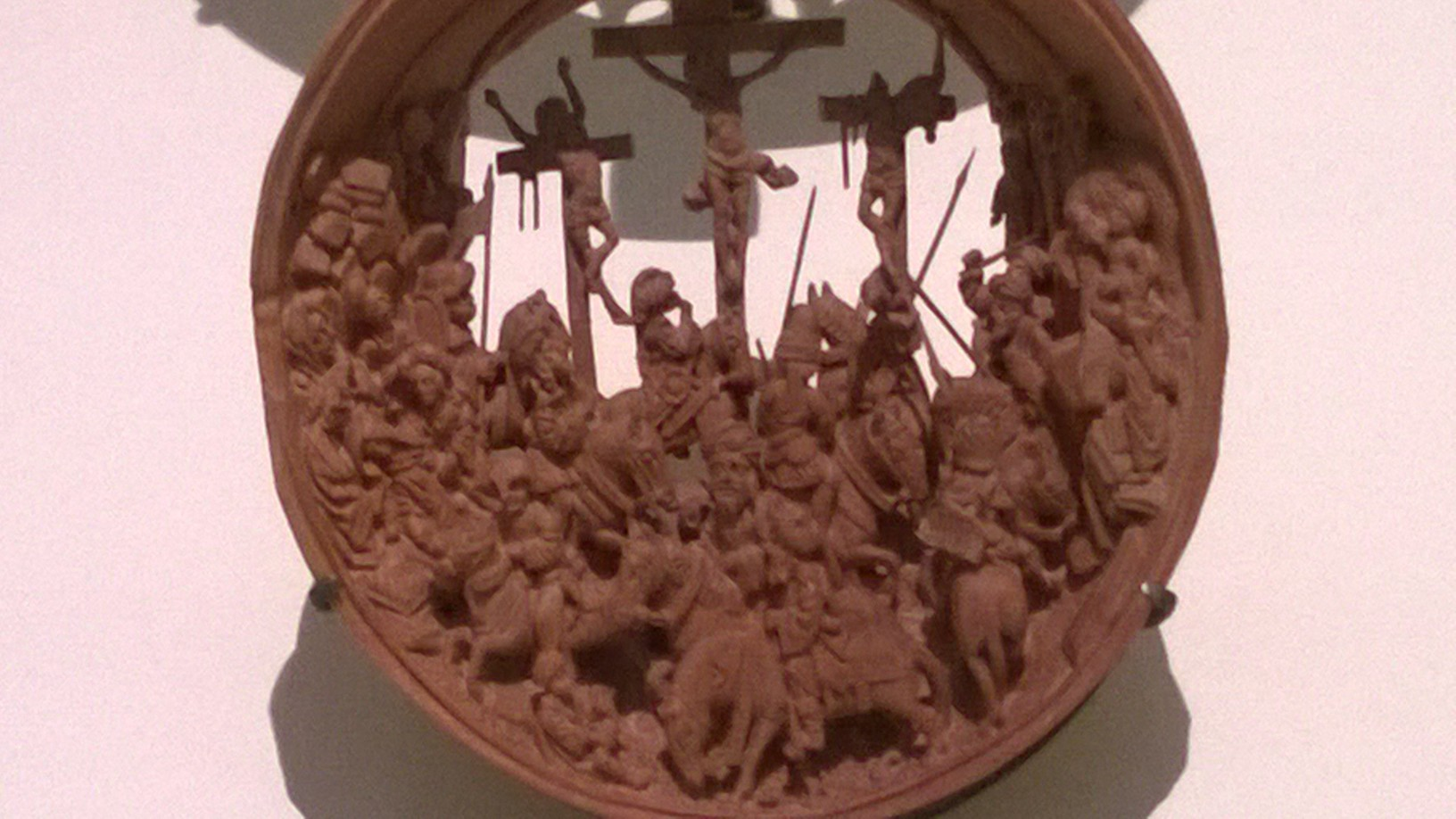
Prayer Bead with the Crucifixion and Jesus before Pilate (open), c. 1500–1530. Metropolitan Museum of Art, New York

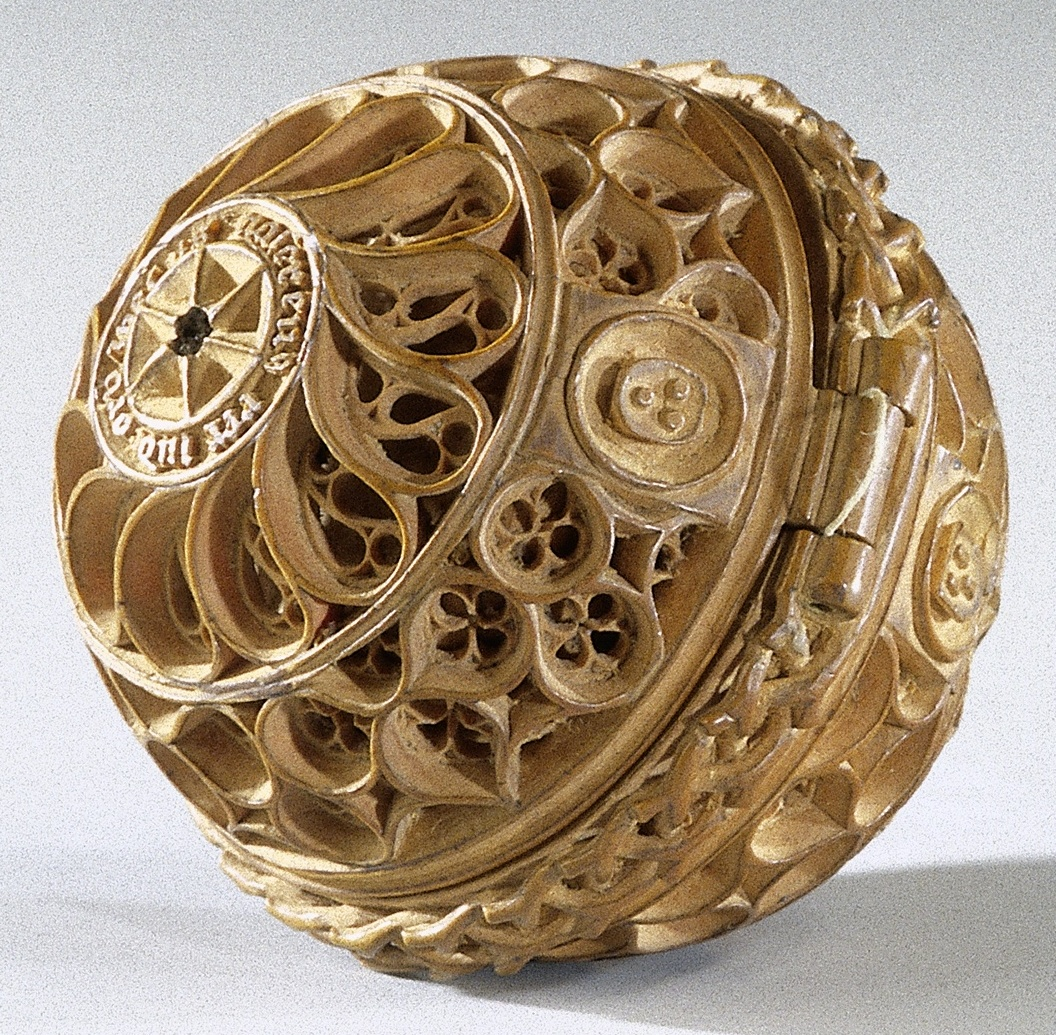
Prayer nut case with tracery, attributed to Adam Dircksz, c. 1500–1530. Rijksmuseum, Amsterdam

== Sources ==
- Boehm, Barbara Drake; Suda, Alexandra. "Handpicked: Collecting Boxwood Carvings from the Sixteenth to the Twenty-First Centuries." In: Scholten, Frits (ed), "Small Wonders: Late-Gothic Boxwood Micro-Carvings from the Low Countries". Amsterdam: Rijksmuseum, 2016.
- Ellis, Lisa; Suda, Alexandra. "Small Wonders: Gothic Boxwood Miniatures". Art Gallery of Ontario, 2016. ISBN 978-1-8942-4390-2
- Scholten, Frits. "A Prayer Nut in a Silver Housing by 'Adam Dirckz'". The Rijksmuseum Bulletin, volume 59, no. 4, 2011. pp. 322–347
- Van Os, H.W.; Filedt Kok, Jan Piet. Netherlandish Art in Rijksmuseum: 1400–1600. Ann Arbor, MI: Antique Collectors Club Limited, 2000. ISBN 978-9-0400-9376-0
- Wixom, William. "A Brabantine Boxwood Triptych". Bulletin of the Detroit Institute of Arts, volume 61, no. 1/2, Summer 1983. pp. 38–45
