= Miniature altarpiece (OA 5612) =

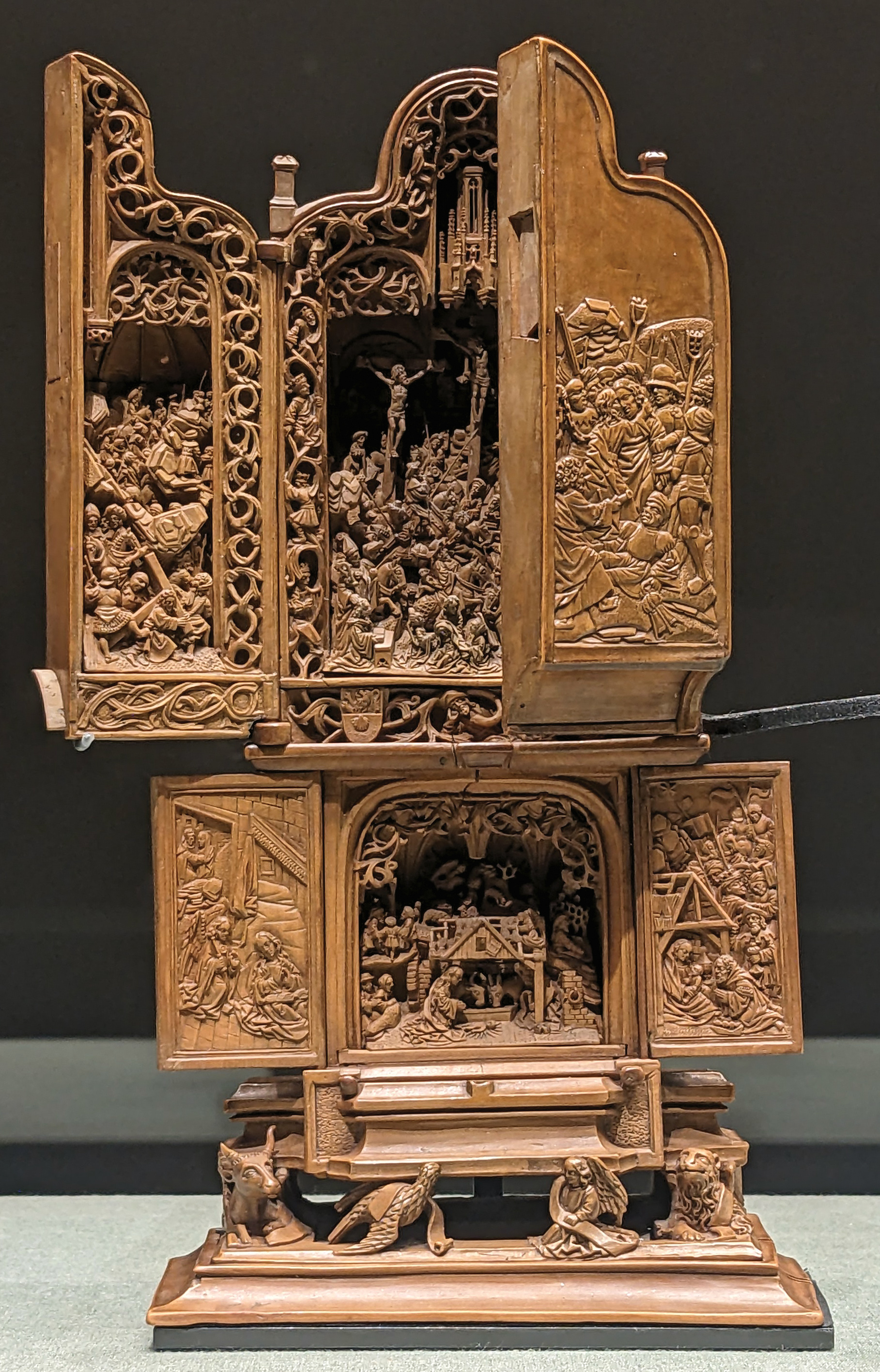
Triptych with scenes from the Life of Christ

The Miniature Altarpiece (OA 5612) is a Gothic boxwood miniature in the form of a small altarpiece, made in the Netherlands c. 1520–1530, probably by the workshop of Adam Dircksz (also known as Adam Theodrici), about whom almost nothing is known. It has been held by the Louvre (catalogue number OA 5612) since 1901, but is not on public display. It was displayed with other boxwood miniatures in 2016–17 in an exhibition that visited the Art Gallery of Ontario, the Metropolitan Museum of Art and the Rijksmuseum.

It was acquired by the Louvre in 1901 from the estate of Baron Adolph Carl von Rothschild; previously, it was in the collection of Edward Fitzalan-Howard, 1st Baron Howard of Glossop.

== Description ==
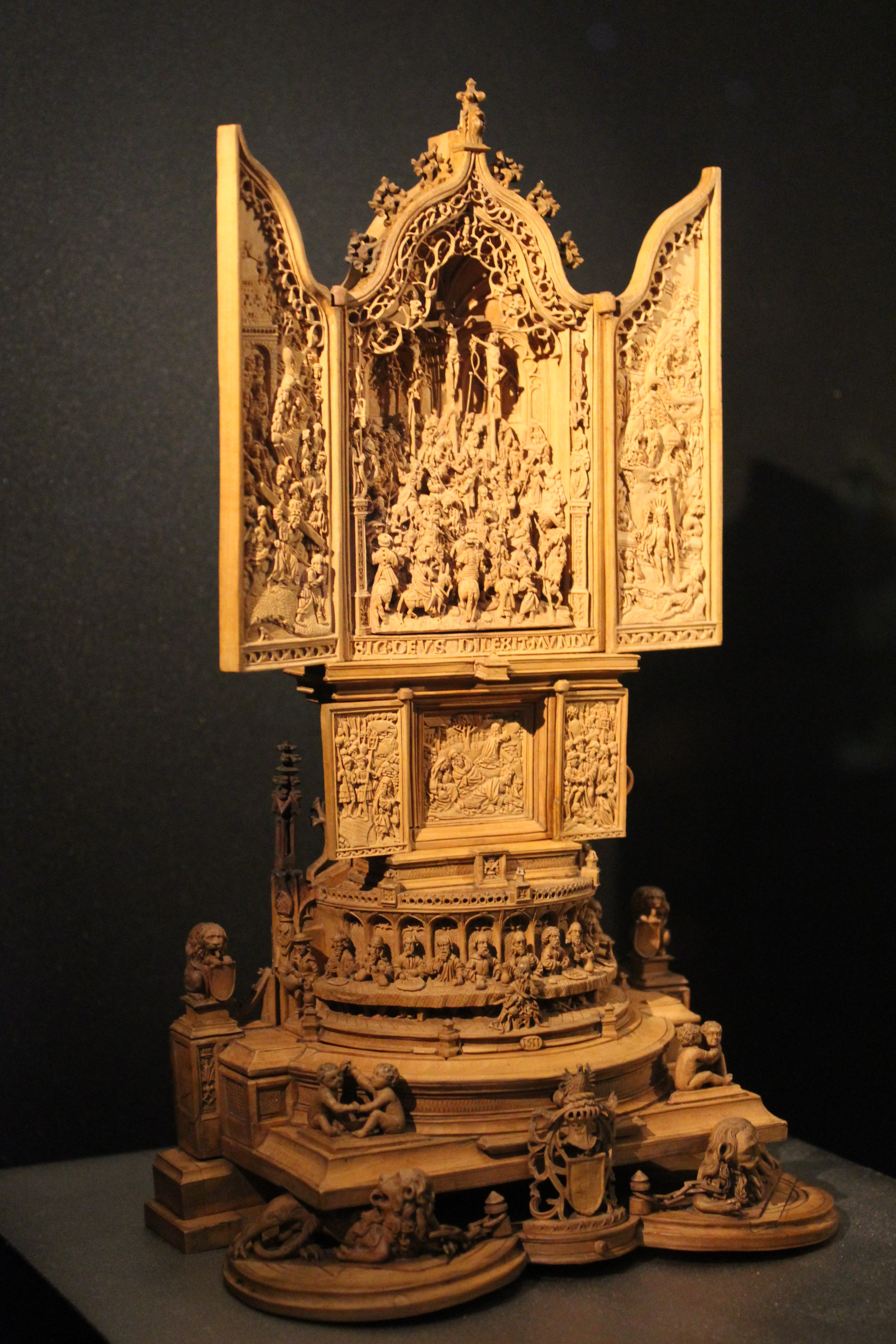
The similar portable altar in the British Museum, 1511, also thought to originate from Dircksz's workshop

The object is made from intricately carved boxwood. It comprises two main registers of carvings depicting Biblical scenes, each with a door that opens to reveal an interior triptych with further carvings of Biblical scenes, all standing on predella supported by tetramorph carvings of symbols representing the Four Evangelists (ox, eagle, angel, lion) on a wooden plinth. With the doors closed, the outside surfaces of the doors are elaborately decorated in Gothic style, with the upper pair of doors depicting Jesus at the Mount of Olives on the left, and the Kiss of Judas on the right, while the lower doors depict the Holy Kinship on the left, and Mary with her parents St Anne and St Joachim and a lamb on the right. It is held in the Louvre, Paris.

With the doors opened, it measures 192 mm × 101.9 mm × 14.2 mm (7.56 in × 4.01 in × 0.56 in). Inside, the upper register has a central carving of the Crucifixion with donor portraits with coats of arms and patron saints, flanked by the Christ Carrying the Cross on the left wing and the Descent from the Cross and Resurrection on the right wing. The lower register has a central carving of the Nativity of Jesus, with the Annunciation to the Shepherds in the background and the Adoration of the Shepherds on the lower left side, flanked to the left by an Annunciation, with Anne and Joachim at the Golden Gate in the background, and by the Adoration of the Magi to the right.

The rear is plain and undecorated, suggesting it was intended to be displayed against a wall. The original tooled and stamped leather case survives, decorated with the Tree of Jesse, and bearing an inscription down the sides: "O MATER DEI MEMENTO / MEI RIENS SANS PAIN" (Latin: "O mother of God, remember me"; and French: "nothing without bread").

It shares similarities with a similar boxwood altar in the British Museum, bequeathed by Rothschild's cousin Ferdinand de Rothschild in 1898. and which may or may not be also by Adam Dircksz. Both works share very a similar architectural five level structure, with an upper Crucifixion triptych. Both works contain highly stylized figures, which resemble a third example in the Charlottenborg Palace, in Copenhagen, Denmark.

== Sources ==
- Thornton, Dora. A Rothschild Renaissance: The Waddesdon Bequest. London: British Museum Press, 1985. ISBN 978-0-7141-2345-5
