= Miniature altarpiece with the Crucifixion =

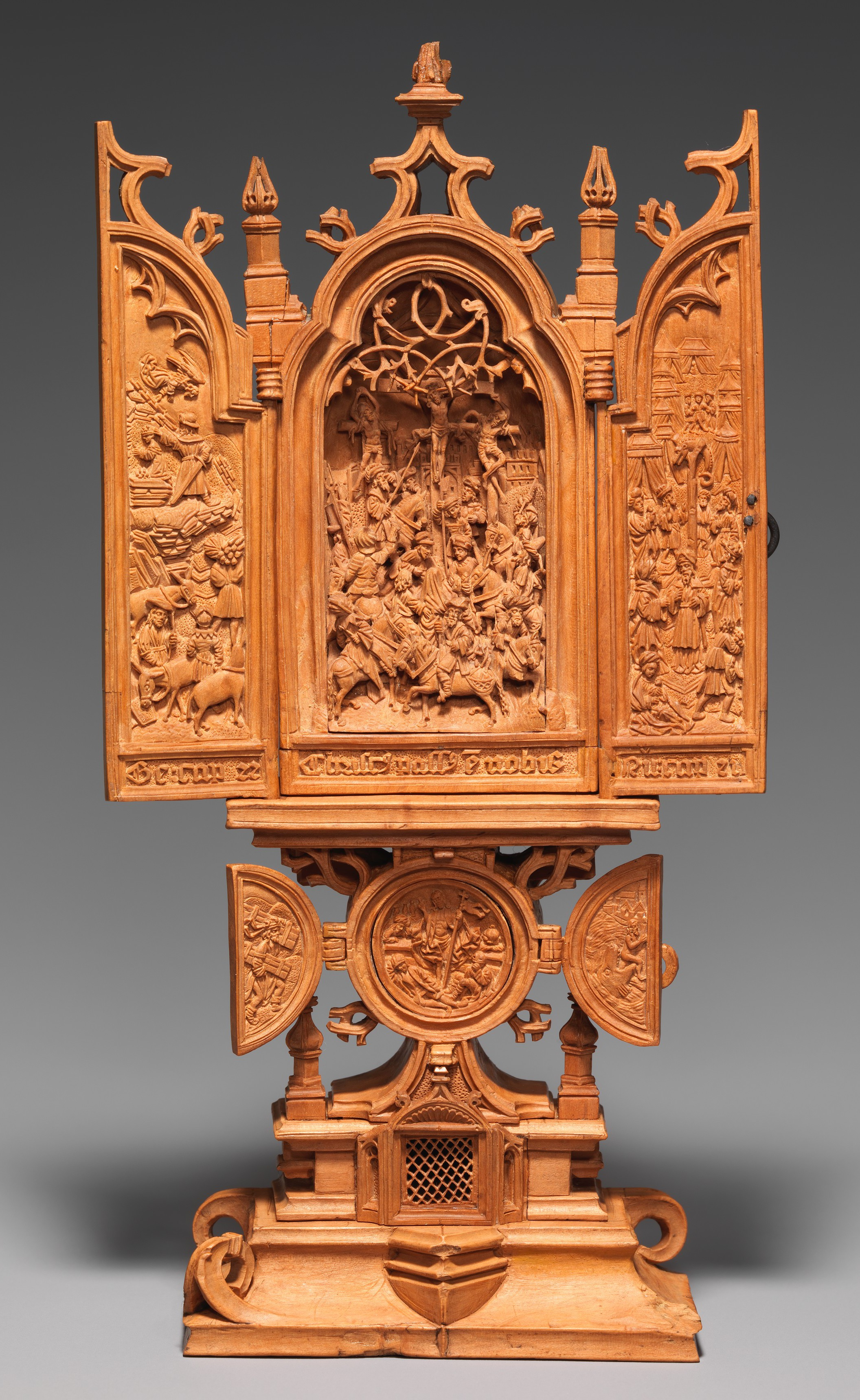
Miniature Altarpiece with the Crucifixion, early 16th century. Metropolitan Museum of Art, New York

Miniature Altarpiece with the Crucifixion (MA 17.1690.453) is a very small and complex (15 × 7.6 × 3.2 cm) early 16th century Netherlandish microcarved miniature sculpture in boxwood, now in The Cloisters, New York. The central carvings of the upper triptych show the Crucifixion and Resurrection of Jesus; each outer wing contains two scenes from the biblical Old Testament. The complex base contains a round carving which opens like a boxwood prayer nut.

Works of this type are extremely rare, and because of this piece's layered structure, extremely fragile. Only about 150 Gothic boxwood miniatures survive; and of these only some twenty are multi-panel, i.e. triptych or diptychs like altarpieces. The Cloisters acquired the piece in 1917 as part of the J. Pierpont Morgan donation. Until 1906 it had been in the collection of Baron Albert Oppenheim, Cologne.

== Description ==
=== Central reliefs ===
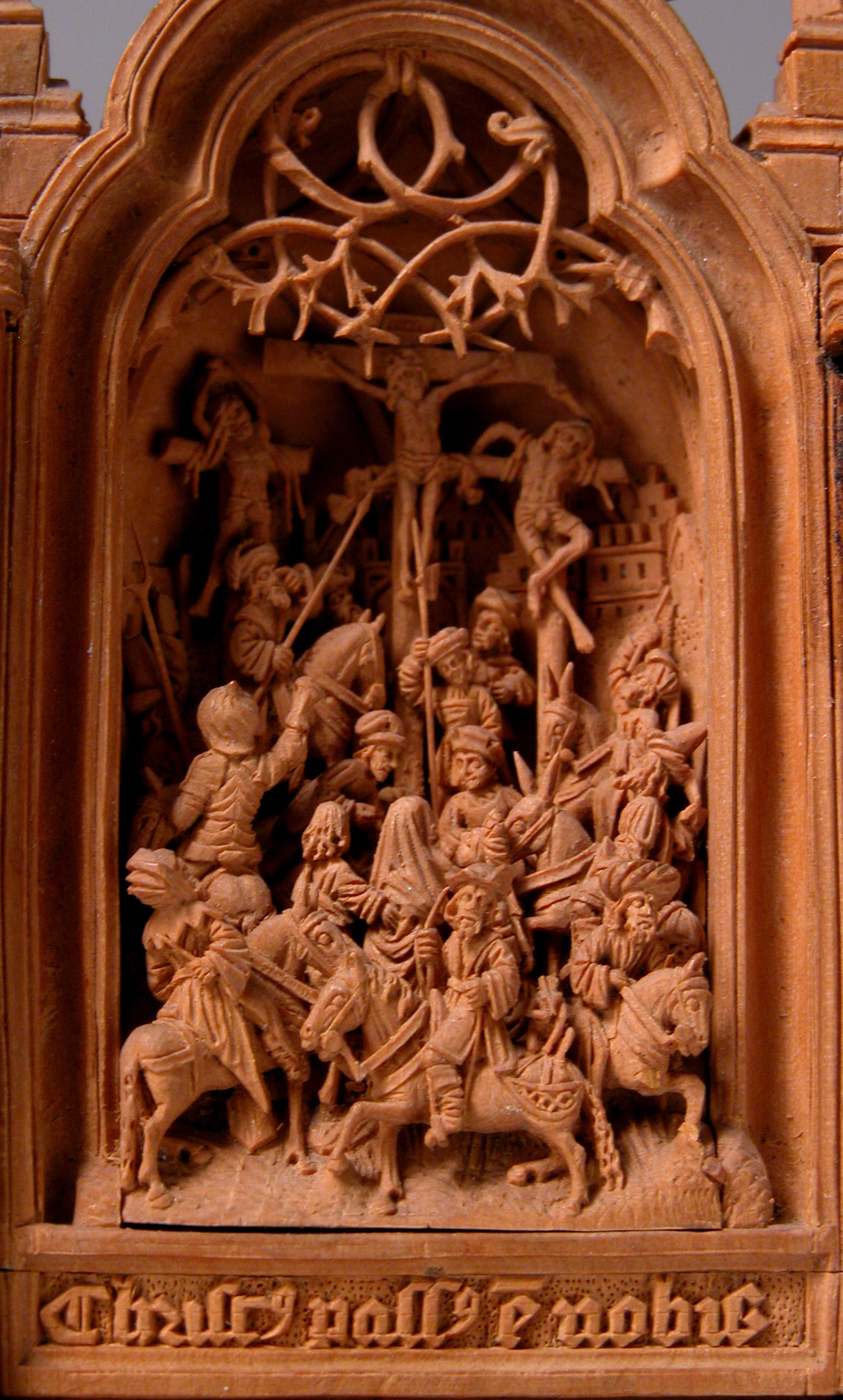
Detail, Crucifixion. The inscription at the footing reads Christ pass[us] e[st] [pro] nobis.

The upper portion of the central relief shows the Crucifixion of Jesus and the thieves, the lower half shows the Resurrection. Also shown is The Virgin kneeling with her attendants. Inscriptions in the central panel reads Christ pass[us] e[st] [pro] nobis (Christ suffered for us), from the 1st century Epistle 1 Peter 2:21.

This panel was built up from three separate layers of reliefs, the foreground shows the three horsemen visible, the mid-ground shows Mary kneeling with her attendants surrounded by other horseman, the last shows Jesus and the thieves hanging on their crosses. Other details include standing figures and horsemen at the base and either sides of the cross, and a figure holding a fork on the right side of the background. Behind them all is a cityscape.

=== Wings ===
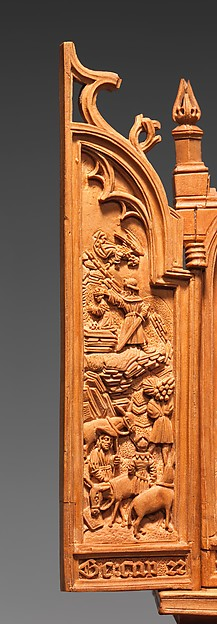
Left wing with Abraham and Samson

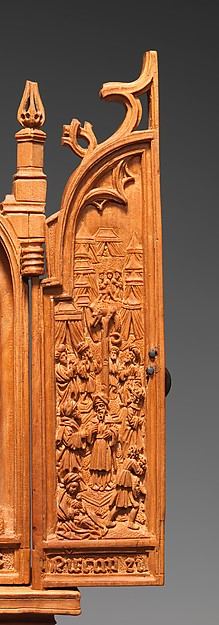
Right wing with Moses and Jonah

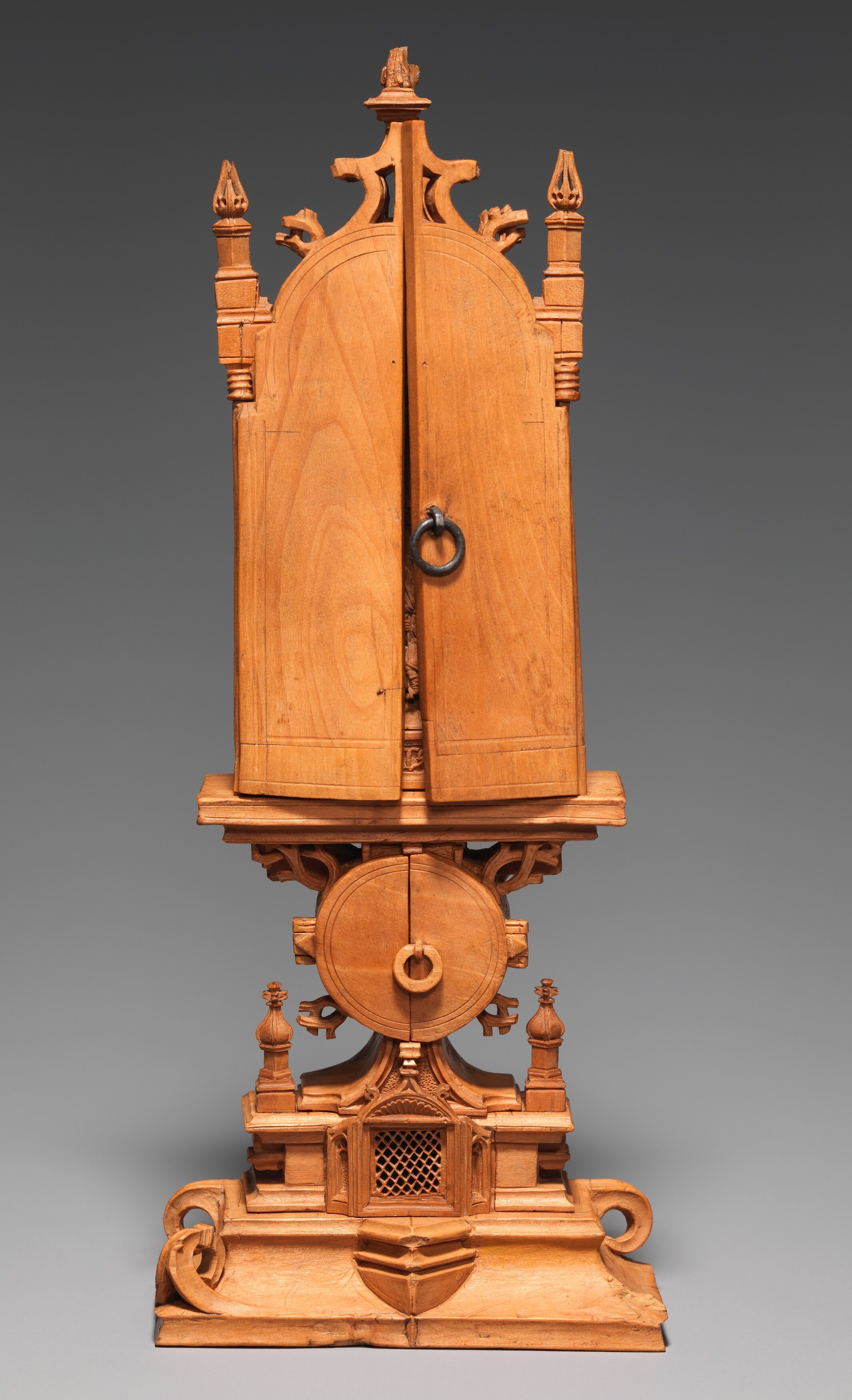
Reverse

The outer wings can be folded inwards; the outer faces are blank. The carved inside face of each wing contains two scenes from the Old Testament. They are depictions of the Sacrifice of Abraham on the upper left, Samson carrying the Doors of Gaza at lower left, Moses and the Brazen Serpent on the upper right, and Jonah and the Whale on the lower right.

Each wing contains a carved inscription; "Ge[nesis]" (left), and "Nu[mbers]" (right).

== Sources ==
- Ainsworth, Maryan; Christiansen; Keith. From Van Eyck to Bruegel: Early Netherlandish Painting in The Metropolitan Museum of Art. New York: The Metropolitan Museum of Art, 1998
- Breck, Joseph, and Meyric, Rogers. "The Pierpont Morgan Wing: A Handbook". New York: The Metropolitan Museum of Art, 1925
- Ellis, Lisa; Suda, Alexandra. "Small Wonders: Gothic Boxwood Miniatures". Art Gallery of Ontario, 2016. ISBN 978-1-8942-4390-2
