= Alexandra Suda =

Canadian art historian and curator

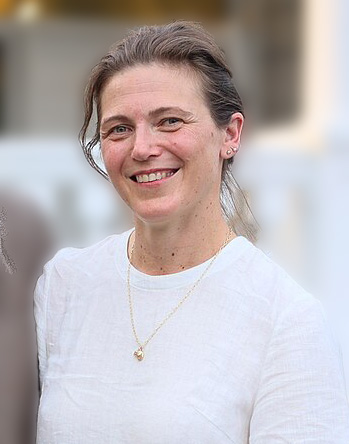
- Alexandra "Sasha" Suda in 2022
- Born: 1981; Ontario, Canada
- Education: Princeton University (BA); Williams College (MA); New York University (PhD)
- Known for: Art history former CEO of the Philadelphia Art Museum.

Alexandra Suda (born 1981) is a Canadian art historian who was director of the National Gallery of Canada, and, from 2022 to 2025, was director and chief executive officer of the Philadelphia Museum of Art.

== Early life and education ==
Suda was born in 1981 in Toronto, Ontario (Note: Another source states that Suda was born in Orillia, Ontario.) to immigrants from Czechoslovakia. She completed a BA at Princeton University and an MA at Williams College before earning her PhD at The Institute of Fine Arts at New York University. Suda's doctoral dissertation, "The Making of Girona Martyrology and the Cult of Saints in Late Medieval Bohemia," and was published in 2016.

== Career ==
Suda's career as an art historian began at the Metropolitan Museum of Art in New York City. She held a variety of positions at the Museum in the Medieval Department between 2003 and 2011.

In 2011, Suda became an assistant curator at the Art Gallery of Ontario in Toronto. She later became the Curator of European Art at the Gallery. According to the Governor General's Canadian Leadership Conference, her Small Wonders: Gothic Boxwood Miniatures exhibition, held in Ontario, New York, and Amsterdam, "received extensive positive press for its high level of scholarship which is driven by the public's curiosity about these wondrous works of art." While at the Gallery, Suda re-worked the European art collection and its presentation to better engage a broader audience.

=== National Gallery of Canada ===
In April 2019, Suda was named director and CEO of the National Gallery of Canada. At the time of her appointment at age 38, she was the youngest person to hold this post at the Gallery in more than a century.

Critics have argued that Suda was relatively inexperienced for the position at the National Gallery, and did not speak French as well as English. Some of her actions (and those of her interim successor, Angela Cassie) in support of the strategic plan and “decolonization” were described as being directed by "dogma". Restructuring and significant staff dismissals were criticized as creating an unstable environment and losing key institutional knowledge from the institution.

=== Philadelphia Museum of Art ===
In June 2022, the Philadelphia Museum of Art announced that Suda would assume the role of director at the Museum in September of that year. The title of the position is the George D. Widener Director and CEO.

In September 2022, workers at that museum held a strike over wages and working conditions which lasted 19 days. The strike started within days of Suda's being installed as director, but the labor dispute had been ongoing well before Suda's arrival at the Museum. In her previous position at the Art Gallery of Ontario, Suda had been a labor union member.

She stayed publicly silent on the matter: a Museum spokesperson said she would not be part of the negotiations. Later, Suda stated that the labor settlement "laid a solid foundation."

On November 4, 2025, when Suda was three years into her five-year contract, she was terminated by the Board of Directors after overseeing a controversial rebranding of the Museum. Following her termination, Suda sued the Board for wrongful dismissal and the Board counter-sued Suda for giving herself unauthorized raises.

== Selected publications ==
- Suda, Alexandra; Ellis, Lisa. "Small Wonders: Gothic Boxwood Miniatures". Art Gallery of Ontario, 2016.
- Suda, Alexandra, Boehm, Barbara Drake. "Handpicked: Collecting Boxwood Carvings from the Sixteenth to the Twenty-First Centuries." In: Scholten, Frits (ed), "Small Wonders: Late-Gothic Boxwood Micro-Carvings from the Low Countries". Amsterdam: Rijksmuseum, 2016.
- "The Girona Martyrology: Belief in the guise of Violence and Beauty". Autopsia: Blut- und Augenzeugen, 2014
