= Miniature altarpiece (V&A 225-1866) =

Gothic boxwood miniature

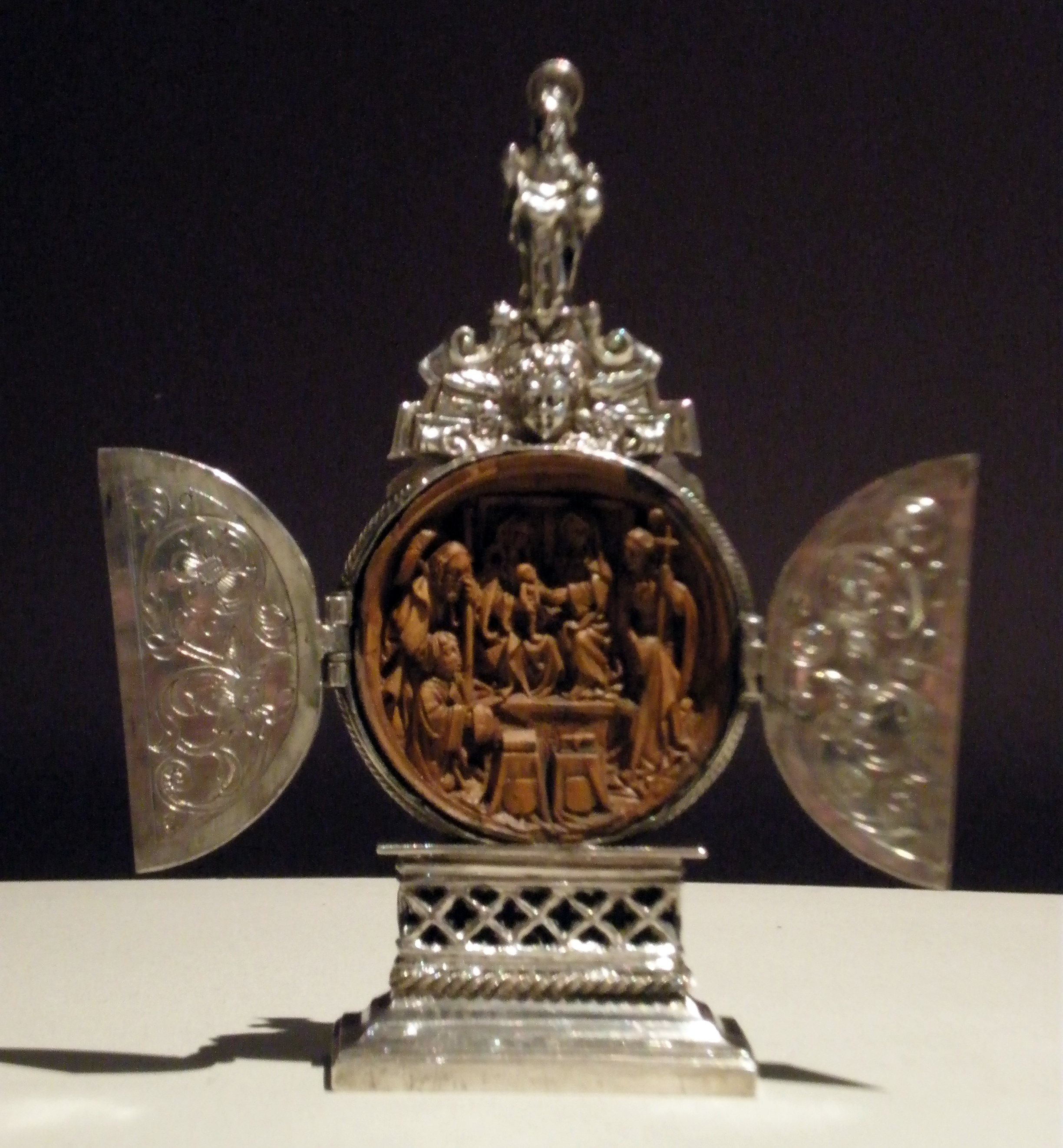
Miniature altar, boxwood and silver, c. 1500–20, Netherlandish. Height: 9.3 cm. Victoria and Albert Museum, London

The Miniature Altarpiece (or Miniature Altarpiece: Anna Selbdritt) in the Victoria and Albert Museum, London, is a small, 9.3 cm-high, Gothic boxwood miniature triptych completed in the Netherlands c. 1500–1520. The central carving is made from boxwood and shows a relief of the Virgin and Child attended by two saints, thought to be Anne (who is shown with wings and holding a large crucifix) and James the Great (who wears a hat and holds a staff). The outer semi-circular wings and shell are lined with silver and decorated with foliate designs. It stands on a silver plinth with pierced quatrefoils, and is topped by a cherub's head and a statuette of God the Father. It is thought that the silver-work was added between 1550 and 1570.

Two lay figures kneel at prayer desks before the saints; presumably these are the object's donors or commissioners.The man on the viewer's left is presented by Saint James; the woman is on our right and is presented by Saint Michael.

The sculpture's dimensions are 89.6 mm × 34.5 mm × 20 mm (3.53 in × 1.36 in × 0.79 in). It has the accession number 225-1866, having been acquired for £14 at the Le Charpentier sale at the Hôtel Drouot on 23 May 1866. There is no record of its provenance before this point. It is not currently on display.
