= Gothic boxwood miniature =

Early 16th-century wood carving from the Low Countries

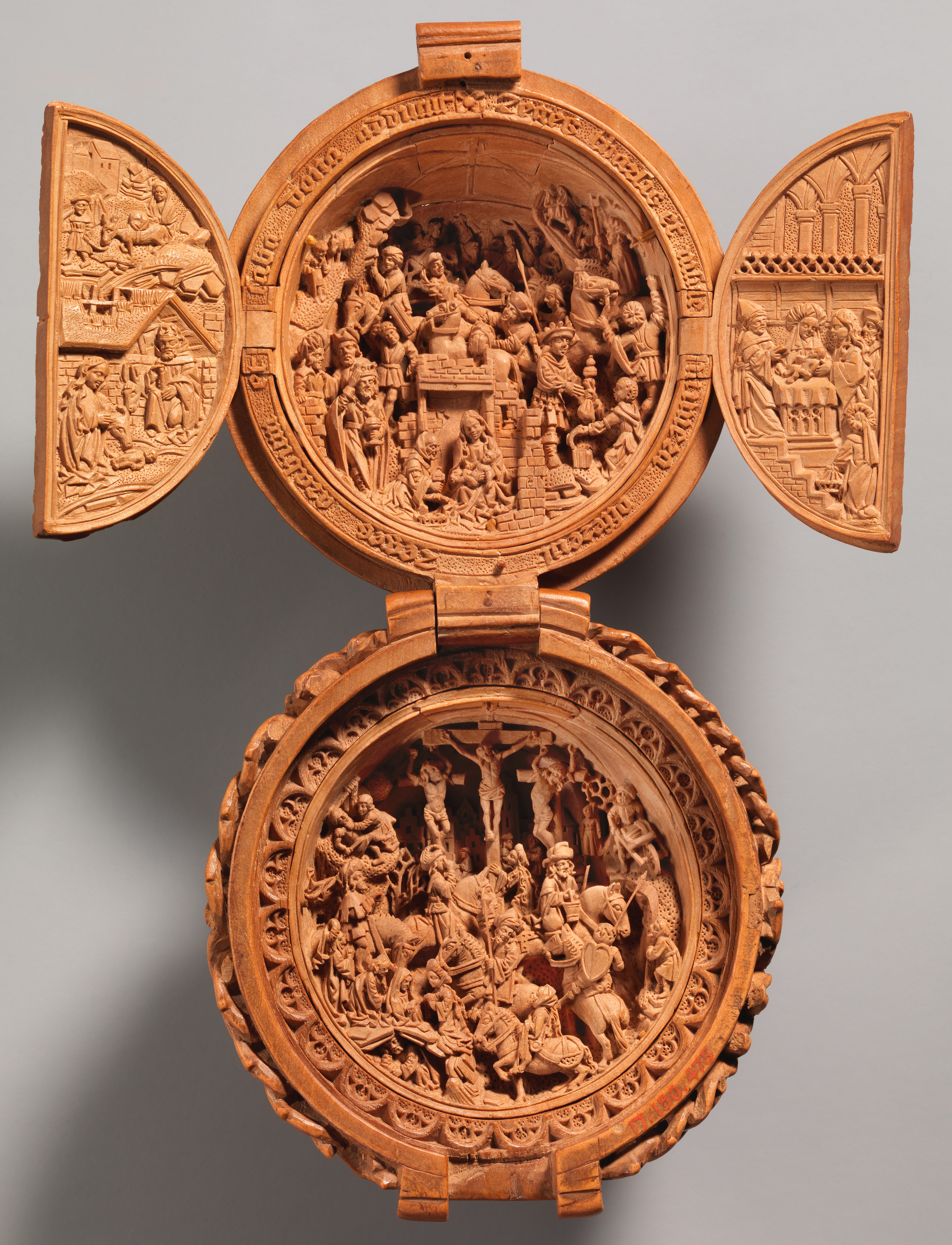
Prayer bead with the Adoration of the Magi and the Crucifixion, South Netherlandish. 1500–1510. Height (open): 11.2 cm (4.4 in). The Cloisters, New York.

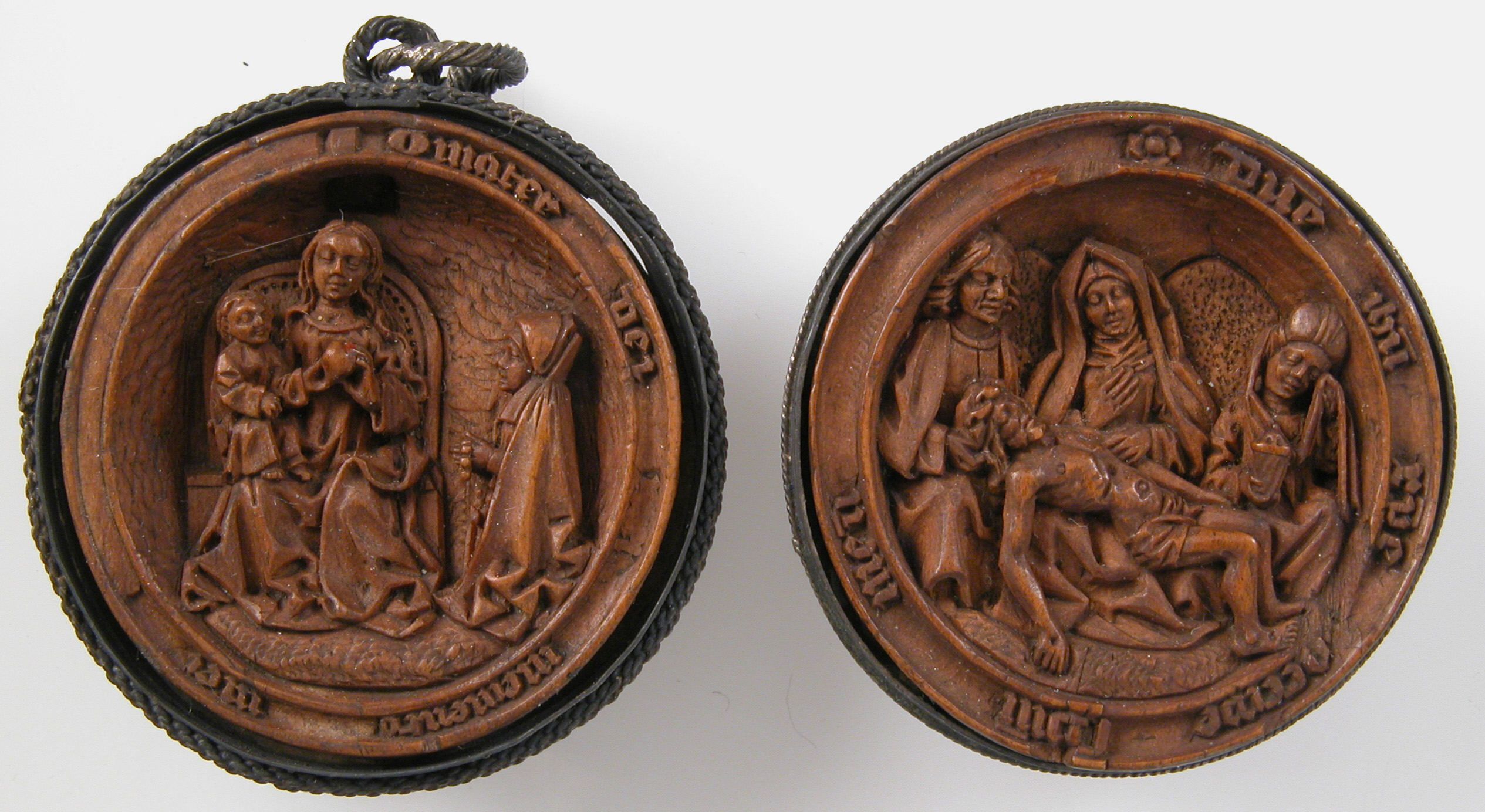
Prayer bead with the Prayer of the Rosary and the Lamentation. Netherlandish, early 16th century. Height: 3 cm (1.2 in). Metropolitan Museum of Art, New York.

Gothic boxwood miniatures are very small Christian-themed wood sculptures produced during the 15th and 16th centuries in the Low Countries, at the end of the Gothic period and during the emerging Northern Renaissance. They consist of highly intricate layers of reliefs, often rendered to nearly microscopic level, and are made from boxwood, which has a fine grain and high density suitable for detailed micro-carving. There are around 150 surviving examples; most are spherical rosary beads (known as prayer nuts), statuettes, skulls, or coffins; some 20 are in the form of polyptychs, including triptych and diptych altarpieces, tabernacles and monstrances. The polyptychs are typically 10–13 cm (3.9–5.1 in) in height. Most of the beads are 10–15 cm (3.9–5.9 in) in diameter and designed so they could be held in the palm of a hand, hung from necklaces or belts, or worn as fashionable accessories.

Boxwood miniatures were highly prized in the early 16th century. Their iconography, form, and utility can be linked to medieval ivory carvings, as well as contemporary illuminated miniatures, altarpieces, panel paintings, sculpture, woodcuts, and engravings. They typically contain imagery from the life of Mary, the Crucifixion of Jesus, or vistas of Heaven and Hell. Each miniature's production required exceptional craftsmanship, suggesting that they were commissioned by high-ranking nobles.

A number of the miniatures appear to have come from a workshop led by Adam Dircksz, who is thought to have produced dozens of such works. Almost nothing is known about him or the artisans who produced the miniatures. Some of their original owners can be identified from markings included by the sculptor, usually initials or coats of arms. Important collections of boxwood miniatures are in the Art Gallery of Ontario, in the British Museum as part of the Waddesdon Bequest, and at the Metropolitan Museum of Art, New York. Because of their rarity and the difficulty in discerning their intricacy from reproductions, boxwood miniatures have not been as widely studied as other forms of Netherlandish visual art.

== Production ==
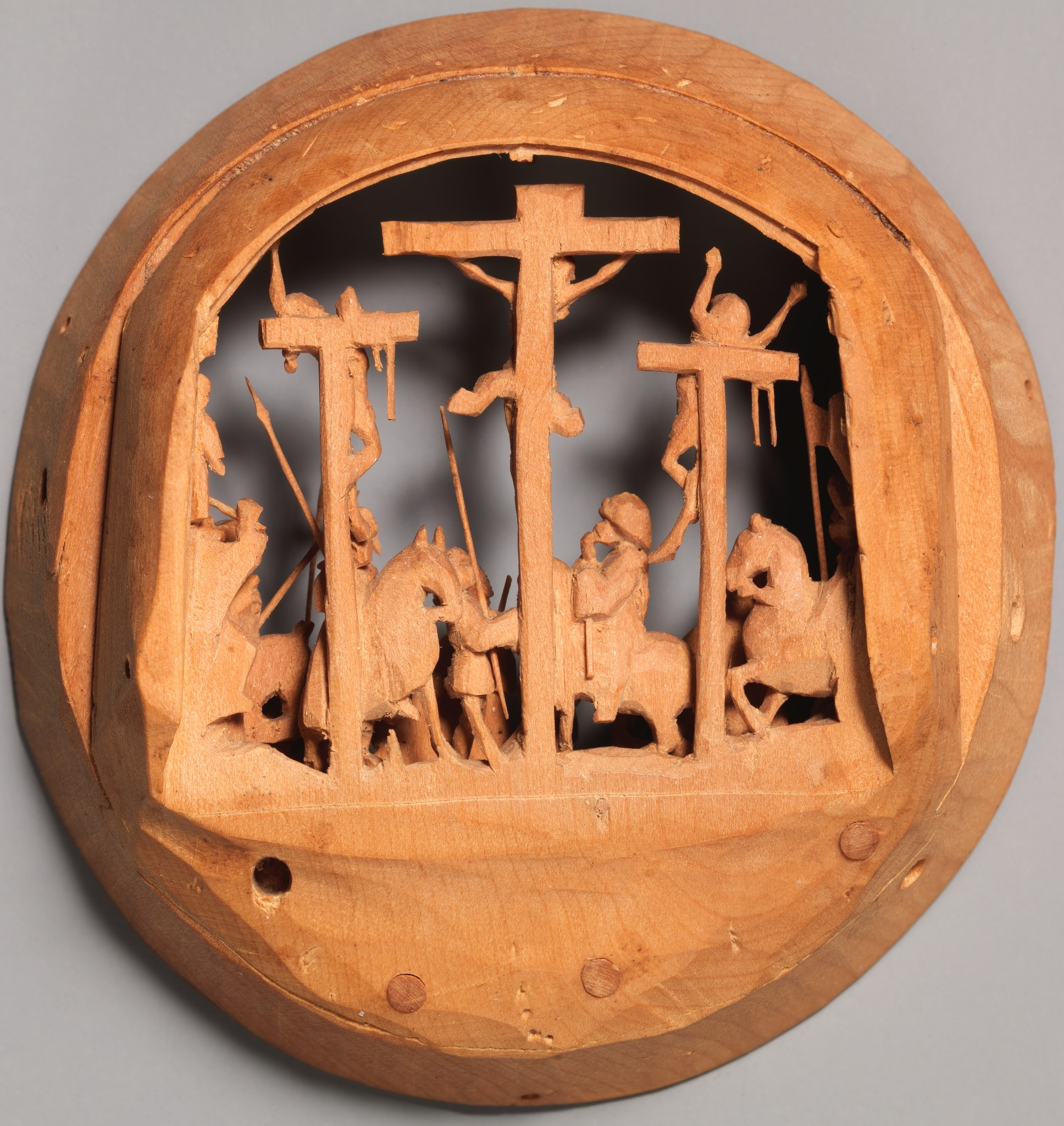
The reverse of one of the four discs making up the interior Crucifixion relief from Half of a prayer bead with the Crucifixion (17.190.473b) prayer nut, early 16th century, Netherlandish. Height: 5.7 cm (2.2 in). Metropolitan Museum of Art, New York.

Boxwood is a dense hardwood with fine grain, resistant to splitting and chipping, making it ideal for wood carving. In the 16th century, wooden blocks used for woodblock printing were usually made of boxwood. The uses for boxwood were similar to those for ivory in medieval carvings, however boxwood was a far less expensive option. Designs were overseen by master craftsmen who must have had access to prints and woodcuts of contemporary works of art, and who were apparently influenced by diptych and triptych panel paintings.

Boxwood grows slowly, and the trunk remains fairly narrow, a fact that limits the size of any carvings made from any single piece. The wood assumes an even, soft, and tactile surface if polished or frequently handled, such as was the case for prayer nuts. The wood loses its tactility when painted, explaining why most of the miniatures are in monochrome. Polychromy reduced the legibility of the carvings, "quite apart from the difficulty of effectively coloring such tiny and complex scenes" as the art historian Frits Scholten has noted.

The tools used in production were similar to those used in the production of larger altarpieces, and included saws, planes, card scrapers, chisels, augers, braces and gimlets. Wood was cut into the required dimensions as blocks, after which the joints were carved out. Prayer beads were turned on a lathe. The woodcutters carved a single block of boxwood into a sphere, cut it in half, hollowed it out, and attached a fastening hinge and carrying loops. The carvings in the interiors were typically made separately from the smaller hemispheres and later fitted onto an outer shell. In some cases, these wooden shells were placed in silver housing.

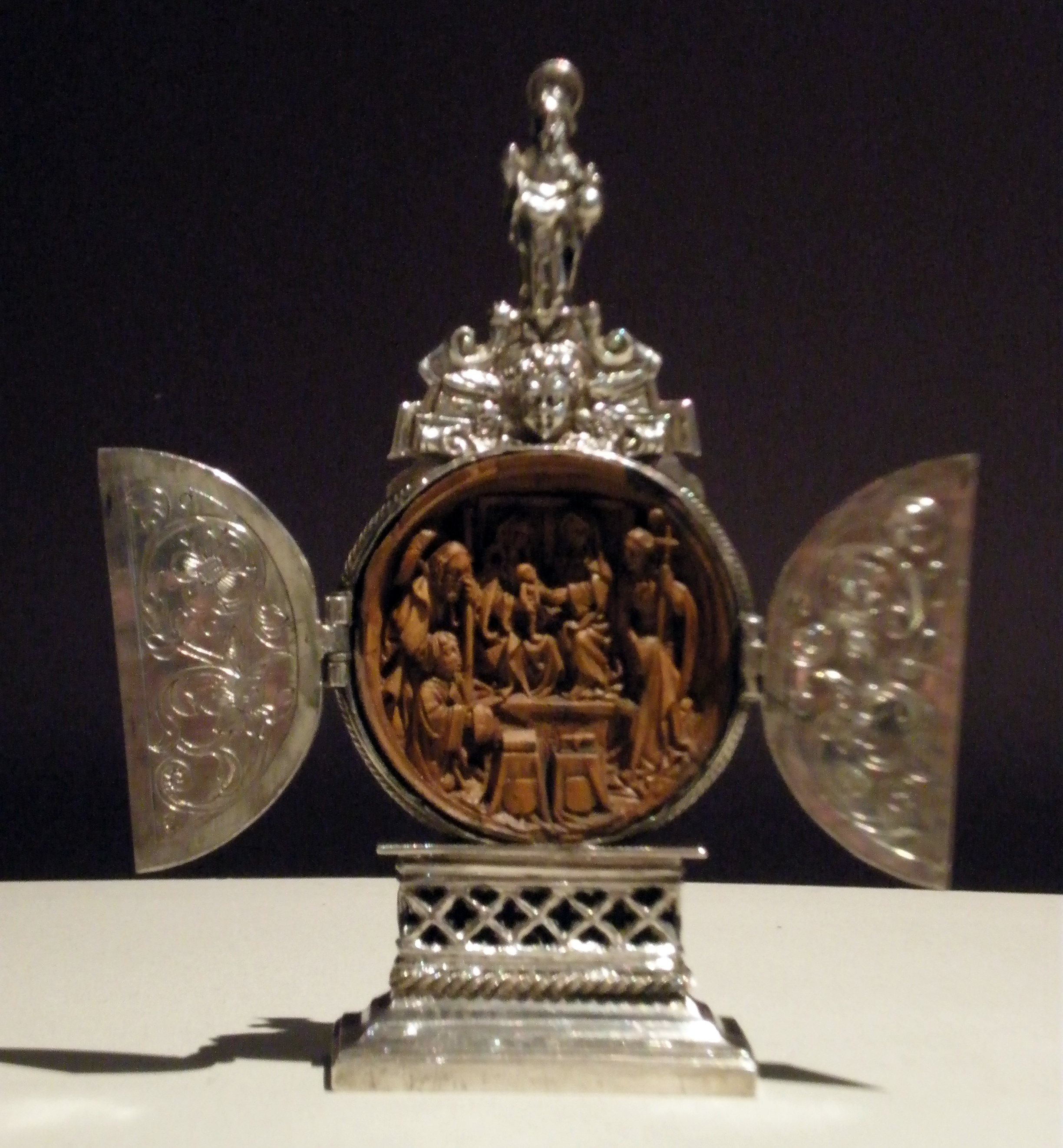
Miniature altarpiece, boxwood and silver, c. 1500–1570, Netherlandish. Height: 9.3 cm (3.7 in). Victoria and Albert Museum, London.

Because of the diminutive scale of the pieces, magnifying glasses were used in their production. The very small wood pieces were difficult to brace (hold in place) during carving. They were probably positioned on a bench, between two posts, so that they could be turned around. Domed spaces, intended to evoke church architecture, were drilled or carved, and these were divided using compasses and a straightedge into pie-shaped segments. A surface plane was established onto which the reliefs were added. These were created from multiple separate wood sheets, individually produced before being joined in layers. Major figures, usually saints, were carved from single blocks of wood. Relief components were either glued into prefixed niches, or they were bound with pegs, which were sometimes functional and obviously visible or implanted into the relief form. Because of this layered structure, they are often fragile.

An example of this layering technique is in the "Last Judgement" prayer bead (AGO 29365) attributed to Adam Dircksz and now located at the Art Gallery of Ontario, where some thirty minuscule, individually carved spikes are set into the ceiling vault and around Christ to suggest rays of light. Punctuations in the wood suggesting stars were added to the ceiling via tiny drilled holes.

The level of detail indicates the use of magnification in their production, probably with the same instruments used by contemporary jewelers. Describing these intricacies, the art historian Eve Kahn writes that the works can be so rich that "individual feathers are visible on angel wings, and dragon skins are textured with thick scales. Crumbling shacks are shown with shingles missing from their gabled roofs. Saints' robes and soldiers' uniforms are trimmed with buttons and embroidery, and there are minute representations of jewelry and rosary beads."

== Attribution and dating ==
Only one miniature is explicitly dated, a triptych (WB.232) in the Waddesdon Bequest at the British Museum is inscribed with "1511". A minority bear a coat of arms or other indications of origin or the source of commission. A carving in the Musée de Cluny, Paris, contains the letter "M", and must have been completed before the 1524 inventory of Margaret of Austria. Approximate dates for other examples can be inferred from the inventories of their owners. The rosary beads owned by Henry VIII of England must have been produced between his marriage to Catherine of Aragon in 1509 and his earliest efforts to separate from her in 1526.

Most surviving boxwood miniatures are attributed to Northern Renaissance artisans working in the Burgundian and Habsburg Netherlands during the late 15th and early 16th centuries. Due to their quality and stylistic similarities to the full-sized Flemish and Brabantine altarpieces, they were for centuries assumed to originate from Southern Netherlands. However, more recent research has found that a majority of the early owners came from the northern provinces of Holland and Zeeland. There are examples from Italy, although according to Wilhelm Bode, "The broad monumental tendency of Italian art, especially in sculpture, seems to exclude a taste for daintily executed small works." German examples include a carving encased in a miniature skull, now in the Art Gallery of Ontario, which contains branchwork (Astwerk) of a type often found in contemporary German sculpture.

That a majority of the miniatures share technical, stylistic, and thematic similarities, and could be considered as a near homogeneous group was first noted by the art historian Jaap Leeuwenberg. Such stylistic traits include broad and densely populated animated scenes, often placed, in the words of the art historian William Wixom, on "steeply angled ground planes of tiled floors." Other shared features include spatial devices, figures in contemporary dress, and draperies arranged in angular folds. On this basis, Leeuwenberg attributed a large number of the objects to Dircksz, around 35–40, although that estimate has been revised down in more recent years.

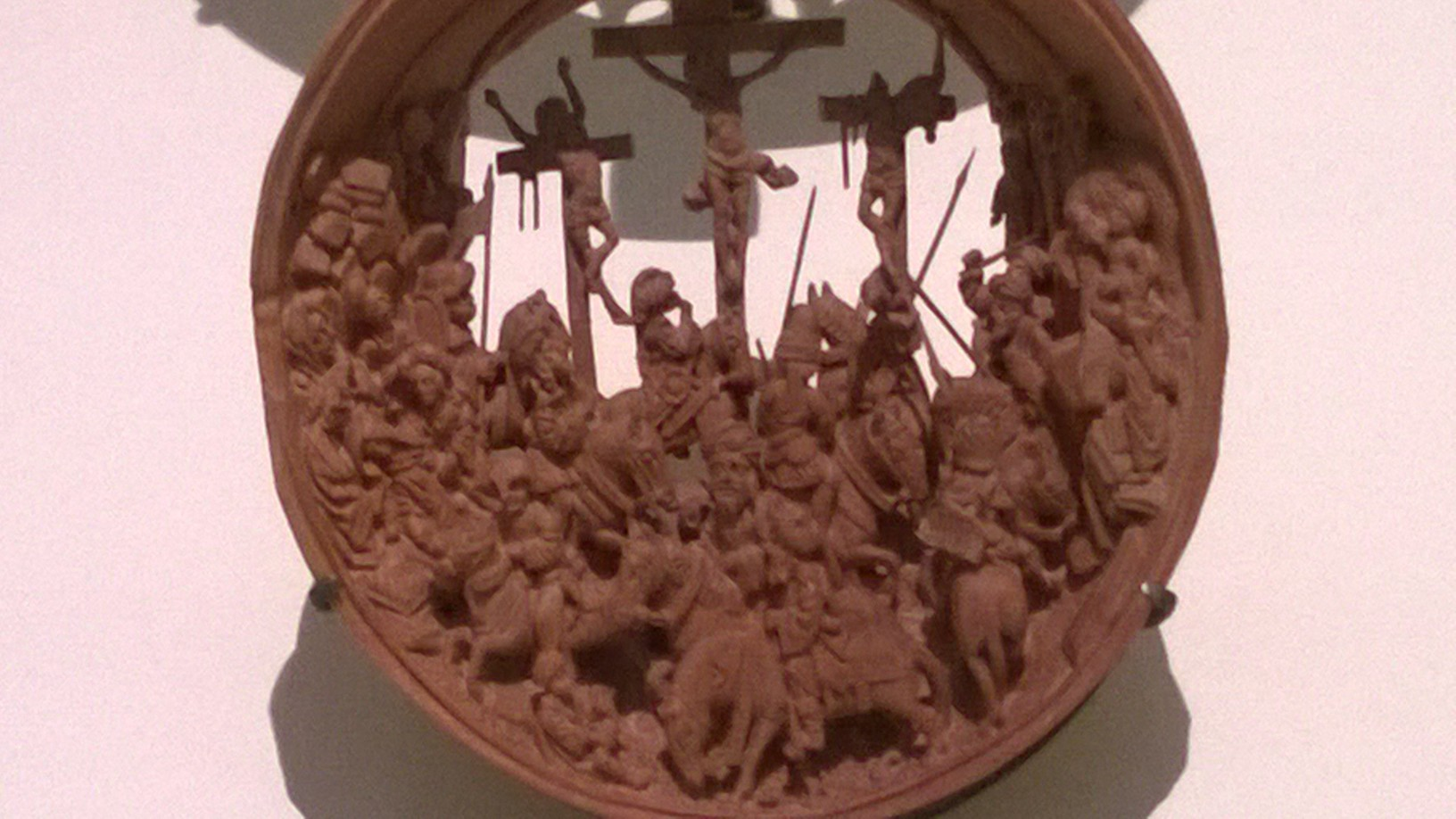
Prayer bead with the Crucifixion and Jesus before Pilate (open), c. 1500–1530. Metropolitan Museum of Art, New York.

Production of the boxwood miniatures was organized between different workshops of specialized artisans. Because the miniatures are so intricate, only a small number of workshops were probably involved in their production. Due to this high degree of artistry, art historians presume they were intended as luxury items and status symbols for a high-born and sophisticated European elite; Henry VIII and Catherine, Emperor Charles V and Albert V of Bavaria are known to have owned individual boxwood miniatures.

=== Adam Dircksz ===
Because of shared characteristics, including the common use of horror vacui, similar spatial approaches and use of depth, as well as similar hinges and methods of construction, Leeuwenberg has suggested that production of a number of the miniatures was overseen by Adam Dircksz, Dircksz was first identified through a signature on a prayer nut now in the Statens Museum Copenhagen, reading "Adam Theodrici me fecit" (Adam Dircksz has made me). The Latin name "Adam Theodrici" may be translated into English as "Adam of Theodoric," but art historians usually use the Dutch version of his name. Although it was rare in the 16th century for artists to sign a work when done, it usually took the "me fecit" (made me) form, in effect making the object speak.

Almost nothing is known about Dircksz except that the works were produced c. 1500–1530. The signature may indicate that he was a woodcutter, sculptor, medallist, or just simply the patron. Dircksz is thought to have been active between 1500 and 1530, and responsible for some sixty of the surviving examples. He may have led a workshop in the southern Netherlands, given that Flemish inscriptions appear on some of the carvings. Alternatively, it was located more northerly, possibly in the north of Brabant or at Delft in Holland. In any case, apart from Henry VIII and Catherine, all of the original owners come from the Netherlands.

Regardless of the number of works that Dircksz or his workshop can be attributed with, art historians often debate what the artistic and technical precedents for the miniatures might be. Scholten observes how, to a large extent, it seems "as if this exquisite sculpture was born ex nihilo around 1500", but points out that "giant strides are rarely made in art history," pointing to affinities with silversmith's art, especially the miniature architectural elements often found in ecclesiastical silver and ornaments.

== Iconography ==
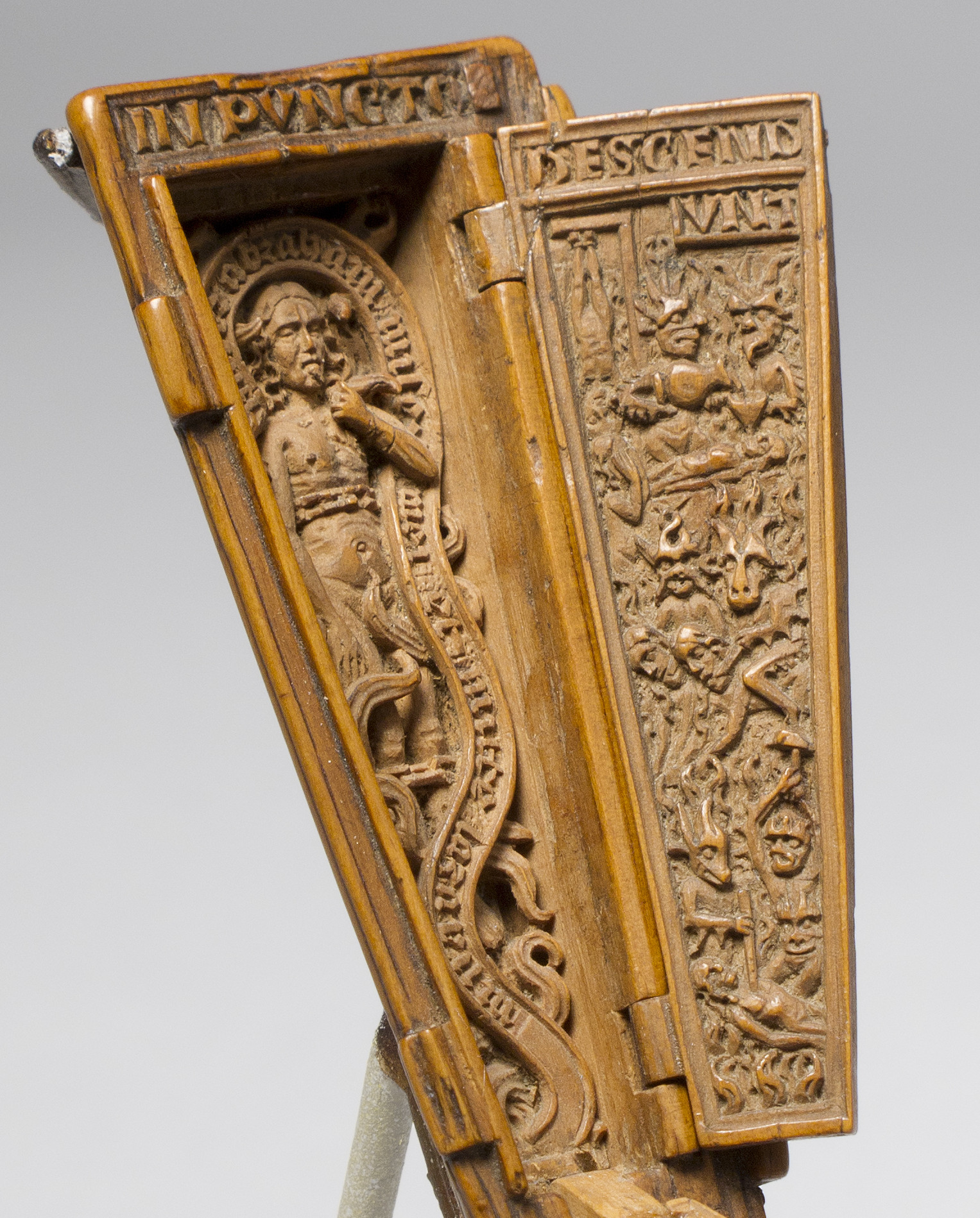
Miniature coffin or sarcophagus (1985.136). Netherlandish, c. 1500. Height: 10.1 cm (4.0 in). The Cloisters, New York.

Boxwood miniatures follow in the tradition of earlier Christian sculptures, including ivory diptychs, sculptures of the Virgin and Child, and relief carvings. They are similar in style to larger scale contemporary artworks, especially Flemish panel paintings, altarpieces, and sculpture, and they were conceived with similar religious outlook and conviction. Their iconography is often a mix of Old and New Testament scenes, with depictions of the Nativity and Passion being the most common. Although the central subject matter may be similar across many pieces, there are considerable differences in composition. Expansive depictions, such as of the Crucifixion, were sometimes influenced by contemporary literature. The objects' dramatic and incongruous impact, being both tiny and hugely expansive at the same time, are particularly suited to depictions of Heaven and Hell.

== Formats ==
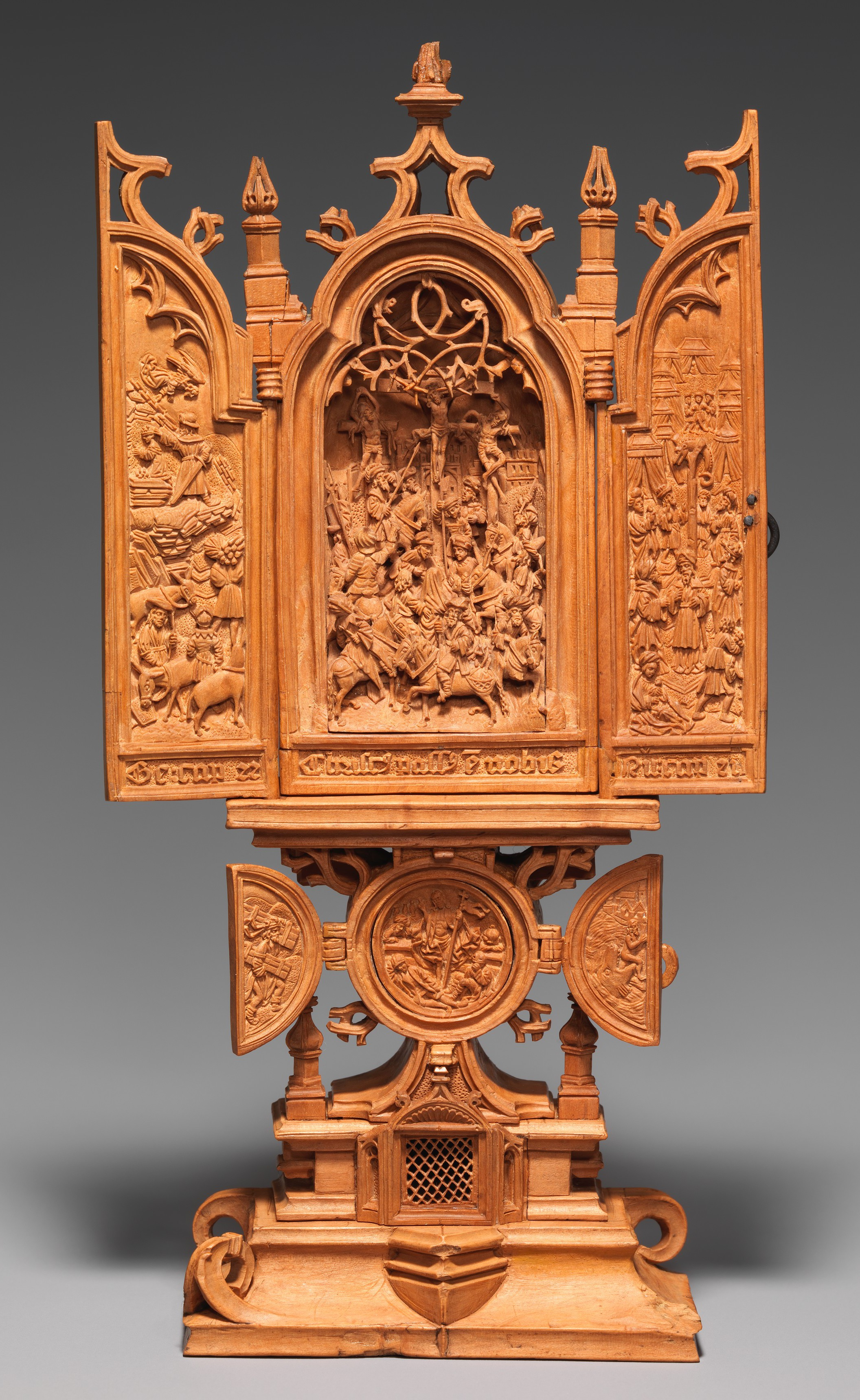
Miniature Altarpiece with the Crucifixion, early 16th century. Height: 15 cm (5.9 in). Metropolitan Museum of Art, New York.

The Metropolitan Museum of Art (MET) in New York broadly categorises the miniatures into two groups, those with simple reliefs and those with complex designs. Of the 150 surviving examples, most are single prayer beads, often with extravagant combinations of carving, Gothic tracery, and inscriptions on the outer shells. They often take the form of two hemispheres joined by a girdle with hinges and clasps, with the interiors hollowed out to accommodate the elaborate carvings. Apart from the more usual prayer nuts and polyptychs, other formats include statuettes, round pendants, coffins, and perfume flasks, and memento mori in the form of skulls (this latter format was also used for contemporary fruitwood carvings with equally dramatic and intense results).

Owing to the commonality of materials, production techniques, and the general absence of paint application, the miniatures had similar original colouring. This diverged over the centuries, given various storage and handling methods, as well as different restorations and coating applications. The tracery used for geometric decoration on the exteriors can be categorized into three different styles. One style superimposes intersecting circles around the head of the dome. A second uses small circles to punctuate and divide the dome into segments. The third style is a combination of the first two, but far more complex, and uses the arcs of the circles to link the first style's looping circles with the second style's repeating patterns. Yet all of the works are similar in proportion, circumference and the size of the hinge and clasps.

=== Prayer nuts ===
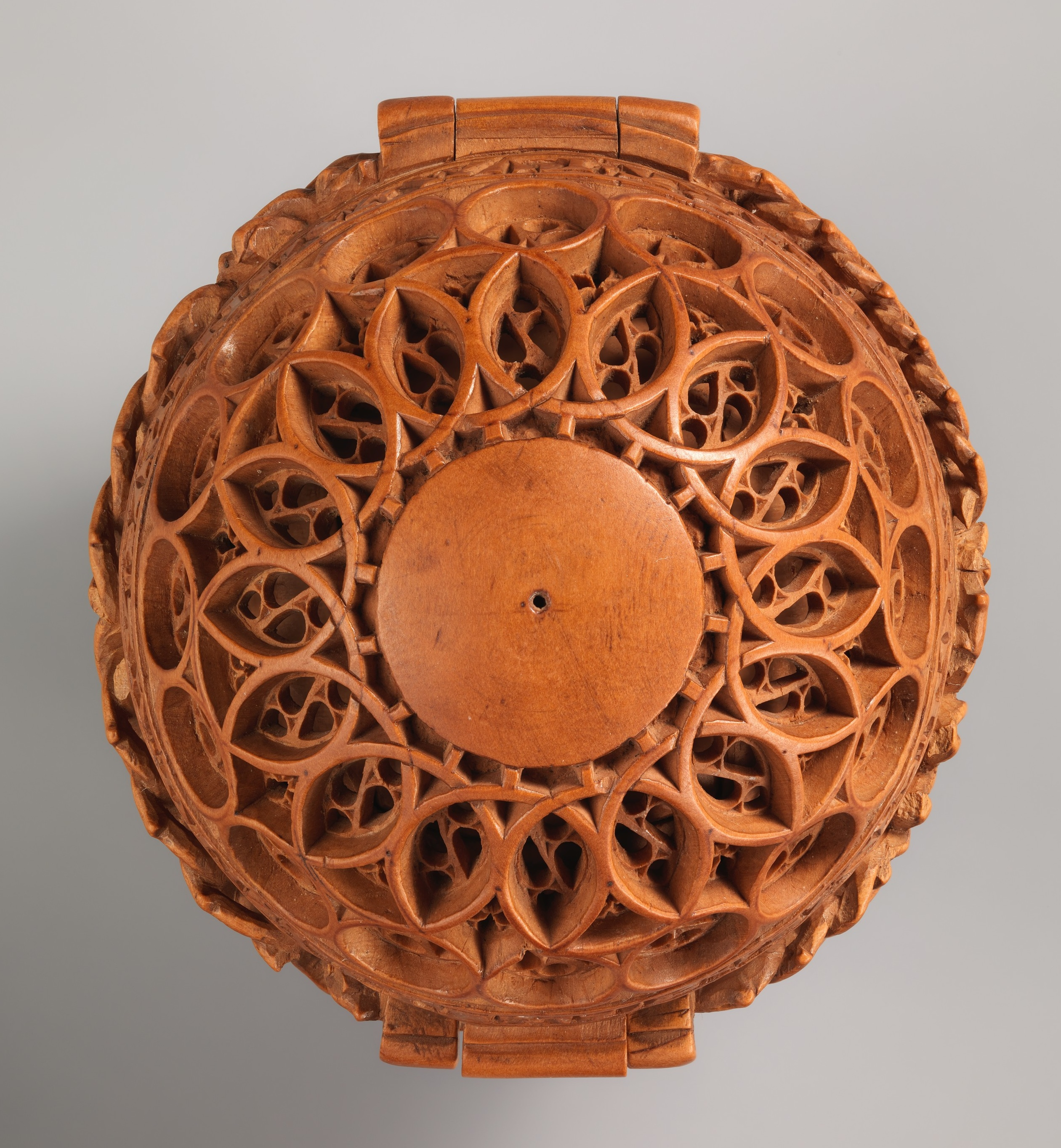
Half of a prayer bead with the Crucifixion (interior), Netherlandish, early 16th century. Height: 5.7 cm (2.2 in). Metropolitan Museum of Art, New York.

The English term "Prayer nut" comes from the equivalent Dutch word gebedsnoot, and took on common usage in the 18th century. The use of the word "nut" may be derived from the fact that some of the beads were actually carved from nuts or pits, and although no such miniatures are known to survive, it was a known practice in medieval southern Germany. They are mostly the same shape (deliberately designed to resemble apples), decorated with carved openwork Gothic tracery and flower heads, and of a size suitable for holding in the palm of a hand.

Prayer nuts often contain central scenes depicting episodes from the life of Mary or the Passion of Jesus. Some are a single bead; more rare are those consisting of up to eleven beads, including the "Chatsworth Rosary" given by Henry VIII to Catherine of Aragon, which is one of only two surviving boxwood rosaries. The figures are often dressed in fashionable contemporary clothing. The level of detail extends to the soldier's shields, their jacket buttons, jewelry, and candles. In some instances, they contain carved inscriptions usually related to the meaning of the narrative. There are more modest examples, such as the two medallions making up the "Half of a Prayer Bead with the Lamentation" (MS 17.190.458a, b) in the MET, which shows the Virgin and Child alongside a kneeling nun holding a string of beads, and a Pietà. The two images are unusually simple for the type; only a small portion of the available surface of the borders contain inscriptions.

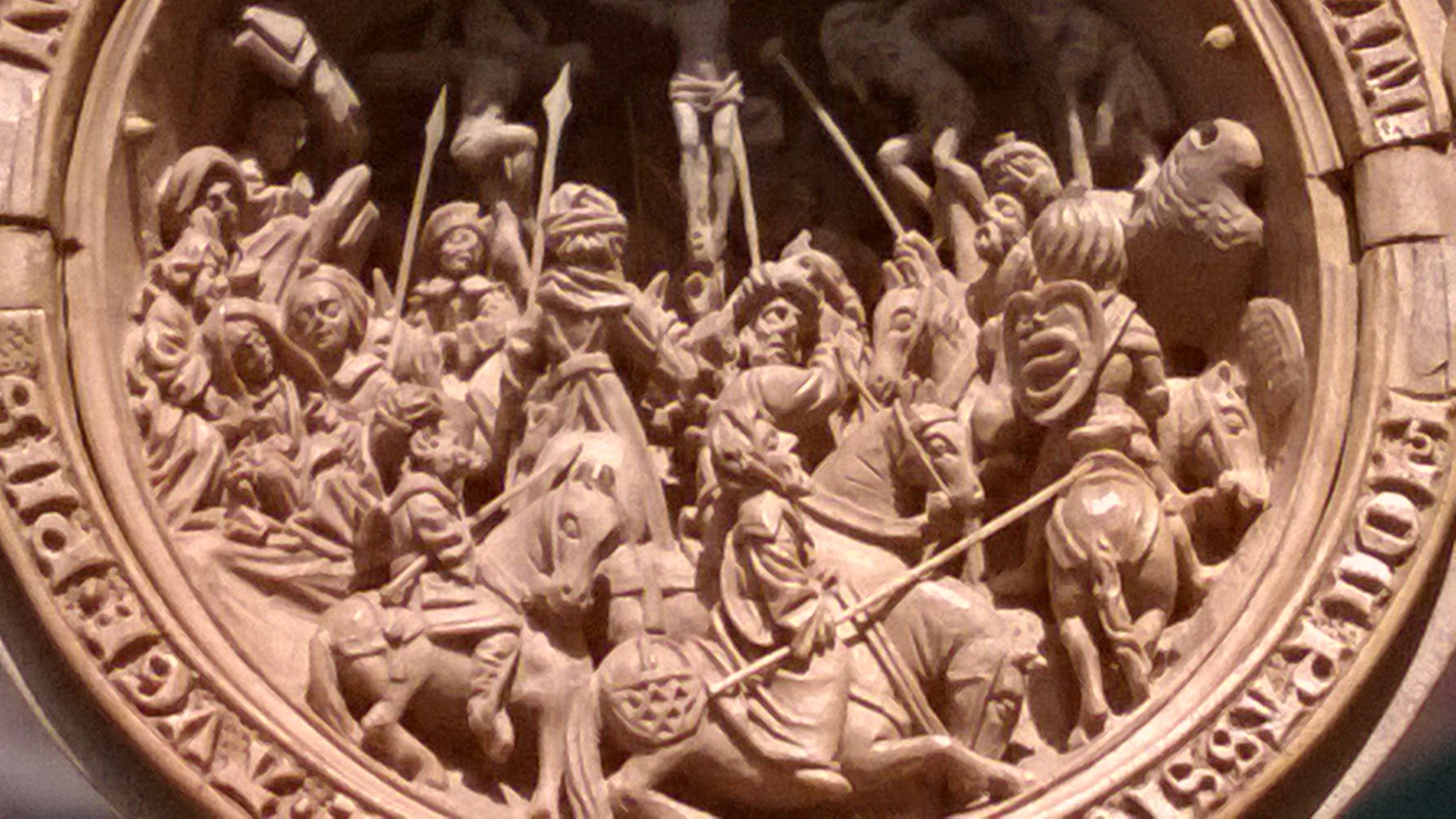
Prayer bead with the Crucifixion and Jesus before Pilate, interior view. Metropolitan Museum of Art, New York.

The beads are quite uniform in size and shape, with a diameter ranging from around 30 to 65 millimetres. Suda notes how their "spiritual impact ... [was] curiously ... in inverse proportion to their size." They were often made as two half-shells that could be opened to reveal intricate interior detail. According to the art historian Dora Thornton, when the prayer nut was opened out, it "revealed the representation of the divine hidden inside." The interiors range considerably in complexity and detail, with the more simple consisting of a low relief cut into a disc that has been rounded off at the back. At their most detailed and complex, Suda describes how the beads "played out like a grand opera on a miniature stage, complete with exotic costumes, elaborate props and animals large and small" and observes how they have an "Alice in Wonderland" quality, wherein "one tumbles headlong into the tiny world created by the carver ... into the world they reveal beyond one's immediate surroundings."

Scholten notes that the tracery may have been intended to suggest that the object contained a small relic, "so that the object took on the character of a talisman and was deemed to have an apotropaic effect." A number contain a wooden loop in the middle of one half so they could be worn hanging from a belt, or carried in a case. A fragrant substance was sometimes placed inside the shell, which diffused when the beads were opened, making them comparable to the then fashionable pomanders.

The shape of a prayer nut likely carried deep significance; with the outer sheath representing Christ's human flesh; the bead stand, his cross; and the interior reliefs, his divinity. According to Thornton, "unfolding the nut is in itself an act of prayer, like opening up a personal illuminated prayer book, or watching the leaves of a large-scale altarpiece being hinged back in a church service". However, Scholten questions their use for private religious devotion, noting how their diminutive scale made them impractical for meditation, as their imagery was not discernible without a magnifying glass or strong spectacles.

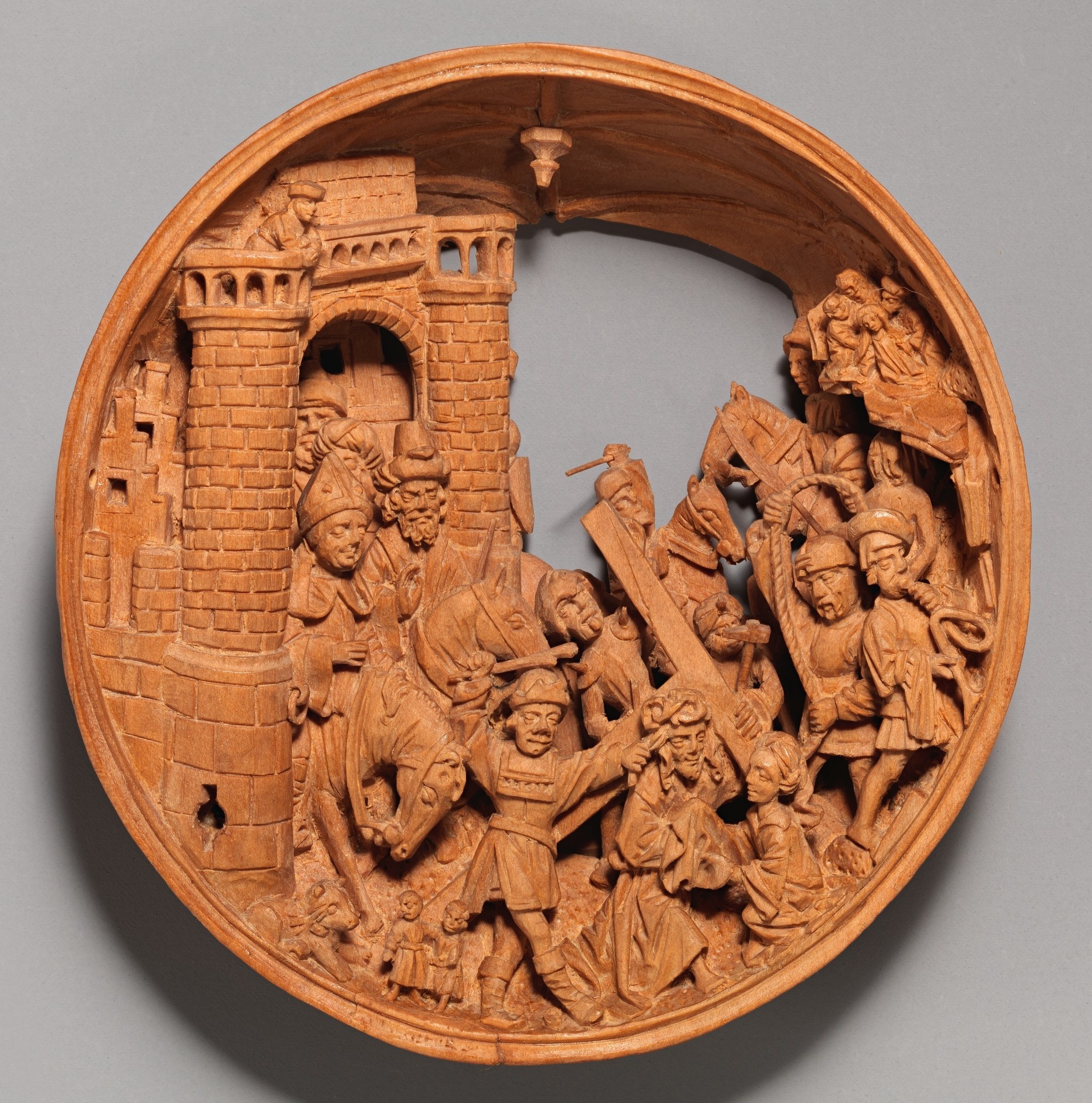
Half of a prayer bead with Jesus carrying the Cross, interior view. Metropolitan Museum of Art, New York.

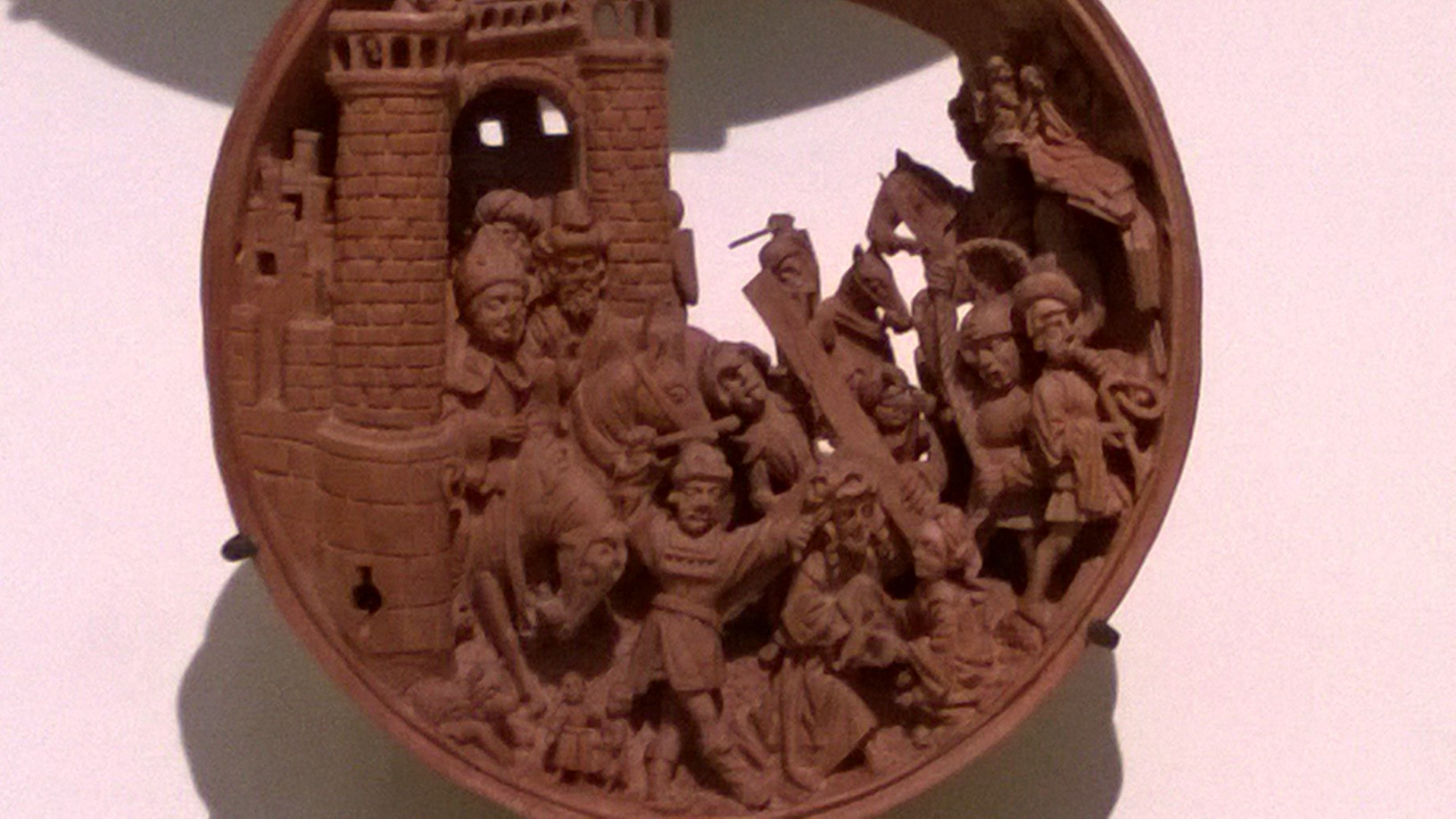
Prayer bead with the Crucifixion and Jesus before Pilate, interior view. Metropolitan Museum of Art, New York.

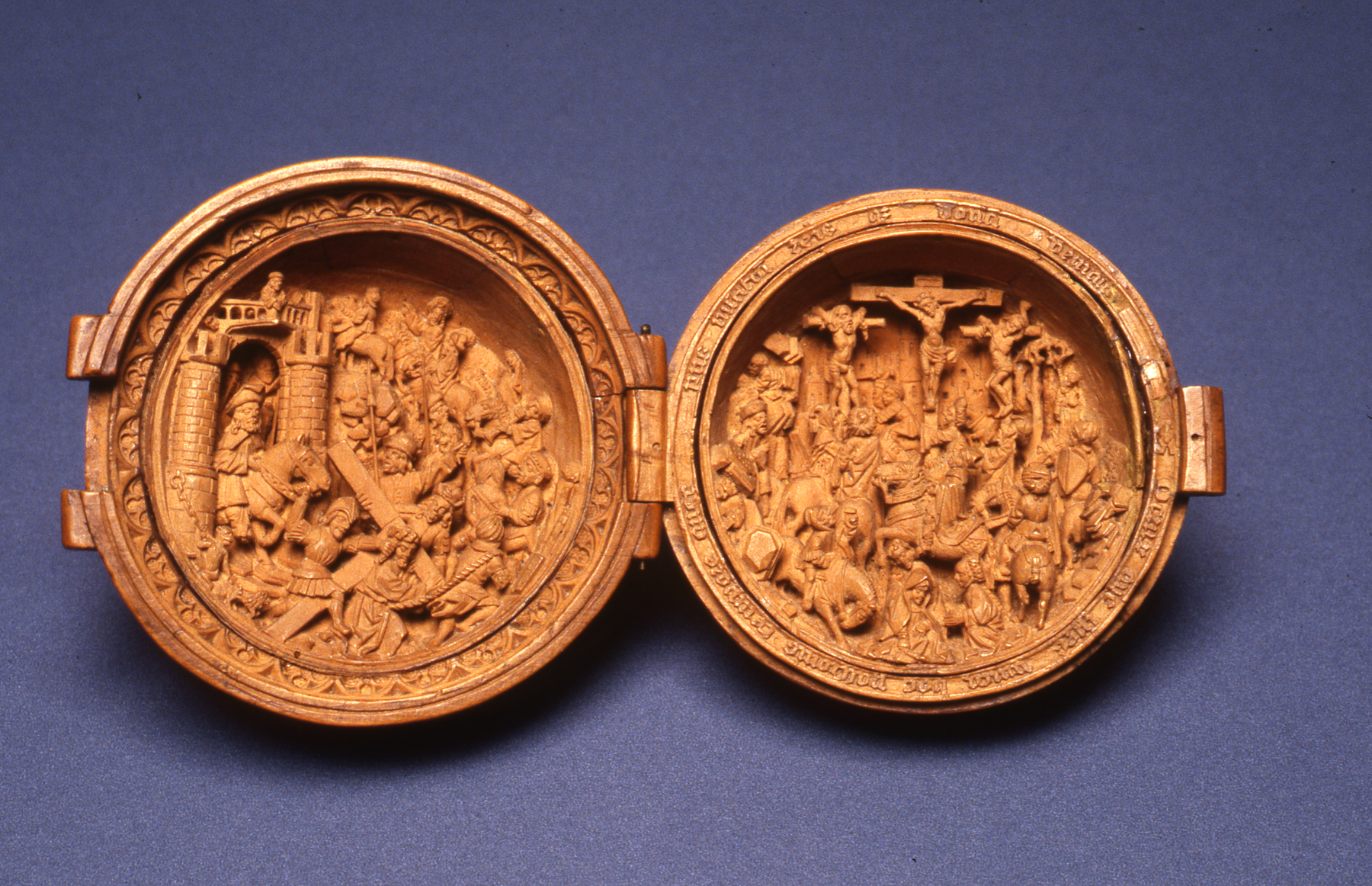
Rosary bead with scene of Christ carrying the Cross, c. 1500–1525. Walters Art Museum, Baltimore.

=== Polyptychs ===
Miniature boxwood polyptychs are typically altarpieces, with tabernacles and monstrances more rare. These multi-paneled works exist in both horizontal and landscape format. The polyptychs served as portable devices for laypersons for use in private devotion. Their popularity reflects the growing merchant class living in the major northern European port cities. Their iconography often follows contemporary larger scale panel altarpieces, with depictions of Christ carrying the Cross, and the Entry into Jerusalem as common subjects. The altarpieces typically consist of three major elements; an architectural housing, interior reliefs, and a base or predella which could be fixed or detachable. In turn, each of these elements may have several components, which were either pinned or bound with glue. They usually contain folding wings, carved in low relief, with smaller figures and scenes around the borders of the central pictorial space. Typically, the larger fixed elements were built from a single block of wood, with the connected components connected by interlocking mortise and tenon joins cut into the slabs.

A triptych altarpiece (MMA 17.190.453) in the MET has a compartment (receptacle) for holding relics that is covered by a hinged disc. An especially detailed and complex 25.1 cm (9.9 in) high triptych catalogued as WB.232 in the British Museum, credited to the workshop of Dircksz, contains two triptychs on upper and lower registers. The upper, far larger register consists of a central panel with a background Crucifixion and numerous foreground figures; a Resurrection, Entombment, and other scenes are on the right-hand wing, while depictions of Christ Carrying the Cross and the Sacrifice of Isaac are the main features of the left wing.

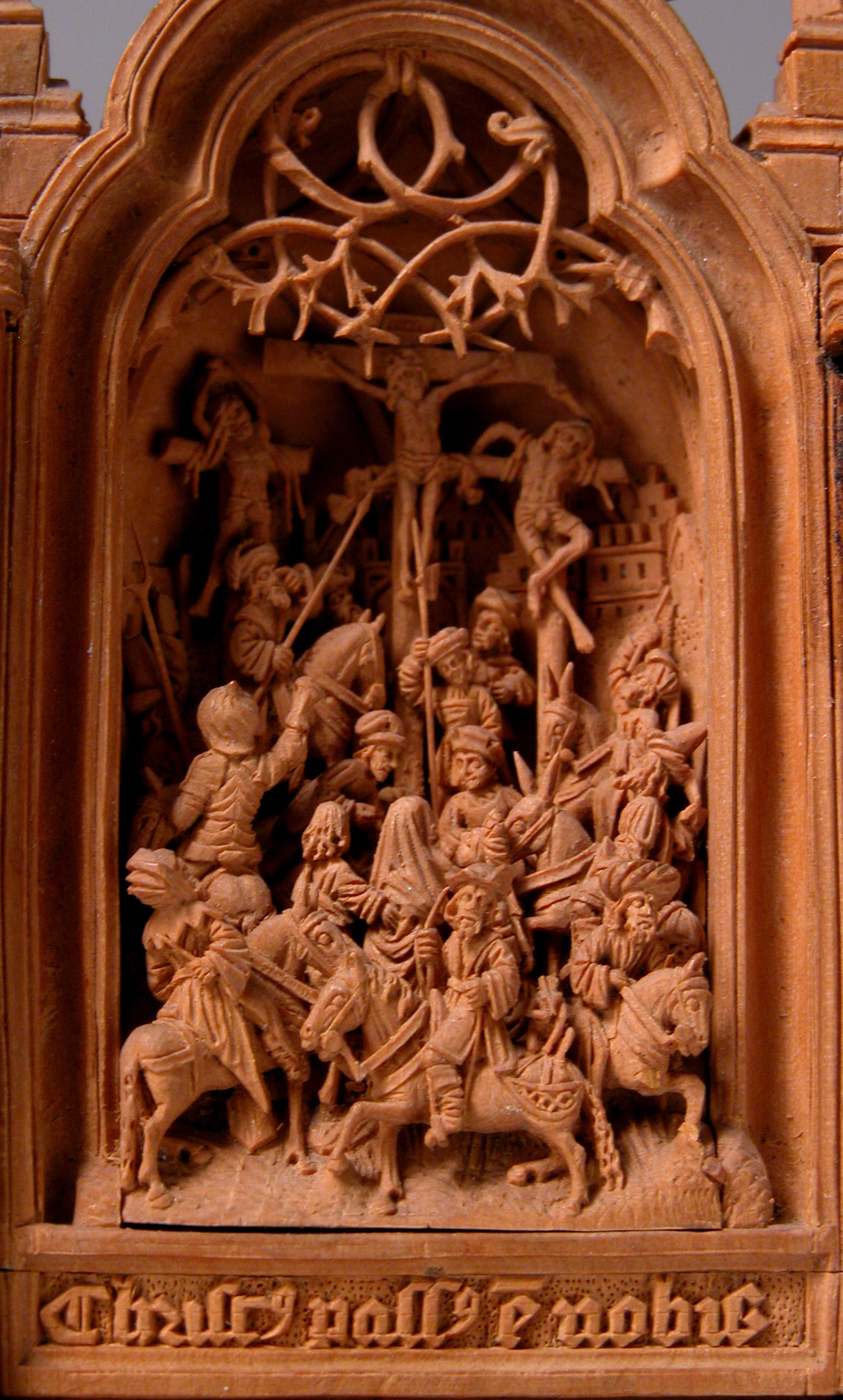
Miniature altarpiece with the Crucifixion (detail), early 16th century. Height: 15 cm (5.9 in). The Cloisters, New York.

The reliefs are usually positioned on a horizontal plane, allowing a long space between the tops of the figures and the ends of rounded overhead arches. The carving is usually quite shallow, with just enough depth in the niches to position the figures, which can be either free-standing or carved into the main block high relief. Many of the more elaborate and detailed carvings, including landscape elements, were created separately and then inserted; in these instances the tight space did not allow them to be carved in the main block of wood.

Many of the miniatures contain elements of contemporary Northern Gothic style architecture. An example in the British Museum has an Italian Renaissance influence, evident in its baluster shafts and the prophets on the pilasters on either side of the Crucifixion. The late 15th-century veneration for the Passion of Jesus and the Sorrows of Mary had a strong bearing on their design. Part of the appeal of the Passion was the contrast between relatively simple scenes from the Life of Christ juxtaposed against more complex scenes with detailed vistas, such as the Crucifixion or depictions of Heaven and Hell.

== Collections ==
Boxwood miniatures seem to have served three original functions: aids to private devotion, luxury objects of status, and novel playthings. Later, they became family heirlooms passed from generation to generation, but as medieval art fell out of fashion in the early modern period, their provenance was often lost. The earliest record of a collection is the 1598 inventory of the dukes of Bavaria, which contained several examples.

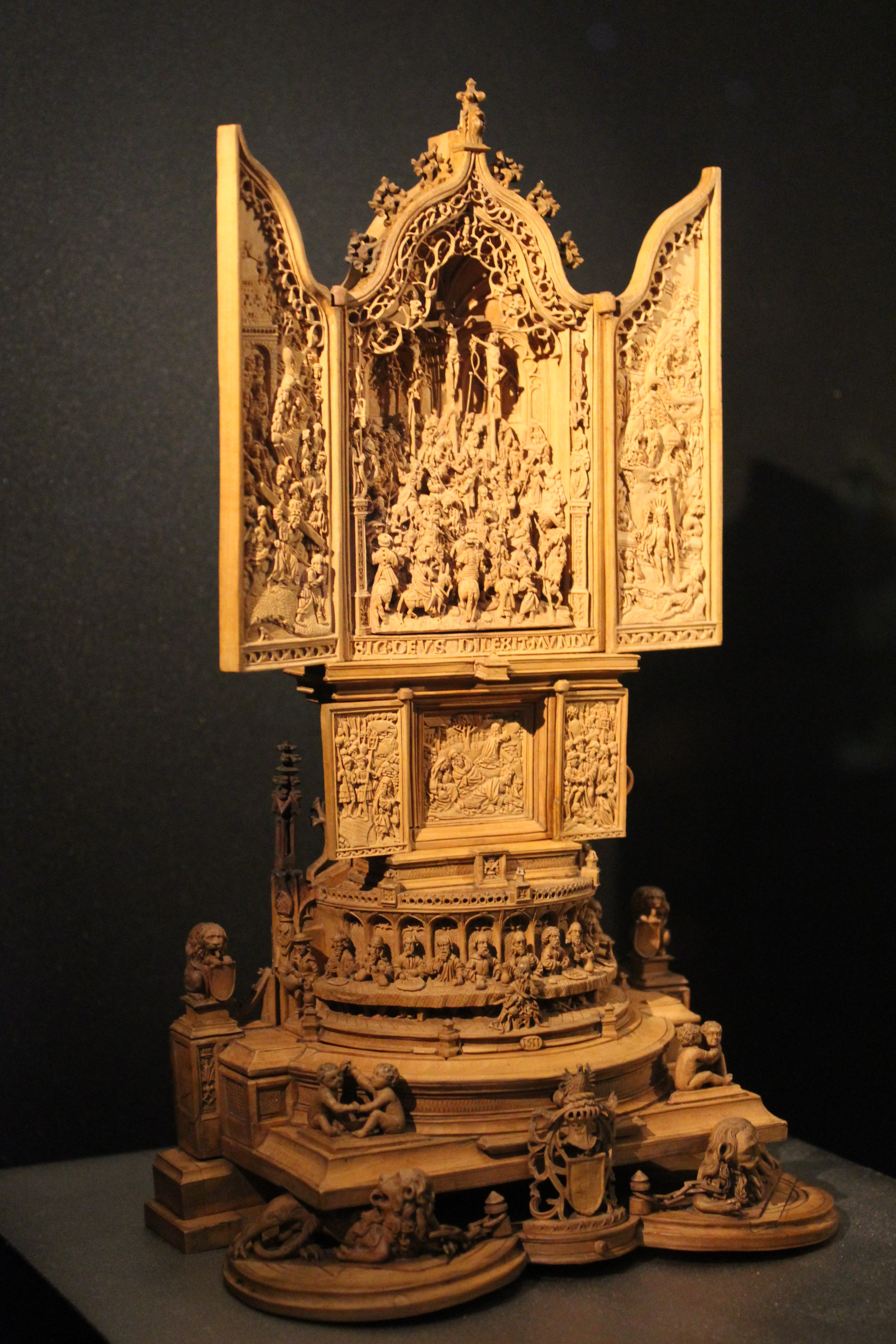
Miniature altarpiece (WB.232), Dircksz and workshop, 1511, British Museum, London

Of the surviving works, over one hundred re-emerged in the 19th century Parisian antiquarian market, then the leading market for medieval art. During this period, they were acquired by people such as the British collector Richard Wallace (1818–1890), who purchased Count van Nieuwerkerke's (1811–1892) entire collection, including two boxwood prayer nuts, the Vienna-born collector of objets d'art Frédéric Spitzer (1815–1890), and Ferdinand de Rothschild (1839–1898). Spitzer was not a purist and commissioned metalsmiths to produce modern versions or copies of a variety of medieval artworks. Today, there are four surviving boxwood carvings he had augmented for the market.

When the American financier J. P. Morgan purchased Baron Albert Oppenheim's collection in 1906, he acquired four boxwood miniatures, including a triptych with the Crucifixion and Resurrection, and a prayer nut showing the Carrying of the Cross, all of which are now in the MET. The Canadian publishing magnate Kenneth Thomson, was an important collector for over 50 years, and his collection included the world's largest gathering of boxwood miniatures, including two skulls, two triptychs, and six prayer beads. These were bequeathed to the Art Gallery of Ontario, along with three other works collected by his family after his death.

== Study and conservation ==
Objects of this scale are difficult to view with the naked eye, and, even when held in hand, the true level of intricacy is not easily recognized. The difficulty of producing magnified reproductions contributes to the fact that there has been comparatively little research into the format. Even traditional photography can fail to convey the true level of detail. Meaningful reproduction can only be achieved by computer modeling, where a series of photographs at various focal depths are stacked to attain consistent sharpness.

Modern imaging technology has greatly improved the study of the objects since the late 20th century, including the use of X-ray. Micro-CT scanning, using technology similar to medical scanning, allows the capture of thousands of images, which can then be assembled into a three-dimensional model.

== Examples ==
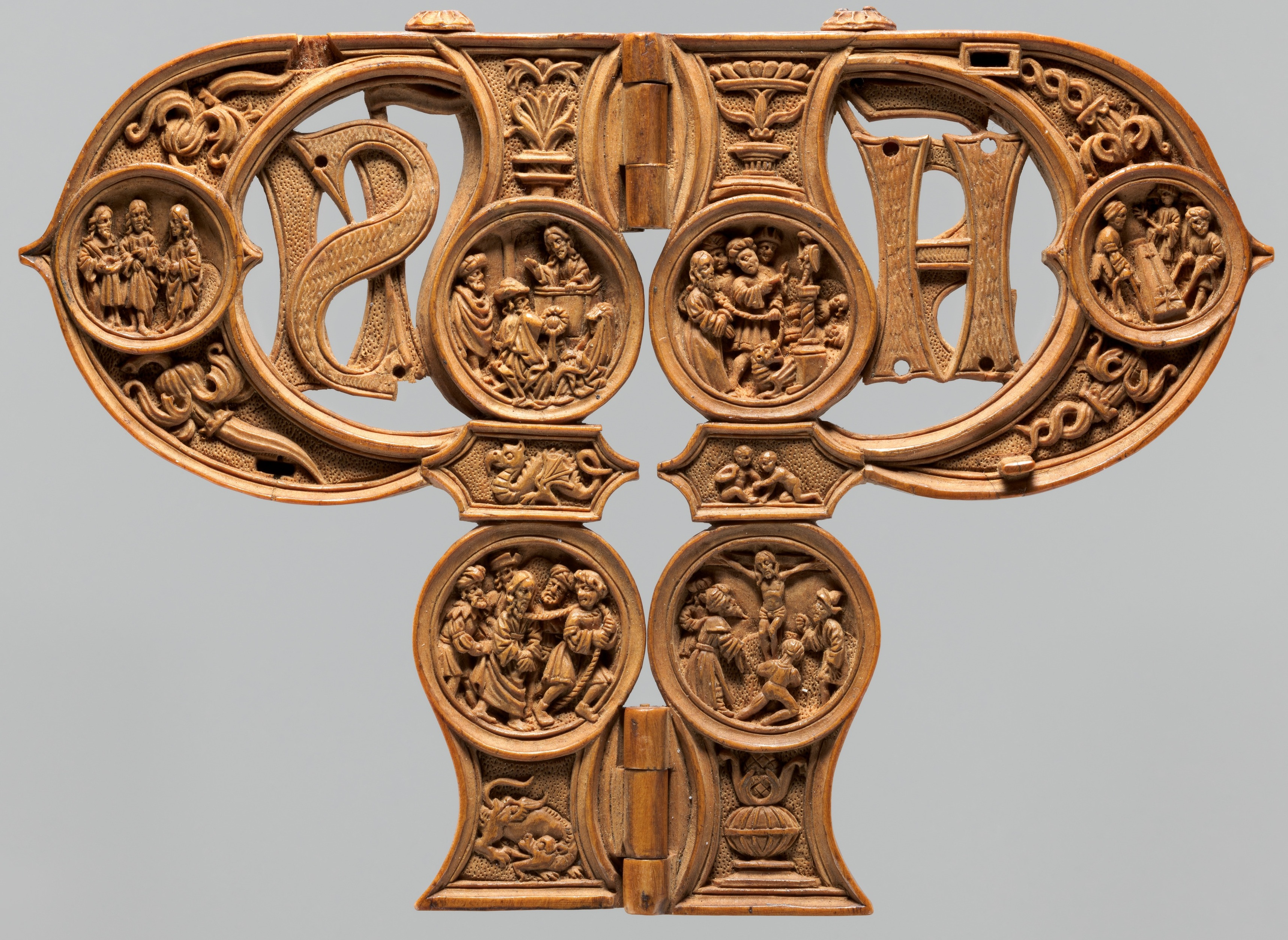
Letter P with the Legend of Saint Philip, Netherlandish, 1500–1506. Height (open): 7.1 cm (2.8 in). The Cloisters, New York.

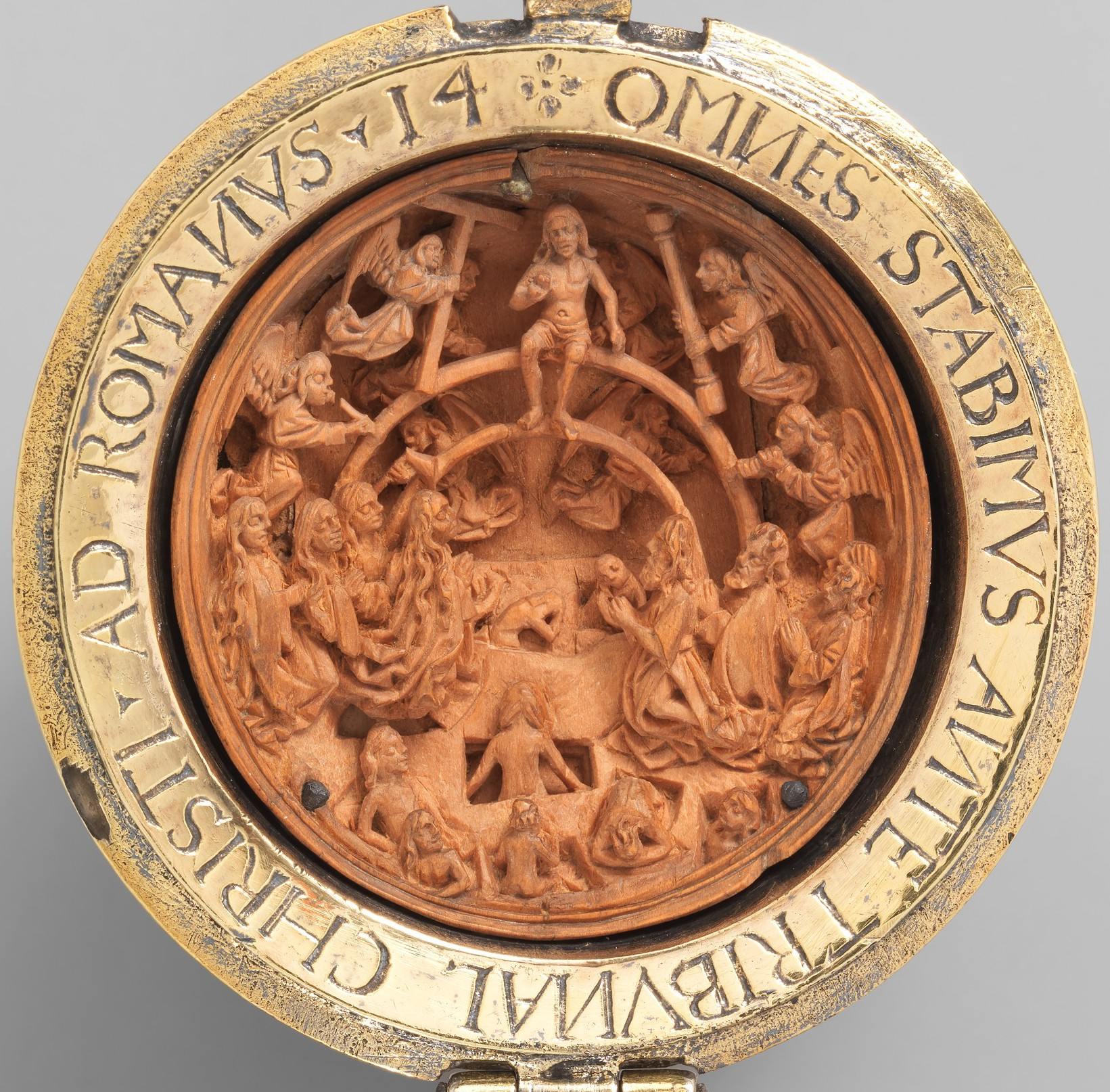
Prayer nut (CA 17.190.328), Flemish, c. 1525–1550. Height: 8.7 cm (3.4 in). Metropolitan Museum of Art, New York.

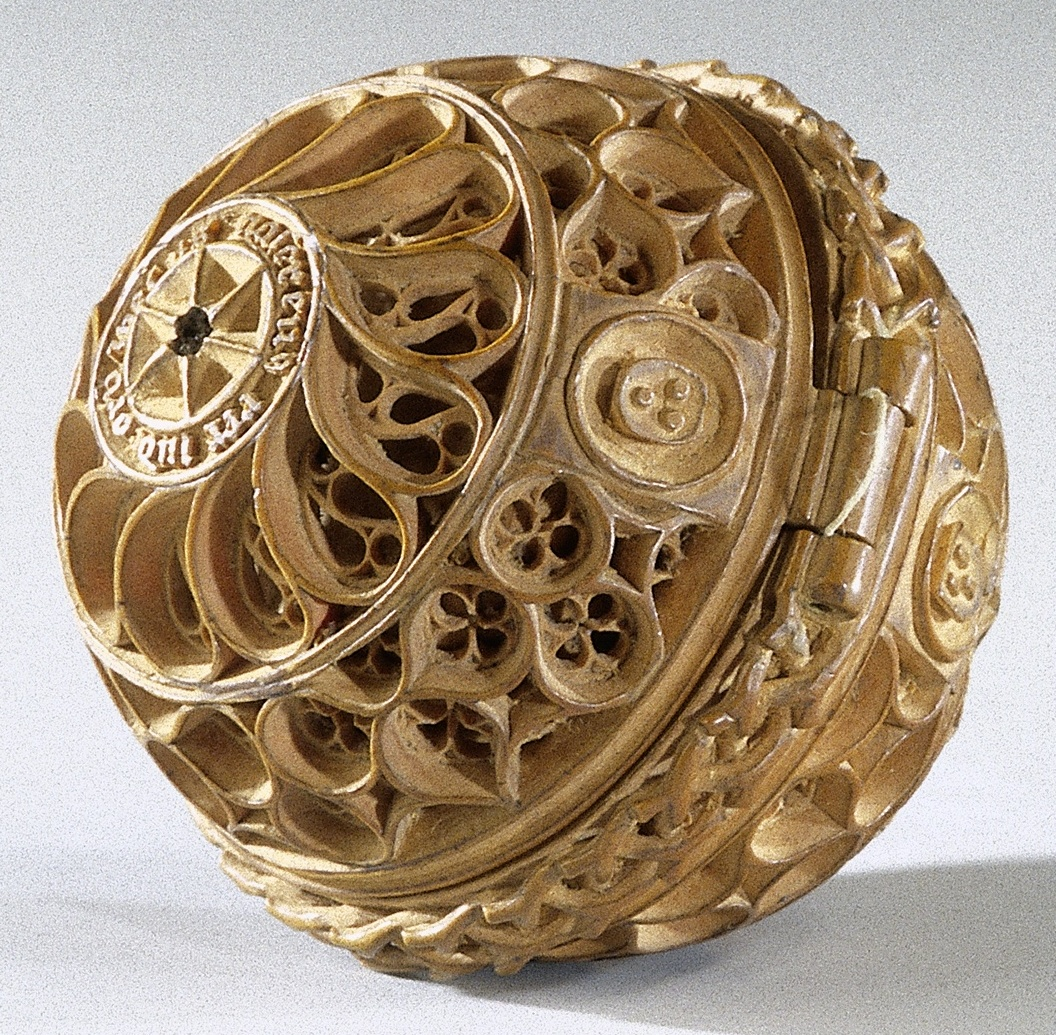
Prayer nut case with tracery, attributed to Dircksz, c. 1500–1530. Rijksmuseum, Amsterdam.
