= Frits Scholten =

Dutch art historian

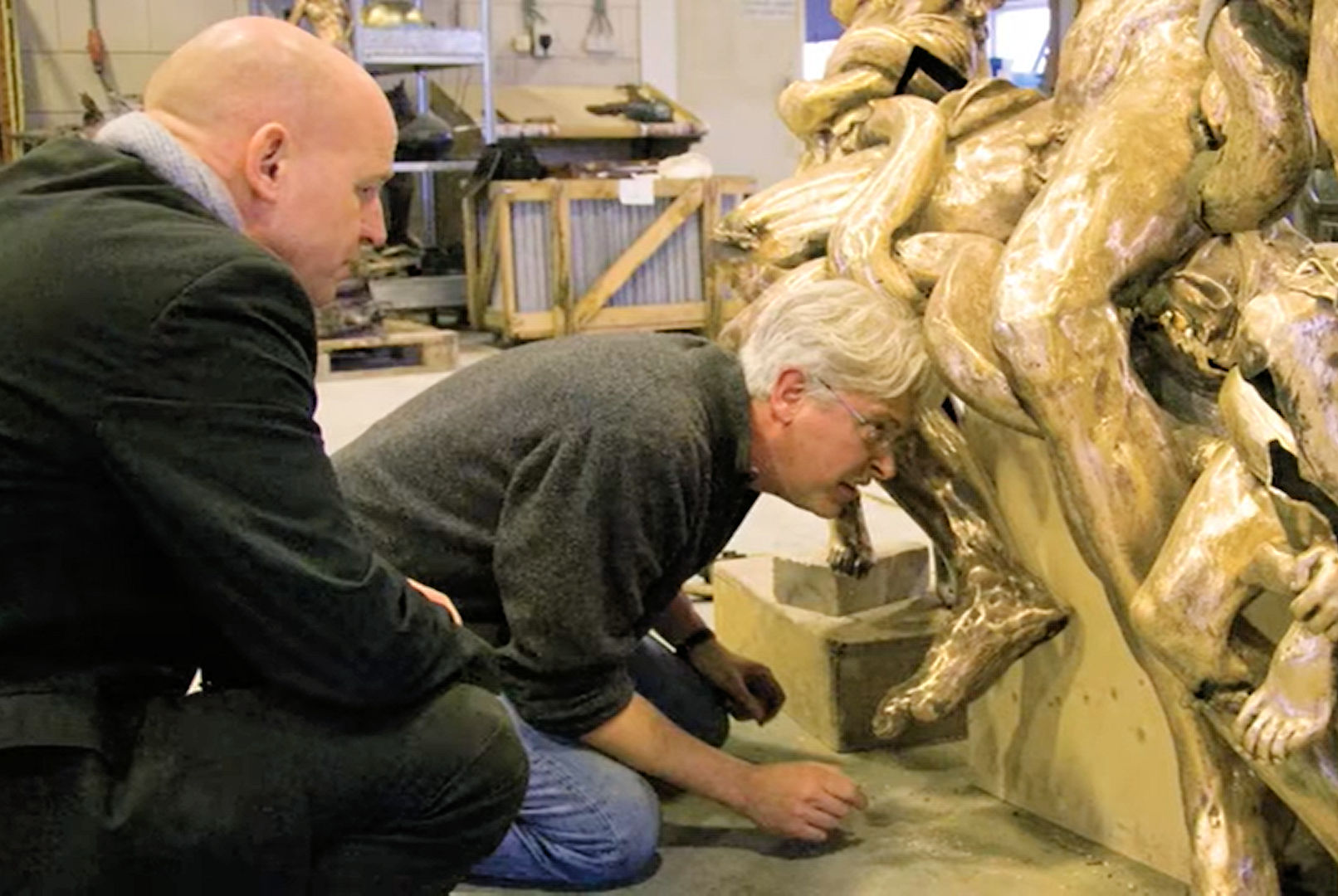
Frits Scholten (left) and artist Willem Noyons.

Frits Scholten (born 1959 in Hengelo, Netherlands) is a Dutch art historian specialising in art of the Netherlands from the late Middle Ages until 1800, and sculpture from the 15th to 19th centuries. Currently he is Head of Department of Sculpture and the Rijksmuseum in Amsterdam. Previously he was senior curator of sculpture at the Rijksmuseum from 1993, prior to which he worked at the Gemeentemuseum Den Haag. Scholten has published extensively on applied arts and European sculpture. He is editor of the Nederlands Kunsthistorisch Jaarboek and the Wallraf-Richartz Museum Jahrbuch.

== Publications ==
- "Adriaen de Vries: The Bacchant and Other Late Works". Rijksmuseum, 2017. ISBN 978-9-4917-1485-6
- "Small Wonders: Late Gothic Boxwood Microcarvings from the Low Countries". Rijksmuseum, 2017. ISBN 978-9-4917-1493-1
- "Judith Pfaeltzer: The Sculpture as Landscape". Waanders Uitgevers, 2008. ISBN 978-9-0400-8387-7
- "Menacing Love: A Statue by Falconet". Waanders Uitgevers, 2006. ISBN 978-9-0400-9133-9
- "Willem Van Tetrode Sculptor". Rijksmuseum, 2003. ISBN 978-9-0400-8781-3
- "Adriaen de Vries, imperial sculptor". Exhibition Catalogue, 1998–99, Amsterdam (Rijksmuseum), Stockholm (Nationalmuseum) and Los Angeles (J. Paul Getty Museum)
