= Adam and Eve (disambiguation) =

Adam and Eve are figures in the Abrahamic religions.

Adam and Eve may also refer to:

== Arts and entertainment ==
=== Film and television ===
- Adam and Eve (1923 film), a German silent film directed by Friedrich Porges and Reinhold Schünzel
- Adam and Eve (1928 film), a German silent film directed by Rudolf Biebrach
- Adam and Eve (1949 film), an Italian film
- Adam and Eve (1953 film), a Danish film
- Adam and Eve (1969 film), a Soviet comedy film
- National Lampoon's Adam & Eve, a 2005 American film
- Eva & Adam (TV series), a Swedish drama series based on the comics
- "Adam & Eve", episodic narrative in the 1992 Indian TV series Bible Ki Kahaniyan

=== Literature and theatre ===
- Eve & Adam, a 2012 novel by Michael Grant and Katherine Applegate
- Eva & Adam, a Swedish comics series by Johan Unenge and Måns Gahrton
- Adam şi Eva, a 1925 novel by Liviu Rebreanu
- Adam and Eve (manga), 2015–2016
- Adam and Eve (play), by Mikhail Bulgakov, 1931

=== Music ===
- Adam & Eve (duo), a 1970s German schlager duo
- Adam and Eve (Catherine Wheel album), 1997
- Adam & Eve (The Flower Kings album), or the title song, 2004
- "Adam & Eve (song)", by Kasey Chambers and Shane Nicholson, 2012
- "Adam and Eve", a song by Nas from the 2018 album Nasir
- Adam 'n' Eve, an album from Gavin Friday
- "Adán y Eva", a 2018 song by Paulo Londra

=== Visual arts ===
- Adam and Eve (Baldung), a pair of paintings
- Adam and Eve (Cranach), several paintings by Lucas Cranach the Elder
- Adam and Eve (Dürer), two works
- Adam and Eve (Rodin), a 1905 marble sculpture
- Adam and Eve (Tintoretto), two paintings
- Adam and Eve (Valadon), a 1909 painting
- Adam and Eve (Tamara de Lempicka), a 1932 panel painting
- Adam and Eve/Gideon and the Fleece, two paintings by Maarten van Heemskerck

== Buildings ==
- Adam & Eve, Birmingham, a former public house in Birmingham, England
- Adam and Eve, Norwich, a pub in Norwich, England

== Businesses ==
- Adam & Eve (company), an American company that sells adult products
- Adam + Eve, a clothing line designed by Adam Lippes

== Plants ==
- Adam and Eve, a common name for the plant Arum maculatum
- Adam and Eve, a common name for the orchid, Aplectrum hyemale

== Other uses ==
- "Adam and Eve", rhyming slang for "believe"
- Y-chromosomal Adam and Mitochondrial Eve
- Siôn a Siân ('Adam and Eve'), the twin monoliths at the summit of the mountain Tryfan in Wales
- Church of the Immaculate Conception, Dublin, Ireland, nicknamed "Adam and Eve's"
- HMS Adam & Eve, the name of two Royal Navy ships

== See also ==
- Adam and Eve and Pinch Me (disambiguation)
- Adam and Eve in Mormonism
- Adam and Eve cylinder seal
- Adam and Evil (disambiguation)
- El pecado de Adán y Eva, a 1969 Mexican film
