= Prayer bead with the Adoration of the Magi and the Crucifixion =

Small south Netherlandish prayer nut

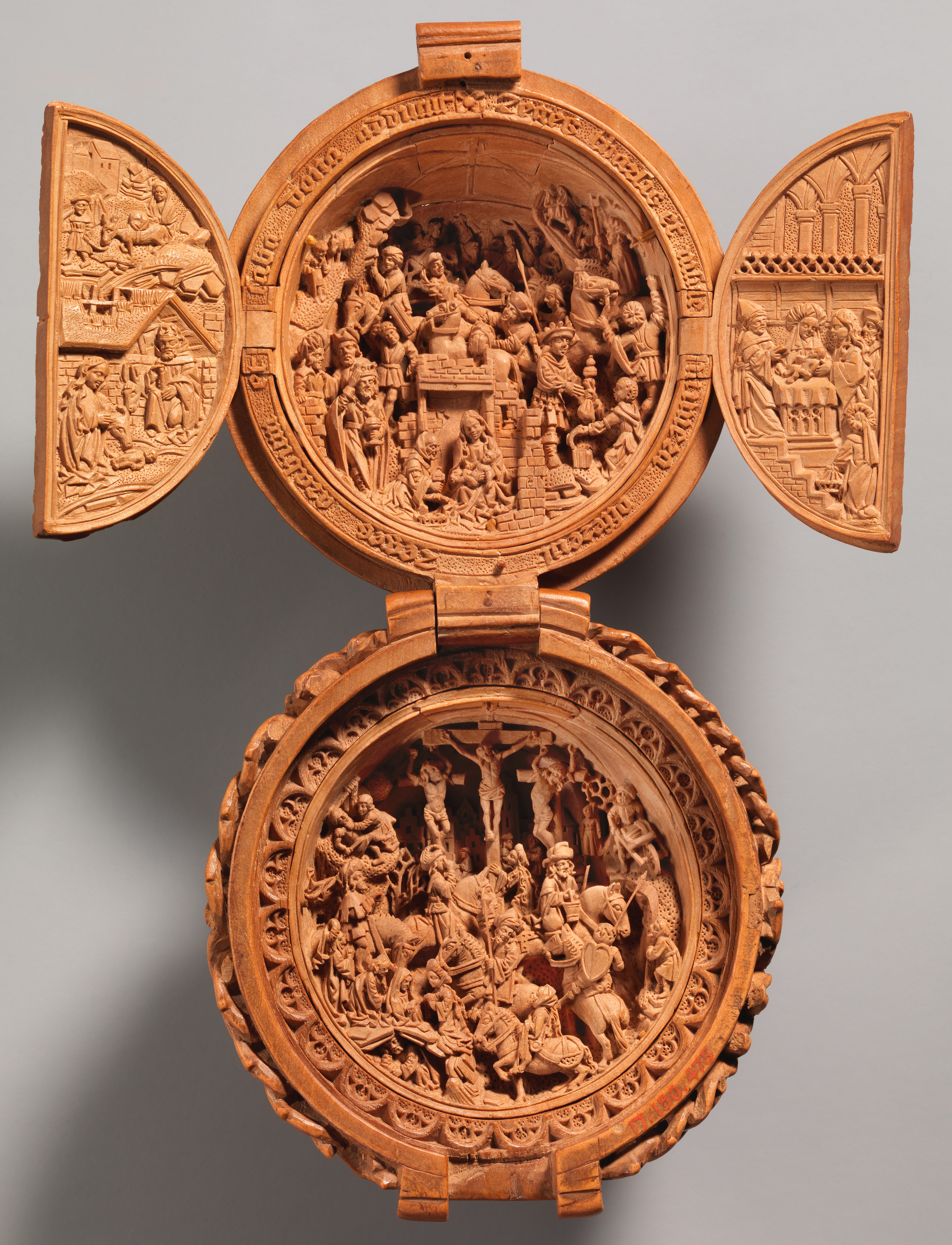
South Netherlandish, boxwood, 5.2 cm (2.0 in), 1500–1510

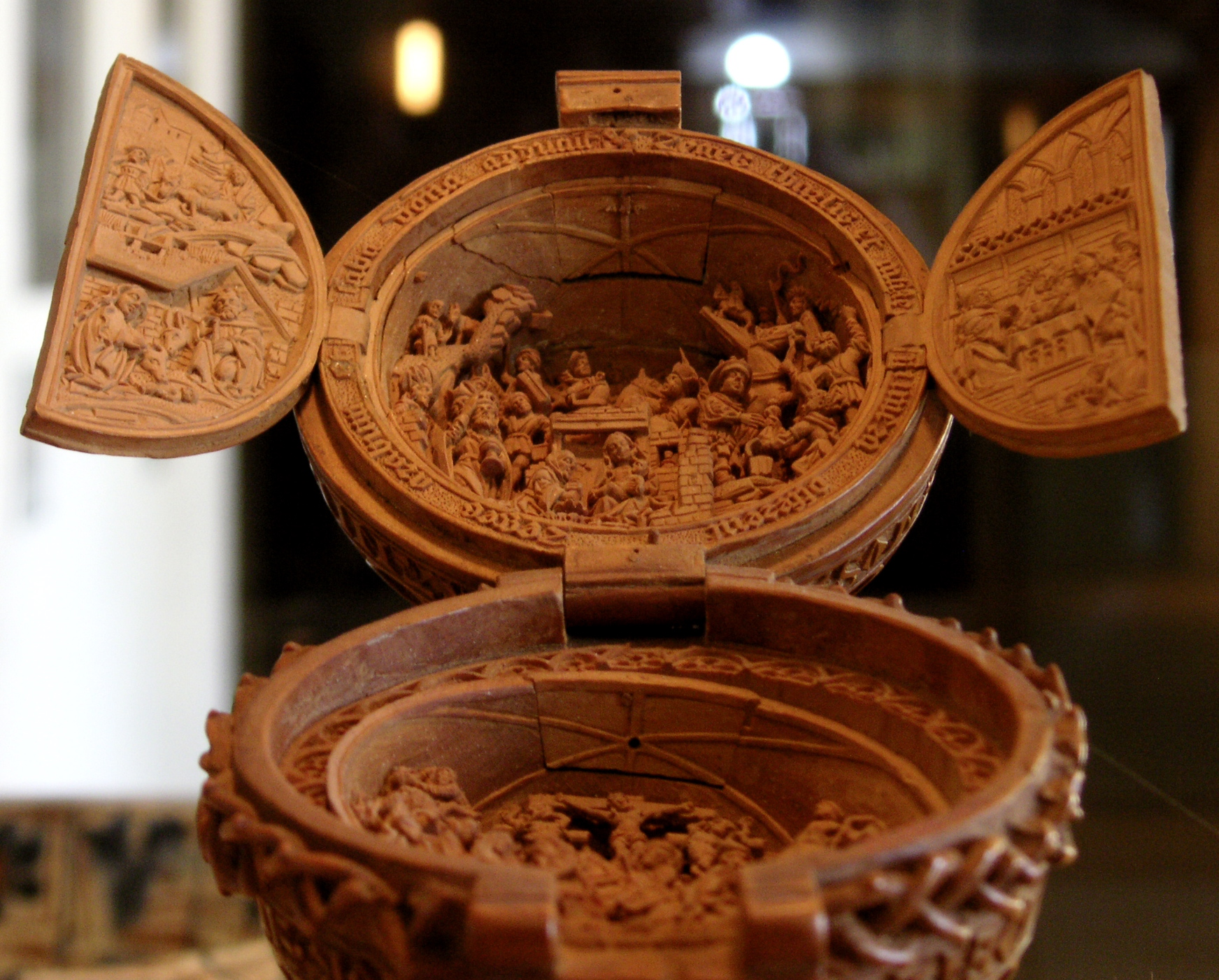
Detail

Prayer bead with the Adoration of the Magi and the Crucifixion (MS 17.190.475) is a very small south Netherlandish prayer nut, carved in fine-grained boxwood.

The beads are dated to c. 1500–1510 and are in the collection of The Cloisters, New York.

== Description ==
The bead would have been part of a complete rosary set, and its size suggests its use as an Ave bead, where the supplicant would recite the "Hail Mary". Objects of this type were in great demand in the early sixteenth century. Apart from use in private veneration, they could be worn as necklaces or hung from belts as fashionable accessories. The exceptional craftsmanship of this example indicates that it was intended for a member of the high nobility. J. P. Morgan donated the bead to the Metropolitan Museum of Art in 1917.

The Cloisters bead consists of two surviving capsules, each consisting of a series of minutely detailed carvings on both sides. Latin inscriptions, some in Gothic script, frame the work. The upper capsule has two wings, which when opened form a triptych. These three panels show the journey to Nazareth and the nativity on the left wing, with the Adoration of the Magi, complete with horses and camels, and the Presentation and the Offering of Doves (Leviticus 14:22) on the right.

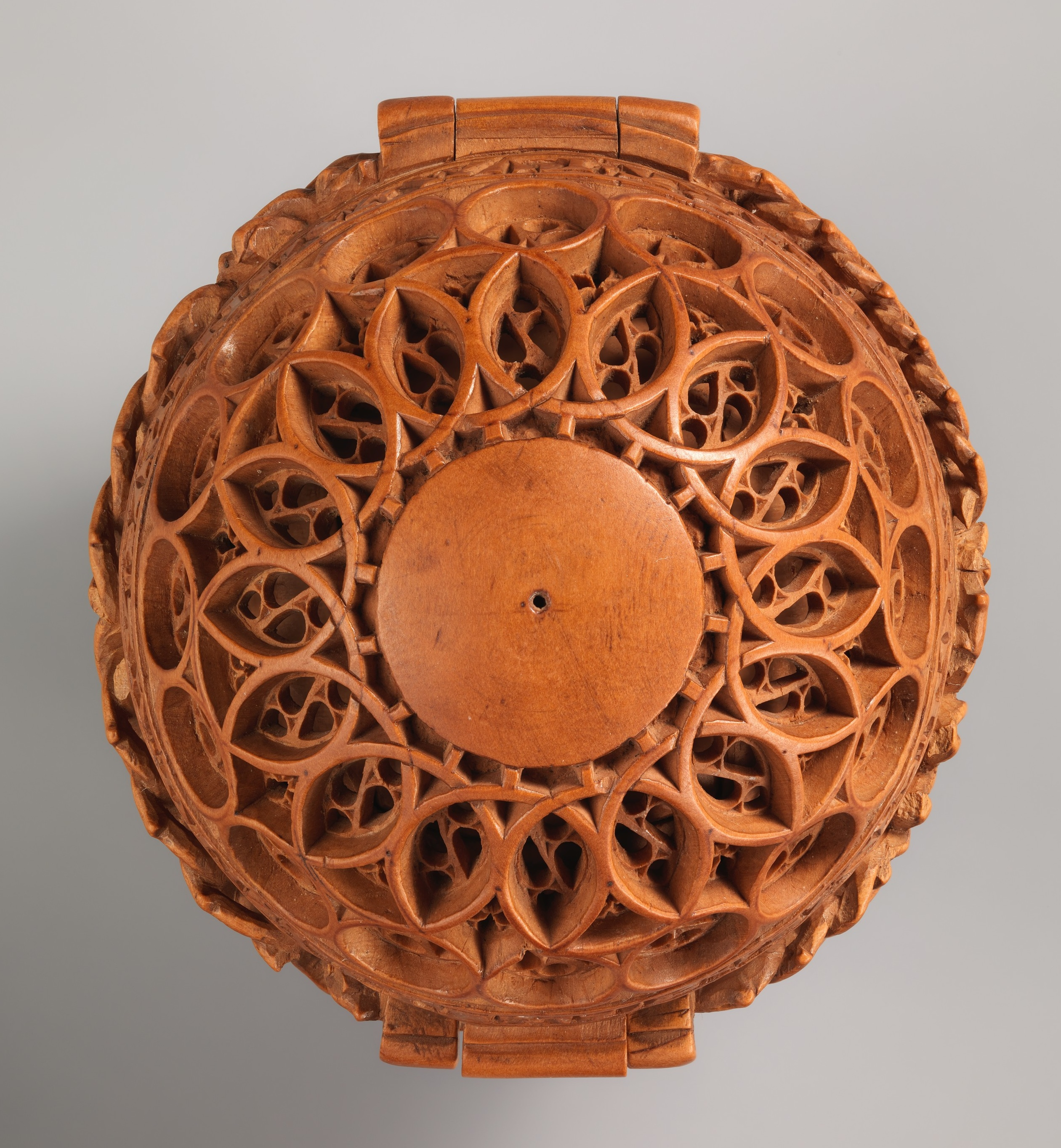
Closed view

Adam and Eve and the tree of knowledge are detailed on the outside of the wings. The use of boxwood, with its regular dense grain, allowed craftsmen to create highly detailed miniature carvings, usually with the aid of a steady hand and a magnifying glass.

The lower half is dominated by the Crucifixion of Jesus, while also showing the Agony in the Garden and Saint Peter severing the ear of Malchus with his sword. Other carvings include the crown of thorns and Gothic arches. Inscriptions on the exterior are taken from the Book of Lamentations 3:41 and 1:12 and read Levemus corda nostra cum manibus ad dnm in ce and Attendite (et) videte si est dolor sicut dolor meu. Those on the upper half of the interior are from Psalm 71 and use Gothic lettering, reading Reges Tharsis et insile munera offerent reges Arabum et Saba dona adducent.

== Sources ==
- Ellis, Lisa; Suda, Alexandra. "Small Wonders: Gothic Boxwood Miniatures". Art Gallery of Ontario, 2016. ISBN 978-1-8942-4390-2
- McConnell, Sophie. "Metropolitan Jewelry". New York: Metropolitan Museum of Art, 1991
- Williamson, G.C. "Catalog of the Collections of Jewels and Precious Works of Art: The Property of J. Pierpont Morgan". London: Chiswick Press, 1910
- Wixom, William. "Medieval Sculpture at The Cloisters". The Metropolitan Museum of Art Bulletin, volume 46, no. 3, Winter, 1988–1989
