= Museum of Mining and Gothic Art =

Museum in Leogang, Austria

Coordinates: 47°26′31″N 12°42′37″E

Founded in 1992 the Museum of Mining and Gothic Art Leogang ist located in Hütten, Leogang, Zell am See District, in the Austrian Province of Salzburg.

Its mission is to honor the 3000 years long mining tradition of the region. The museum’s collection consists of mining exhibits and Gothic art. In the Middle Ages the mining profits were invested in Gothic art. The museum makes this connection visible upholding the motto flourishing mine equals flourishing art. Acquisition and exhibition priorities focus on sacred Gothic art. The Museum of Mining and Gothic Art Leogang exhibits works of art from its own collection as well as loan objects from renowned art museums and collectors.

== Collection ==
The end of the Middle Ages was the heyday of mining in the Prince-Archbishopric of Salzburg, even more so in Leogang. Thanks to the mining profits outstanding works of art could be commissioned which today rank among the finest Gothic art treasures in the world. The museum displays these treasures in twenty exhibitions on 1000 square meters of exhibition space, presenting the wealth of the archbishopric.

=== The Prayer Nut of Mary of Burgundy ===
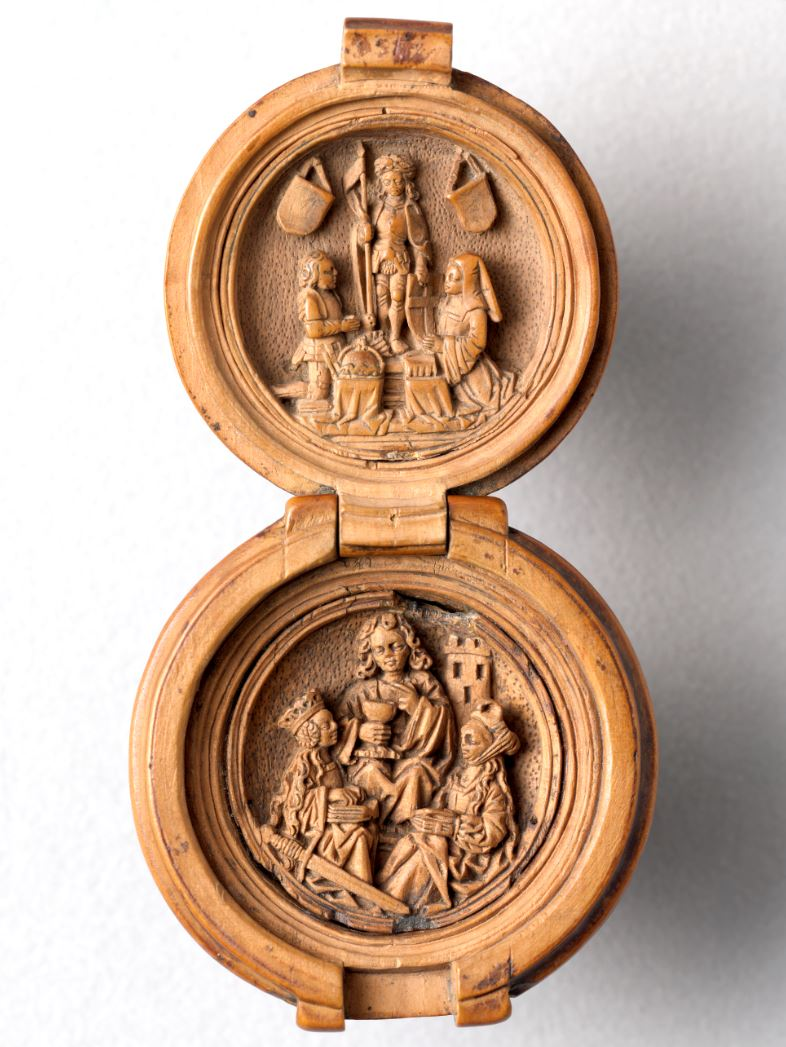
The Museum of Mining and Gothic Art Leogang, The Prayer Nut of Mary of Burgundy.

One of the collection highlight is Mary of Burgundy´s Prayer nut. When travelling Mary of Burgundy, once the wealthiest woman in Europe, child of Charles the Bold and wife of Maximilian of Austria, Holy Roman Emperor, used this miniature sculpture inside a sphere of boxwood as a pocket shrine attached to her rosary. The prayer nut is the size of a walnut and opens into two halves of finely carved reliefs. The upper half of the prayer nut shows Maximilian of Austria with the archducal coronet and Mary of Burgundy. They kneel in prayer in front of Saint George, the patron saint of the House of Habsburg. Saint Catherine with her attribute, the sword, John the Evangelist with the chalice and Saint Barbara with the tower occupy the lower half. The prayer nut is depicted on the cover of the Hours of Mary of Burgundy.

=== The Restitution of a Medieval Cross from Limoges ===
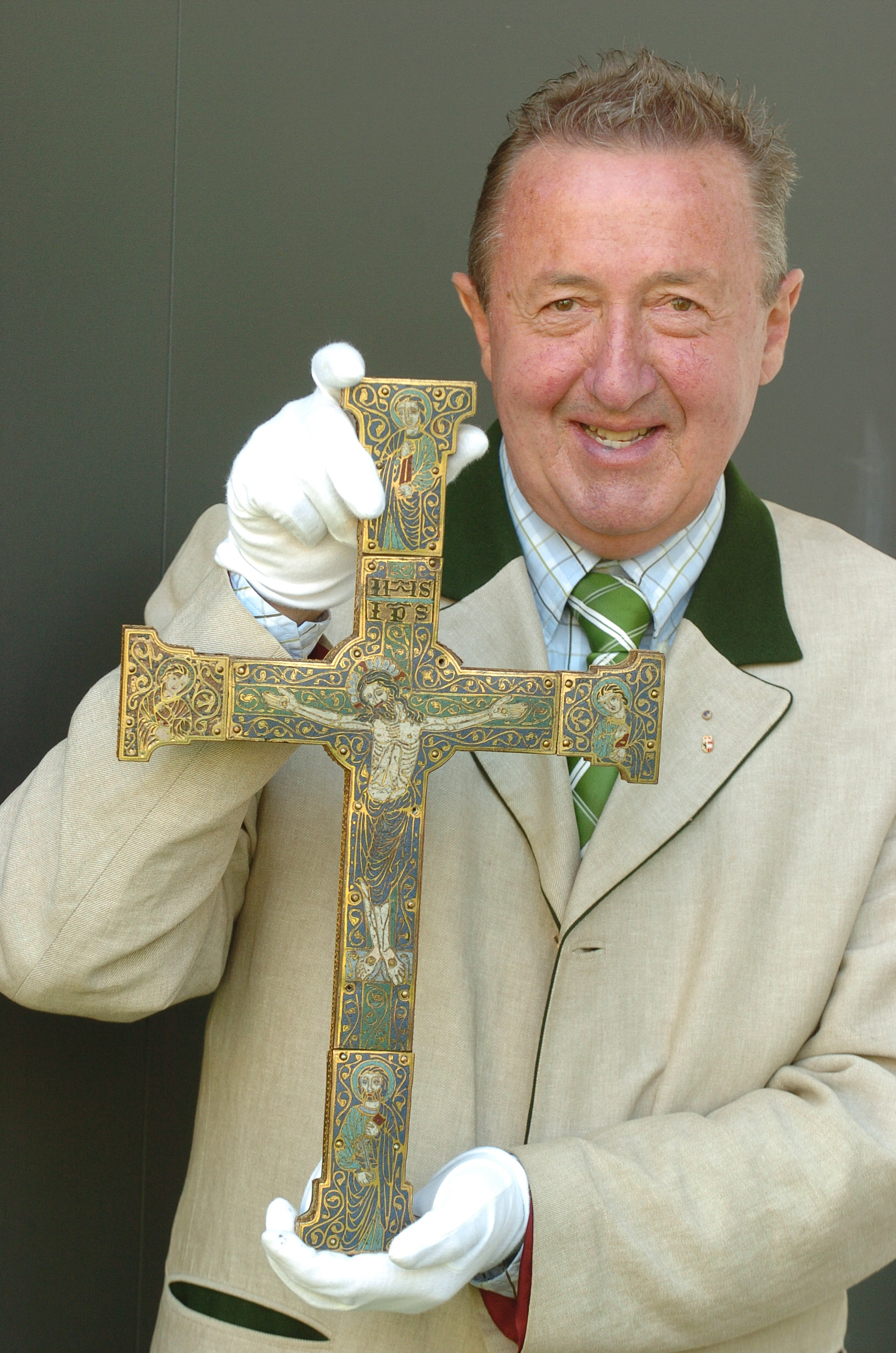
Hermann Mayrhofer holding the Limoges enamel cross restituted to the Princely Family Czartoryski.

A Limoges enamel cross was donated to the museum. It dates to about 1200 and had been made in the earliest European enamel technique in Limoges, in the South of France. In collaboration with the Bavarian National Museum, the Museum of Mining and Gothic Art Leogang found out that the cross was looted art from the Polish princely family Czartoryski. It had been brought to Salzburg during World War II. The cross was of course restituted to the rightful owners without recompense.

== Directors ==
- 1992 – 2022: Hermann Mayrhofer (amongst other awards he received the Polish Decoration of Honor Meritorious for Polish Culture and the Grand Order of Merit of the Province of Salzburg)
- 2022 to present: Andreas Herzog

== Special exhibition ==
2023 Romanesque Art
2022 Gothic Treasures– The Vogl-Reitter Collection
2022 Box Thalers – History in Coins
2019 Beautiful Madonnas #Salzburg. Cast Stone around 1400
2014: Gothic Madonnas on a Lion
2013: Gold and silver in the Archbishopric of Salzburg
2011: Leopold in Leogang - Rudolf Leopold Gothic Collection
2008 800 Years of Coined History. Coins of the Archbishopric of Salzburg
2005 Anton Faistauer. Tradition and the Modern
2003 Virgin Mary. Light in the Middle Ages
2000 Mining Patron Saints: Gothic Sculpture in the Alps

== Awards ==
2021 Nominated for the European Museum of the Year Award
2003 Austrian Seal of Quality for Museums
2003 Museum Award of the Province of Austria
