= Cain and Abel (Tintoretto) =

Painting by Jacopo Tintoretto

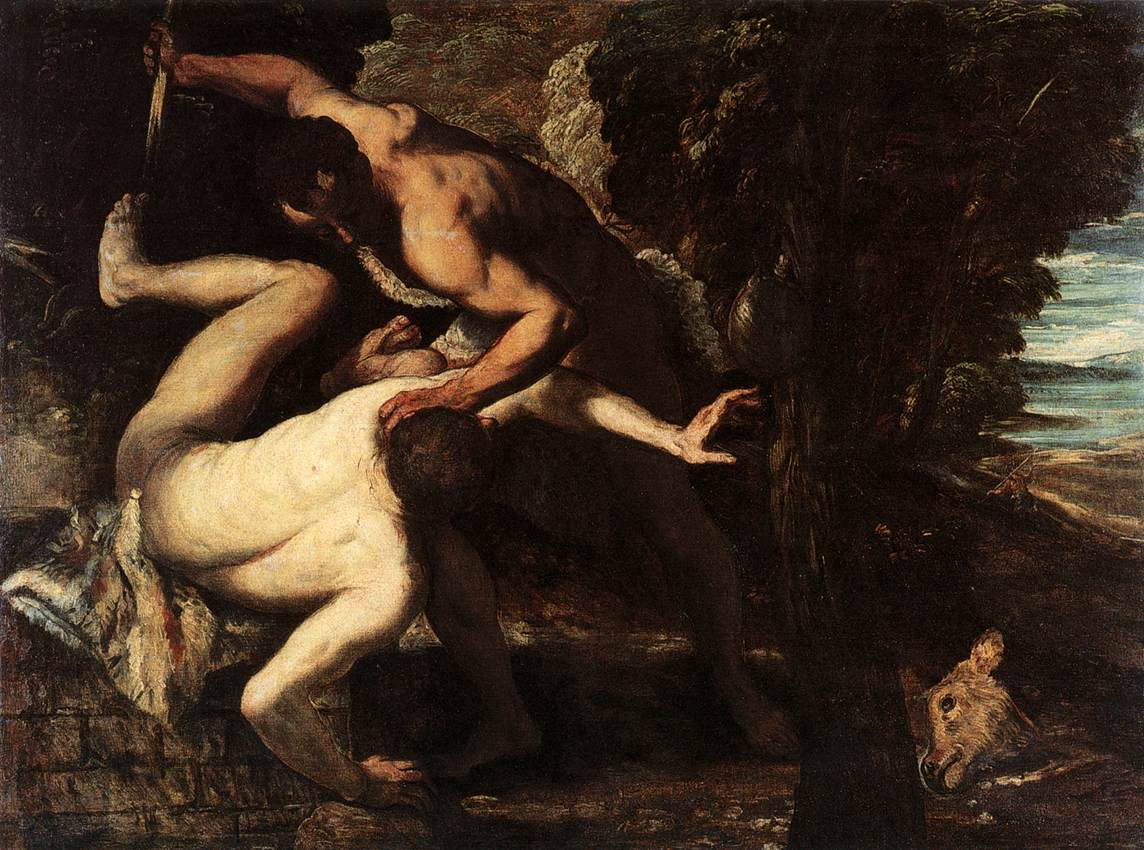
- Artist: Tintoretto
- Year: 1550–1553
- Medium: oil on canvas
- Dimensions: 149 cm × 196 cm (59 in × 77 in)
- Location: Gallerie dell'Accademia, Venice

Cain and Abel (Italian: Caino e Abele), also known as The Murder of Abel, and The Death of Abel, is an oil painting by the Venetian painter Tintoretto, made around 1550–1553. It is held in the Gallerie dell'Accademia, in Venice.

== Subject ==
The scene in question is the first murder recounted in the Genesis narrative. Cain and Abel were two brothers, the first sons of Adam and Eve. Cain, the firstborn, was a farmer, and Abel was a shepherd. The brothers made sacrifices to God, but God accepted the firstlings offered by Abel rather than the first fruits offered by Cain. Cain, full of jealousy, called out Abel into the fields, and slew him.

== History ==
For the Scuola della Trinità, Tintoretto painted four or five pictures depicting subjects taken from the Book of Genesis, having reference to the biblical creation of the world; of which two are preserved untouched, and now hang on either side of Titian's Assumption in the Academy at Venice. These are The Death of Abel and Adam and Eve, of which William Roscoe Osler writes:

The concentration of effect … is marvellous without being violent. The influence of the antique sculptures is apparent in the figures, accompanied with a great knowledge of nature, and of the build of the human form. The landscapes also are most striking, not being allied to a great extent with the Titianesque landscape, but rather heralding a new poetic departure in art, such as probably had a deep effect upon Rubens, Rembrandt, and Turner. Traces may still be perceived in them of Schiavone's influence.

John Ruskin expresses his admiration in terms of enthusiasm:

Next, look on the right and left of it [Titian's Assumption], at the two dark pictures over the doors (63, 25). Darkness visible, with flashes of lightning through it. The thunder-cloud upon us, rent with fire. Those are Tintorets; finest possible Tintorets; best possible examples of what, in absolute power of painting is the supremest work, so far as I know, in all the world.

== Analysis ==
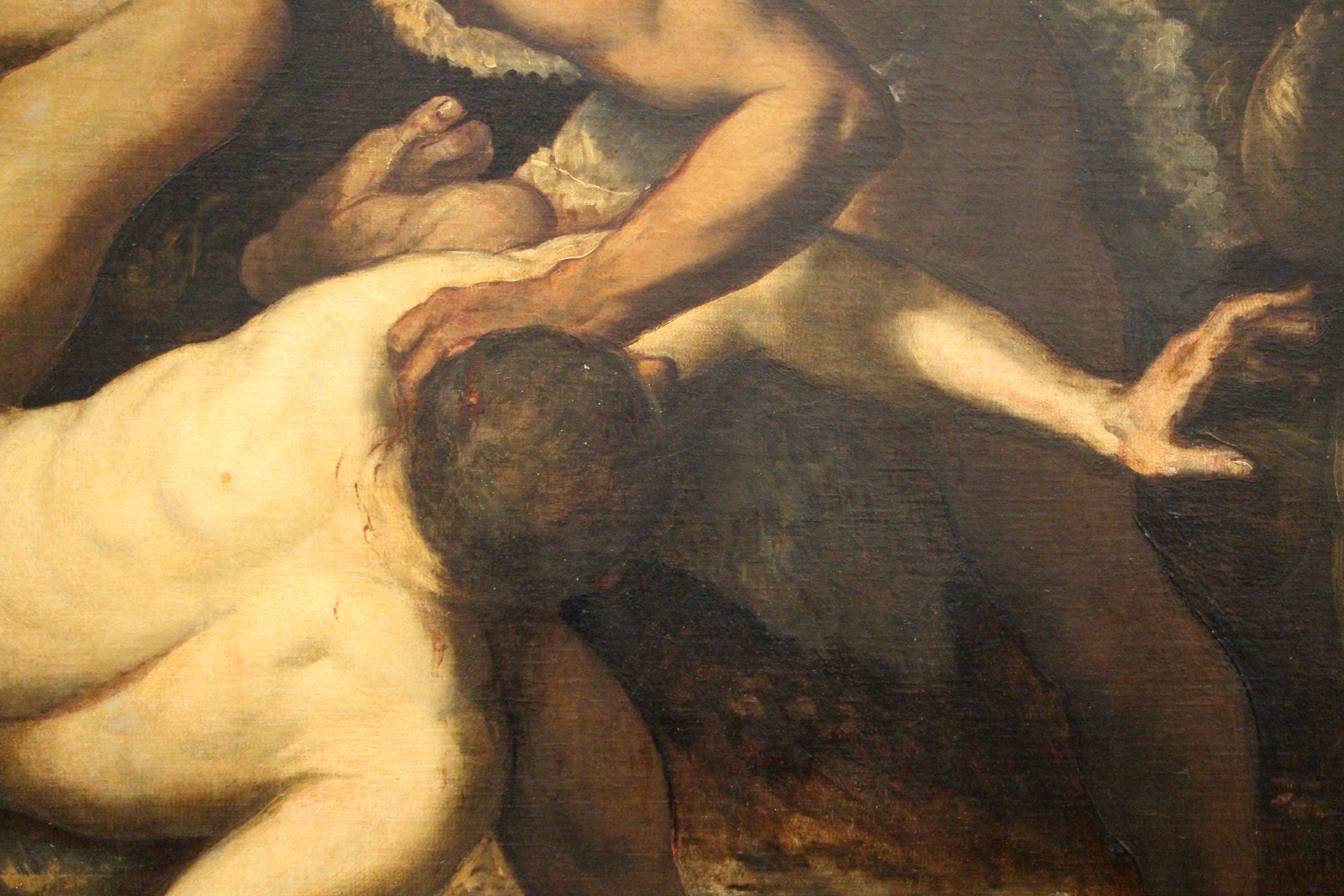
Cain and Abel (detail)

The depiction of Cain killing Abel has been admired for its energy and violence, as Evelyn March Phillipps observes:

The execution is so charged with emotion, that subject and technique are inseparable, and it becomes the most vehement and terrible piece of work he ever produced. The contrast is keen between the young elastic Abel, with balance lost, and leg and arm thrown out in a desperate effort to recover equilibrium, and the powerful, muscular Cain, vibrating with concentrated hate and determined purpose. The expression of the hand, vainly grasping and finding nothing, makes an appeal that is like a cry for help. The gloomy cypresses and the lurid night-clouds have a wildness, such as might act upon a wild nature and drive it on to fierce and passionate deeds done in the scorn of consequence, and the sure and impetuous brushwork is almost as responsible as the design for the sense of overpowering energy which it conveys.

== Sources ==
- Holborn, J. B. Stroughton (1907). Jacopo Robusti, Called Tintoretto. Williamson, G. C. (ed.). The Great Masters in Painting and Sculpture. London: George Bell & Sons. pp. 13, 14, 31, 32, 125.
- Krischel, Roland (2000). Meister der italienischen Kunst. Tintoretto [Jacopo Tintoretto, 1519–1594]. Translated by Bell, Anthea. Germany: Könemann Verlagsgesellschaft. p. 41.
- Newton, Eric (1972). Tintoretto. Westport, CT: Greenwood Press. pp. 46, 48, 78.
- Osler, W. Roscoe (1892). Tintoretto. Illustrated Biographies of the Great Artists. London: Sampson Low, Marston, Searle, & Rivington. pp. 24, 93.
- Phillipps, Evelyn March (1911). Tintoretto. London: Methuen & Co. Ltd. p. 45.
- Ruskin, John (1877). Guide to the Principal Pictures in the Academy of Fine Arts at Venice. London and Aylesbury: Hazell, Watson, and Viney. p. 10.
- Stearns, Frank Preston (1894). Life and Genius of Jacopo Robusti, Called Tintoretto. New York and London: G. P. Putnam's Sons. pp. 61, 82, 109, 110, 153, 319.
- "Cain and Abel". Gallerie dell'Accademia di Venezia. 2020. Retrieved 8 August 2022.
