= Tree of the knowledge of good and evil =

In Judaism and Christianity, a tree in the Garden of Eden

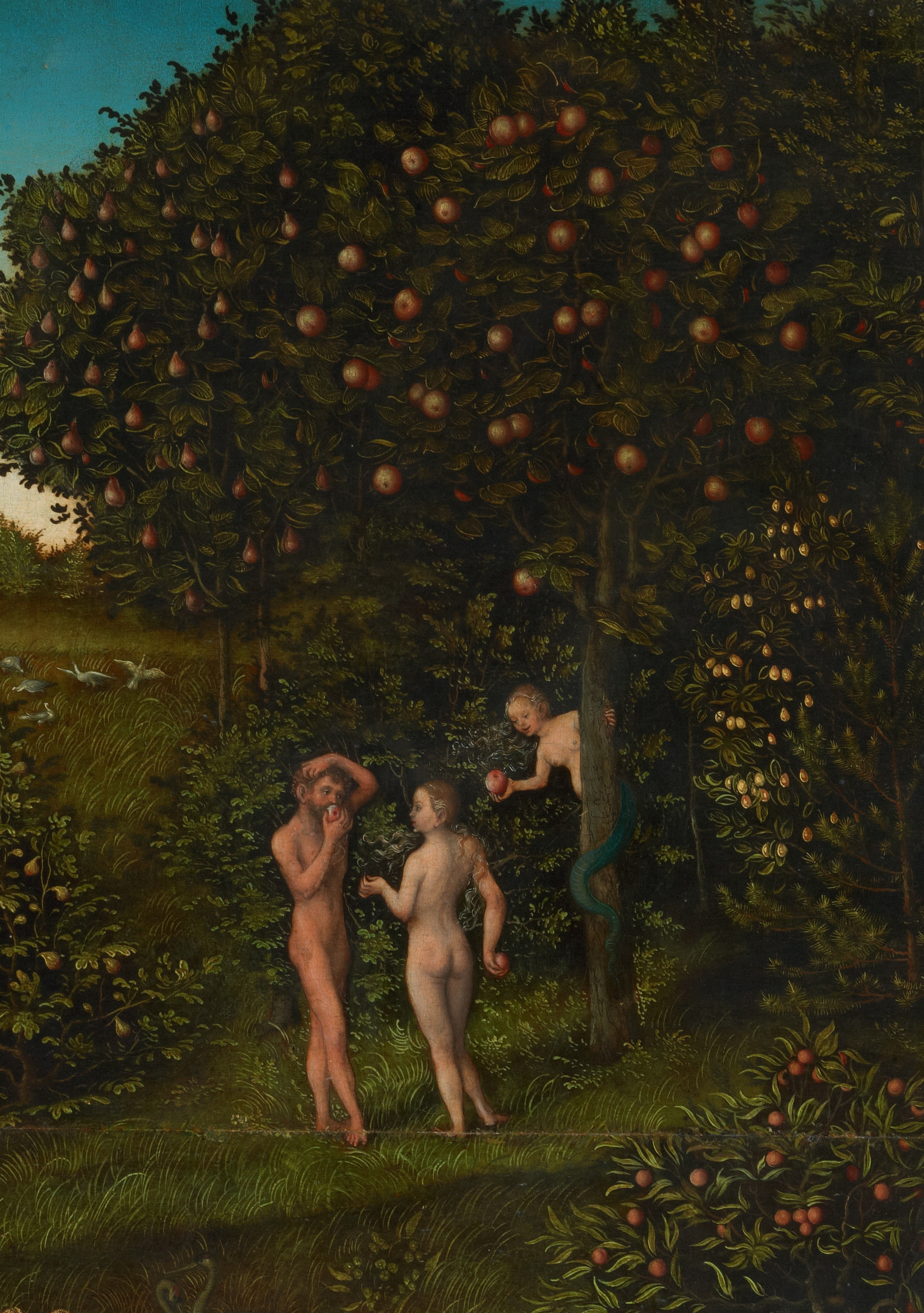
Adam and Eve - Paradise, the fall of man as depicted by Lucas Cranach the Elder, the tree of knowledge of good and evil is on the right

In Judaism and Christianity, the tree of the knowledge of good and evil (Tiberian Hebrew: עֵץ הַדַּעַת טוֹב וָרָע, romanized: ʿēṣ haddaʿaṯ ṭōḇ wārāʿ, [ʕesˤ hadaʕaθ tˤov wɔrɔʕ]; Latin: Lignum scientiae boni et mali) is one of two specific trees in the story of the Garden of Eden in Genesis 2–3, the other being the tree of life. Some scholars have argued that the tree of the knowledge of good and evil is just another name for the tree of life.

== In Genesis ==
=== Narrative ===
Genesis 2 narrates that God places the man, Adam, in a garden with trees whose fruits he may eat, but forbids him to eat from "the tree of the knowledge of good and evil". God forms a woman, Eve, after this command is given. In Genesis 3, a serpent persuades Eve to eat its forbidden fruit and she lets Adam taste it also. Consequently, God expels them from the garden.

Unlike the tree of life, the tree of the knowledge of good and evil does not appear anywhere else in the Hebrew Bible or in other ancient Semitic cultures. However, the phrase "knowledge of good and evil" does appear elsewhere in the Bible (e.g., Deuteronomy 1:39 and 2 Samuel 14:17–20).

=== Meaning of good and evil ===
The phrase in Hebrew, טוֹב וָרָע (tov wa-raʿ) literally translates as "good and evil". This may be an example of the type of figure of speech known as merism, a literary device that pairs opposite terms together in order to create a general meaning, so that the phrase "good and evil" would simply imply "everything". This is seen in the Egyptian expression "evil-good", which is normally employed to mean "everything". However, if "tree of the knowledge of good and evil" is to be understood to mean a tree whose fruit imparts knowledge of everything, this phrase does not necessarily denote a moral concept. This view is held by several scholars.

Given the context of disobedience to God, other interpretations of the implications of this phrase also demand consideration. Robert Alter emphasizes the point that when God forbids the man to eat from that particular tree, he says that if he does so, he is "doomed to die." The Hebrew behind this is in a form regularly used in the Hebrew Bible for issuing death sentences.

However, there are myriad modern scholarly interpretations regarding the term הדעת טוב ורע (Hada'at tov wa-ra "the knowledge of good and evil") in Genesis 2–3, such as wisdom, omniscience, sexual knowledge, moral discrimination, maturity, and other qualities. According to scholar Nathan French, the term likely means "the knowledge for administering reward and punishment," suggesting that the knowledge forbidden by Yahweh and yet acquired by the humans in Genesis 2–3 is the wisdom for wielding ultimate power.

== Religious views ==
=== Judaism ===
Jewish sources suggest different possible identities for the tree: a fig tree (as fig leaves were used to clothe Adam and Eve after the sin), a grape vine (as "nothing brings wailing to the world like wine"), a stalk of wheat (as "a child does not know how to say Father and Mother until he tastes grain"), an etrog (as the description in Genesis 3:6 matches the etrog fruit's beautiful appearance, or else the etrog tree's allegedly tasty bark), or a nut tree.

In Jewish tradition, the tree of knowledge and the eating of its fruit represents the beginning of the mixture of good and evil together. Before that time, the two were separate, and evil had only a nebulous existence in potential. While free choice did exist before eating the fruit, evil existed as an entity separate from the human psyche, and it was not in human nature to desire it. Eating and internalizing the forbidden fruit changed this, and thus was born the yetzer hara, the evil inclination.

According to Rashi, the sin came about because Eve added an additional clause to the divine command: "Neither shall you touch it." By saying this, Eve added to YHWH's command, and thereby came to detract from it, as it is written: "Do not add to His Words" (Proverbs 30:6). However, In Legends of the Jews, it was Adam who had devoutly forbidden Eve to touch the tree even though God had only mentioned the eating of the fruit.

According to one source, Eve also fed the fruit to the animals, leading to their mortality as well.

In the Kabbalah, the sin of the tree of knowledge (called Cheit Eitz HaDa'at) brought about the great task of beirurim, sifting through the mixture of good and evil in the world to extract and liberate the sparks of holiness trapped therein. Since evil no longer had independent existence, it henceforth depended on holiness to draw down the Divine life-force, on whose "leftovers" it then feeds and derives existence. Once evil is separated from holiness through beirurim, its source of life is cut off, causing the evil to disappear. This is accomplished through observance of the 613 commandments in the Torah, which deal primarily with physical objects wherein good and evil are mixed together. The sin of the tree caused God's presence (Shechinah) to depart from earth; in kabbalah, the task of beirurim rectifies the sin of the tree and causes the Shechinah to return.

=== Christianity ===
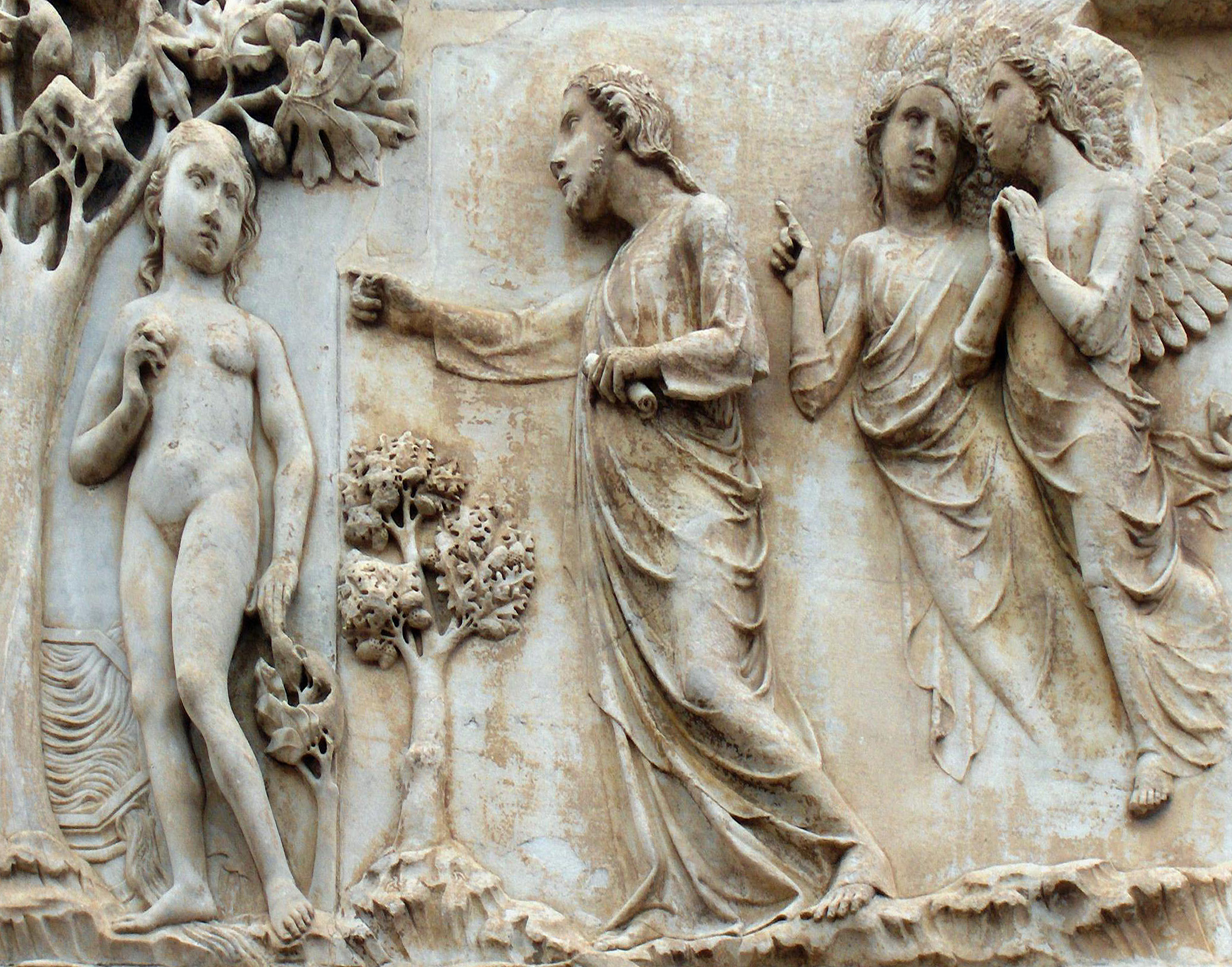
A marble bas relief by Lorenzo Maitani on the Orvieto Cathedral, Italy, depicts Eve and the tree.

In Christian tradition, consuming the fruit of the tree of knowledge of good and evil was the original sin committed by Adam and Eve that led to the fall of man in Genesis 3.

Augustine of Hippo taught that the "tree" should be understood both symbolically and as a real tree – similarly to Jerusalem being both a real city and a figure of Heavenly Jerusalem. Augustine underlined that the fruits of that tree were not evil by themselves, because everything that God created "was good" (Genesis 1:12). It was disobedience of Adam and Eve, who had been told by God not to eat off the tree (Genesis 2:17), that caused disorder in the creation, thus humanity inherited sin and guilt from Adam and Eve's sin.

In Western Christian art, the fruit of the tree is commonly depicted as the apple, which originated in central Asia. This depiction may have originated as a Latin pun: by eating the mālum (apple), Eve contracted malum (evil). According to the Bible, there is nothing to show the forbidden fruit of the tree of the knowledge of good and evil was necessarily an apple.

=== Gnosticism ===
Uniquely, the Gnostic religion held that the tree was entirely positive or even sacred. Per this saga, it was the archons who told Adam and Eve not to eat its fruit, before lying to them by claiming they would die after tasting it. Later in the story, an instructor is sent from the Pleroma by the aeons to save humanity and reveal gnosis. This savior does so by telling Adam and Eve that eating the fruit is the way into salvation. Examples of the narrative can be found within the Gnostic manuscripts On the Origin of the World and the Secret Book of John.

Manichaeism, which has been considered a Gnostic sect, echoes these notions as well, presenting the primordial aspect of Jesus as the instructor.

=== Islam ===
In the Quran, the tree is never referred to as the "tree of the knowledge of good and evil" but rather typically as "the tree" or (in the words of Iblis) as the "tree of immortality". Muslims believe that when God created Adam and Eve, he told them that they could enjoy everything in the Garden except this tree and so Satan appeared to them, telling them the only reason God forbade them to eat from the tree was that they would become angels or immortal.

When they ate from this tree, their nakedness appeared to them, and they began to sew together leaves from the Garden for their covering. The Quran mentions the sin as being a 'slip'. Consequently, they repented to God and asked for his forgiveness, and were forgiven. In Islamic tradition, the forbidden fruit is not specified in the Quran and according to Sunni belief. In the Shia tradition, the forbidden fruit is considered wheat or barley, not an apple as within Western Christian tradition.

In Quran Al-A'raf 27, God states:

[O] Children of Adam! Let not Satan tempt you as he brought your parents out of the Garden, stripping them of their garments to show them their shameful parts. Surely he [Satan] sees you, he and his tribe, from where you see them not. We have made the Satans the friends of those who do not believe.

== Similar depictions in Akkadian seal ==
A cylinder seal, known as the Adam and Eve cylinder seal, from post-Akkadian periods in Mesopotamia (c. 23rd – 22nd century BCE) has been linked to the Adam and Eve story. Assyriologist George Smith (1840–1876) described the seal as having two facing figures (male and female) seated on each side of a tree, holding out their hands to the fruit, while between their backs is a serpent, giving evidence that the fall of man account was known in early times of Babylonia.

The British Museum disputes this interpretation, and holds that it is a common image from the period depicting a male deity being worshipped by a woman, with no reason to connect the scene with the Book of Genesis.

== See also ==
- Adam and Eve (Latter Day Saint movement)
- Dream of the Rood
- Original sin
