= Prayer nut =

Gothic boxwood miniature sculpture

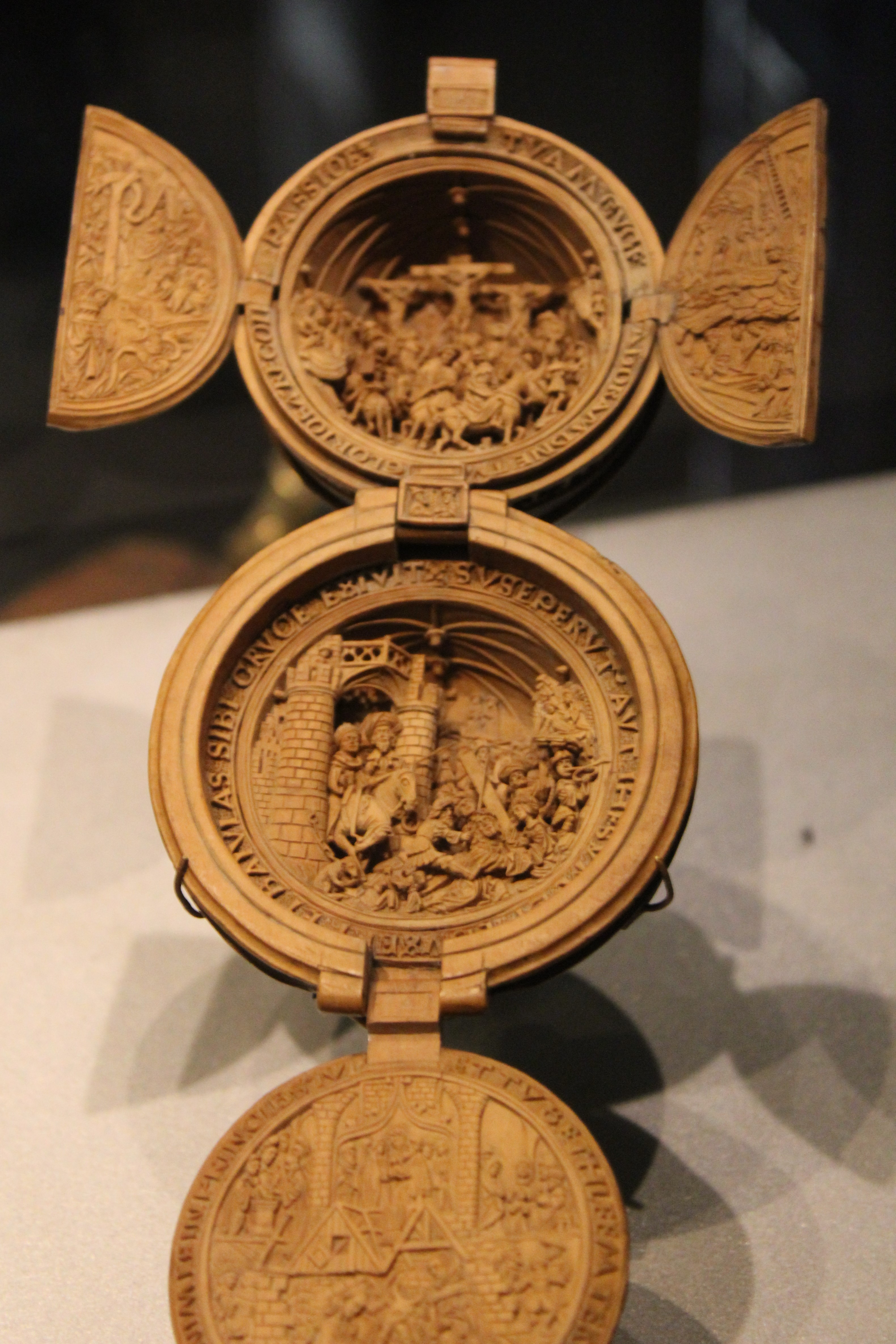
Rosary bead (WB 236), British Museum

Prayer nuts or Prayer beads (Dutch: Gebedsnoot) are very small 16th century Gothic boxwood miniature sculptures, mostly originating from the north of today's Holland. They are typically detachable and open into halves of highly detailed and intricate Christian religious scenes. Their size varies between the size of a walnut and a golf ball. They are mostly the same shape, decorated with carved openwork Gothic tracery and flower heads. Most are 2–5 cm in diameter and designed so they could be held in the palm of a hand during personal devotion or hung from necklaces or belts as fashionable accessories.

Prayer nuts often contain central scenes depicting episodes from the life of Mary or the Passion of Jesus. Some are single beads; more rare examples consist of up to eleven beads, including the "Chatsworth Rosary" gifted by Henry VIII to Catherine of Aragon, which is one of only two surviving boxwood rosaries. The figures are often dressed in fashionable contemporary clothing. The level of detail extends to the figure's shields, jacket buttons, and jewellery. In some instances, they contain carved inscriptions usually related to the meaning of the narrative.

== Etymology ==
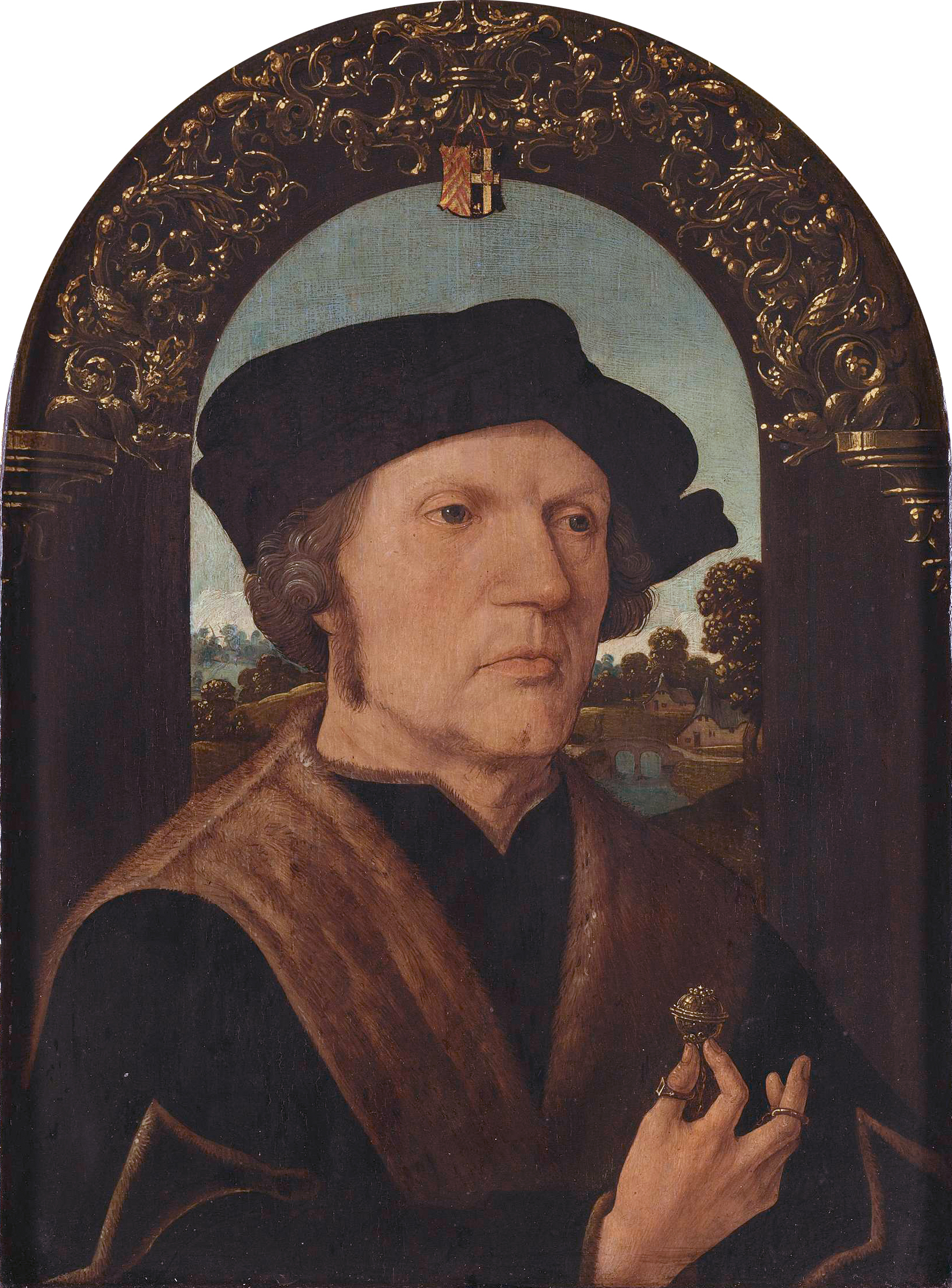
Man holding a prayer nut, by or after Jacob Cornelisz van Oostsanen

The English term prayer nut is derived from the equivalent Dutch word gebedsnoot, and took on common usage in the 18th century. The use of the word "nut" may come from the fact that some of the beads were actually carved from nuts or pits, and although no such miniatures survive, it was a known practice in medieval southern Germany.

== Format ==
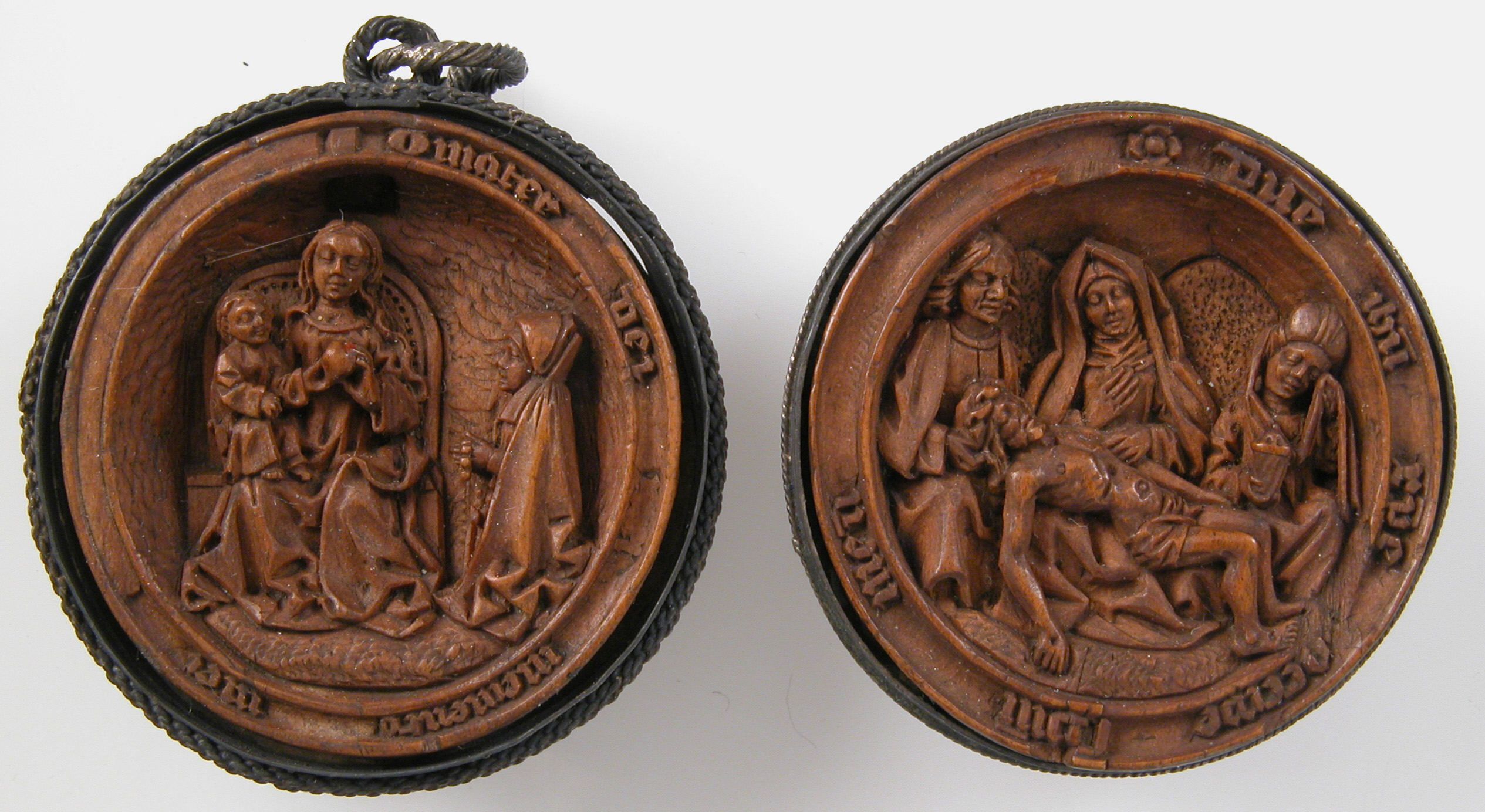
Prayer Bead with the Prayer of the Rosary and the Lamentation, Metropolitan Museum of Art

The beads are quite uniform in size and shape, often with a diameter ranging from around 30 to 65 millimetres. Suda notes how their "spiritual impact...[was] curiously...in inverse proportion to their size". They were often made as two half-shells that could be opened to reveal intricate interior detail. According to the art historian Dora Thornton, when the prayer nut was opened out, it "revealed the representation of the divine hidden inside."

The interiors range considerably in complexity and detail, with the more simple consisting of a low relief cut into a disc that has been rounded off at the back. At their most detailed and complex, Suda describes how the beads "played out like a grand opera on a miniature stage, complete with exotic costumes, elaborate props and animals large and small" and observes how they have an "Alice in Wonderland" quality, wherein "one tumbles headlong into the tiny world created by the carver...into the world they reveal beyond one's immediate surroundings."

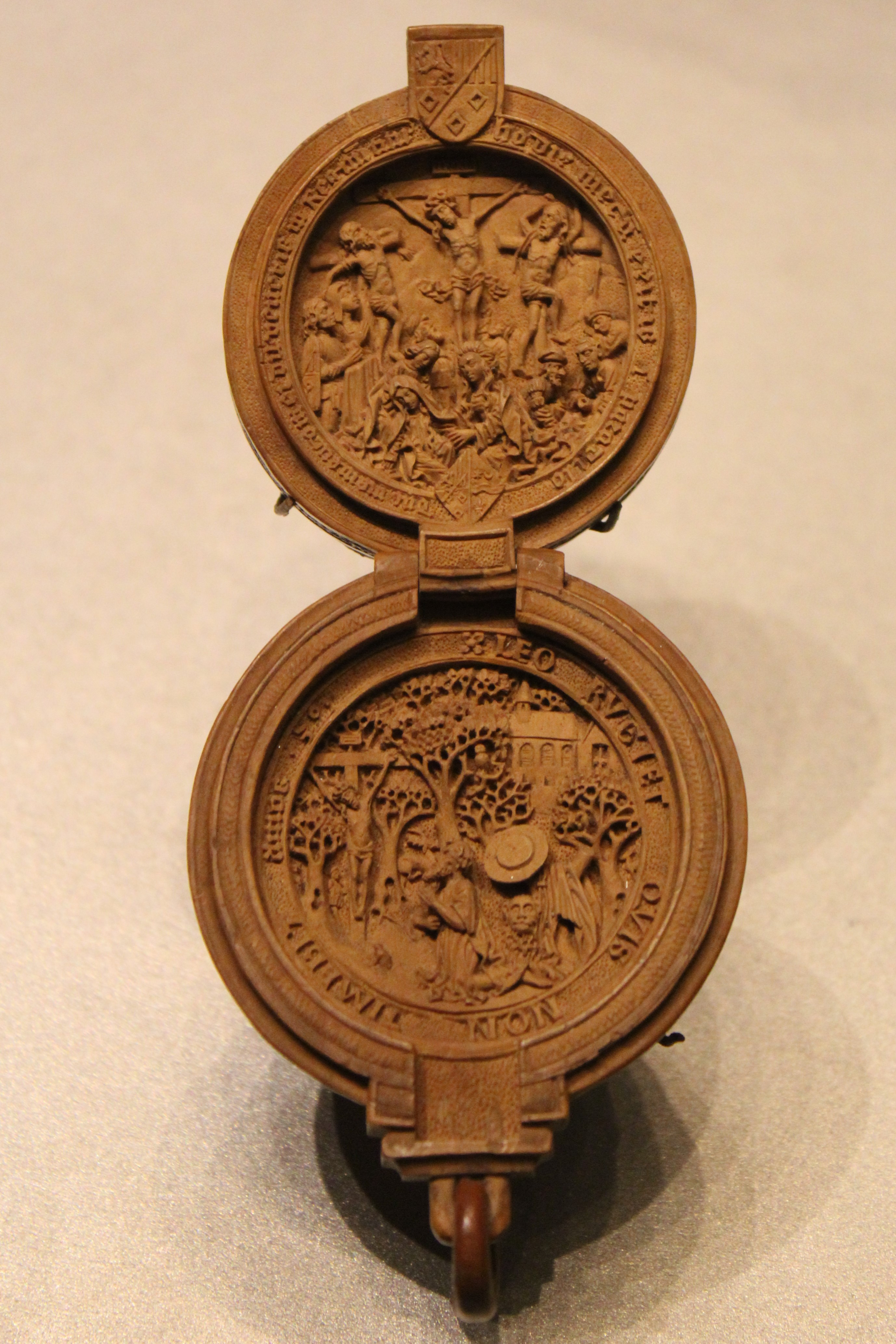
Prayer nut (WB.239) c. 1510–1514, British Museum

The shape of a prayer nut likely carried deep significance; with the outer sheath representing Christ's human flesh; the bead stand, his cross; and the interior reliefs, his divinity. According to Thornton, "unfolding the nut is in itself an act of prayer, like opening up a personal illuminated prayer book, or watching the leaves of a large scale altarpiece being hinged back in a church service". However, Scholten questions their use for private religious devotion, noting how their diminutive scale made them impractical for meditation, as their imagery was not discernible without a magnifying glass or strong spectacles.

== Production ==
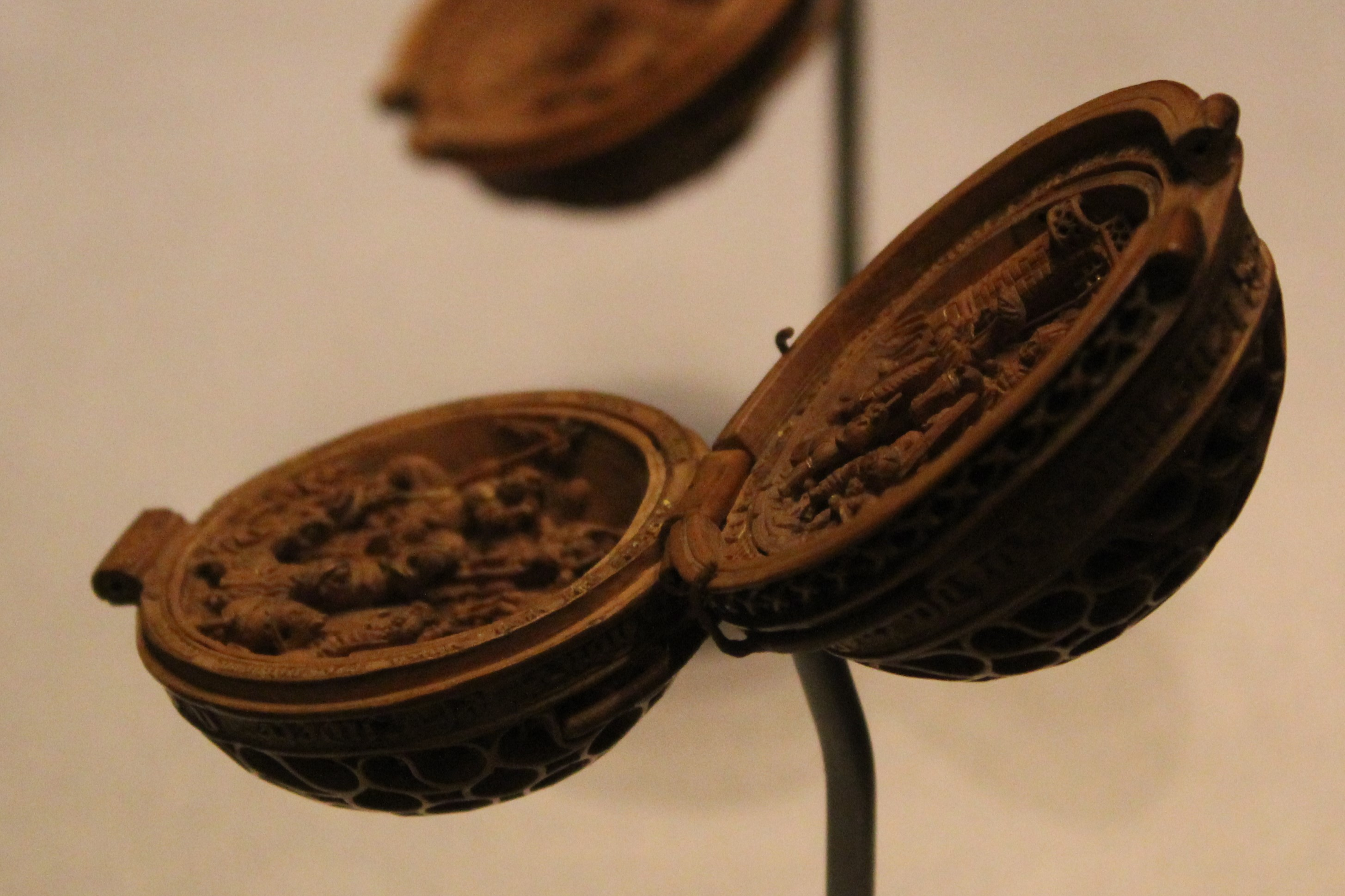
Prayer nut (WB.235) from the side, c. 1510–25, British Museum

Many are thought to have come from the workshop of Adam Dircksz in Delft and were part of a larger tradition of Gothic boxwood miniatures. Important examples are held by various museums, most notably the Rijksmuseum, whose conservator Jaap Leeuwenberg in 1968 first traced their origins to Delft, the Metropolitan Museum of Art, which has several examples from the John Pierpont Morgan bequest, and the Art Gallery of Ontario, with its important Thomson collection. Together, the three museums combined research and held the Small Wonders exhibition, which they each hosted between 2016 and 2017.

Though many are made wholly from wood, others are encased in silver-gilt enclosures which may have made them more suitable for wearing from a belt or being attached to a rosary.

Scholten notes that the tracery may have been intended to suggest that the object contained a small relic, "so that the object took on the character of a talisman and was deemed to have an apotropaic effect". A number contain a wooden loop in the middle of one half so they could be worn hanging from a belt or carried in a case. A fragrant substance was sometimes placed inside the shell, which diffused when the beads were opened, making them comparable to the then fashionable pomanders.

In 1910 when G.C. Williamson wrote his catalogue of the collection for J.P. Morgan, the origin of these prayer nuts was still disputed, but he felt that a portrait painting of an old man in the collection of the Brussels museum that was at that time attributed to Christoph Amberger showed a prayer nut that looked like the rosary bead in the collection.

== See also ==
- Gothic boxwood miniature
- Pomander

== Gallery ==
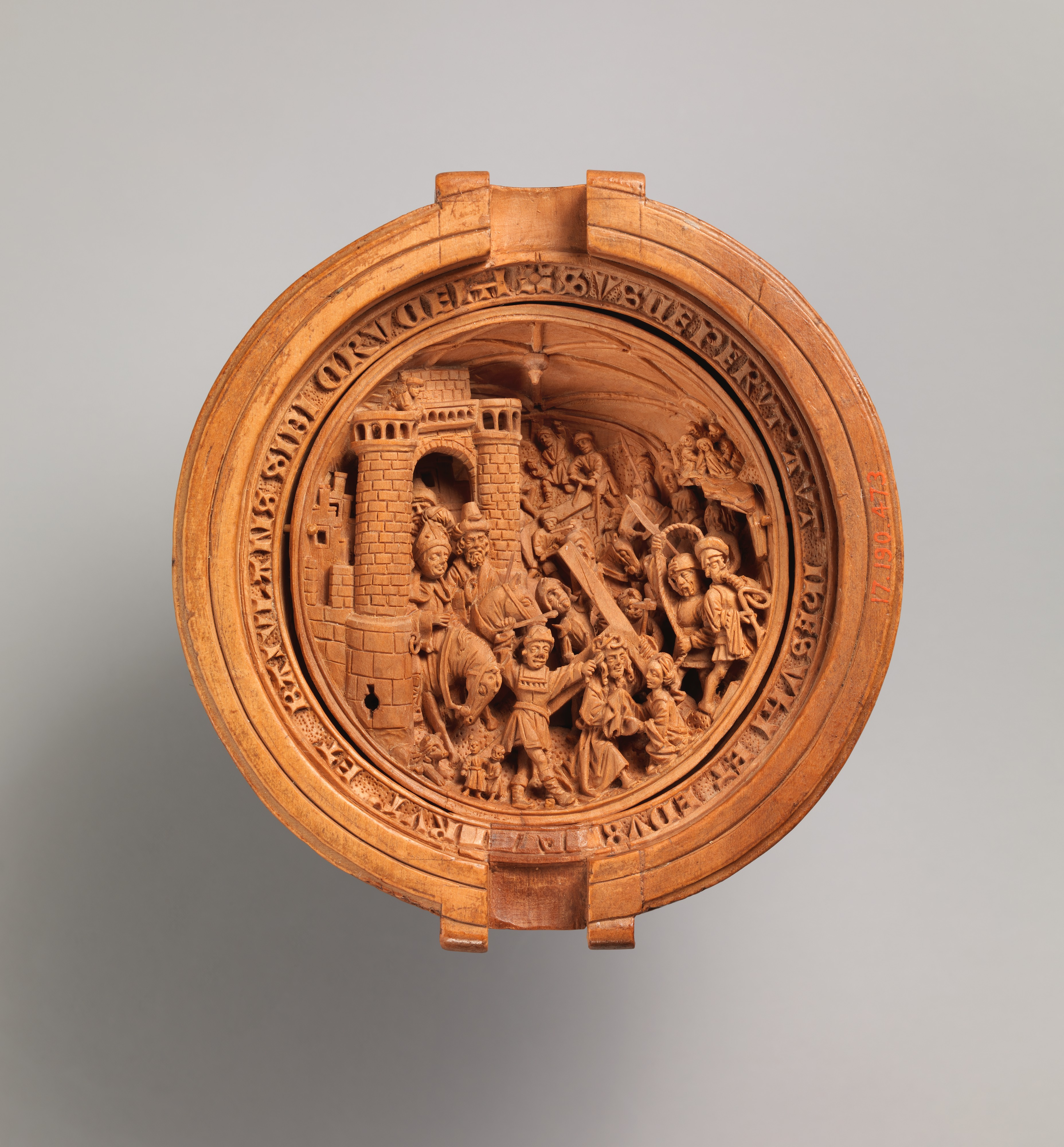
"Half of a Prayer Bead with Jesus Carrying the Cross and the Crucifixion", early 16th century, Metropolitan Museum of Art

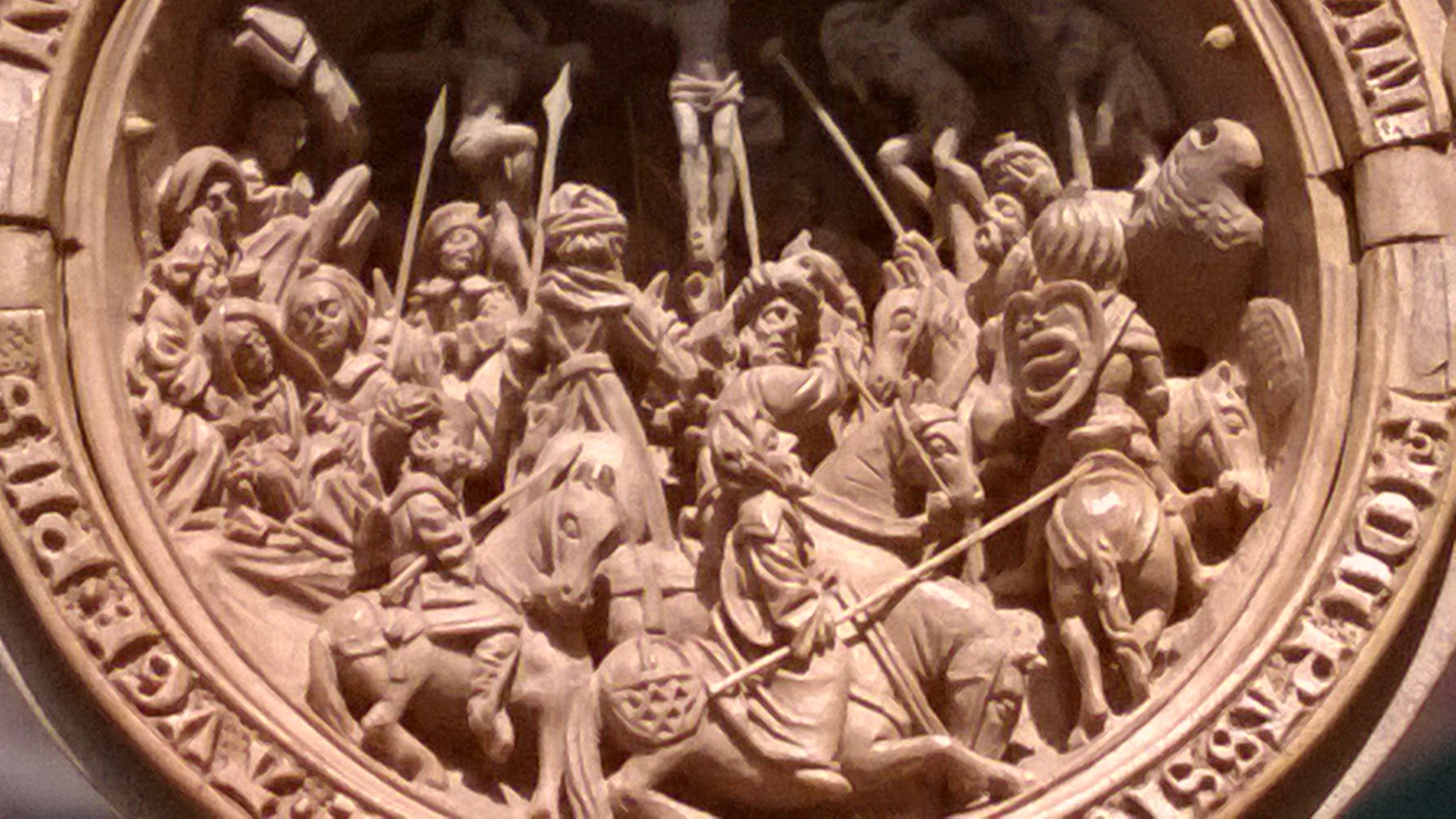
Detail: "Half of a Prayer Bead with Jesus....".

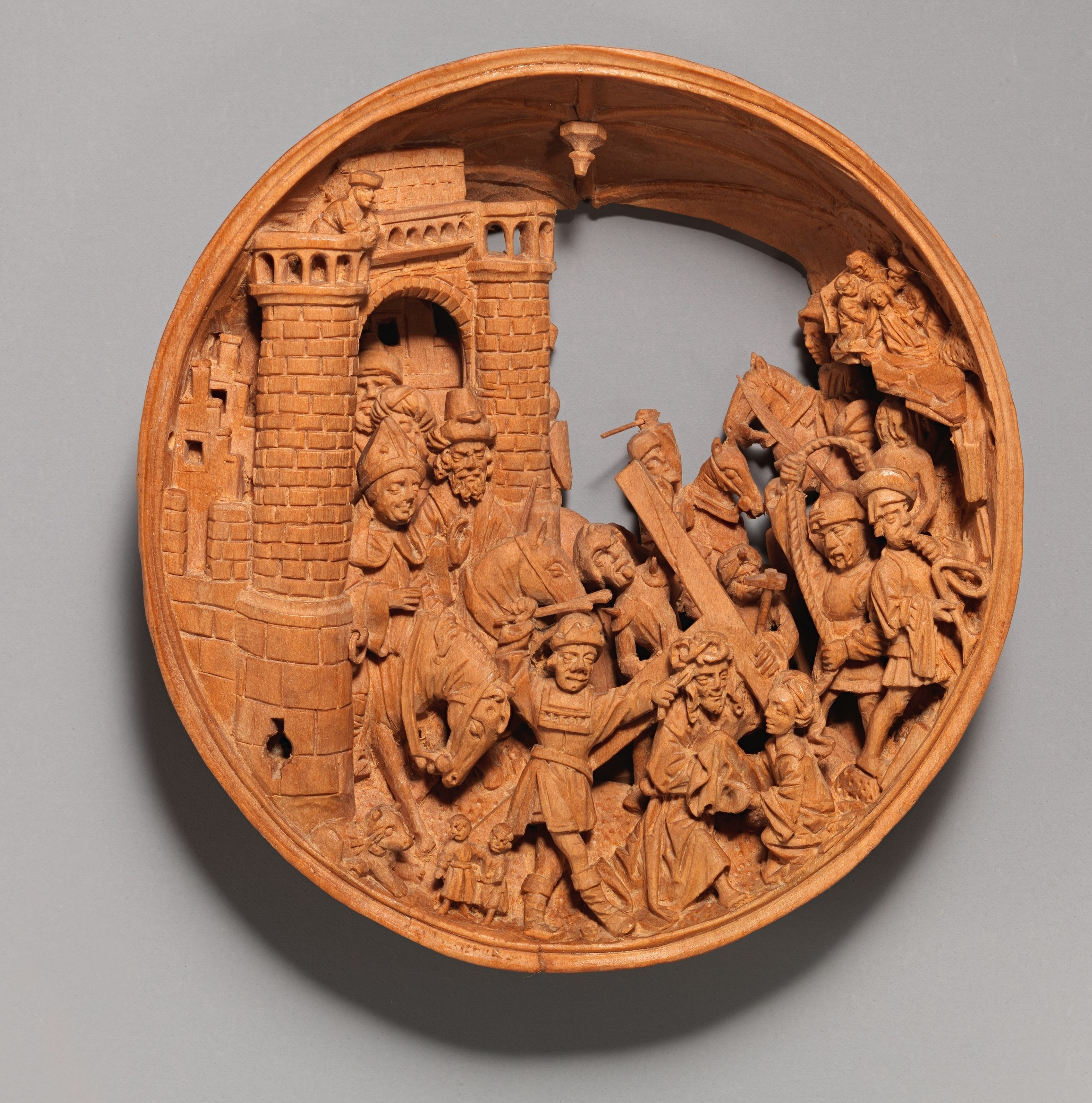
Reverse of "Half of a Prayer Bead with Jesus...",
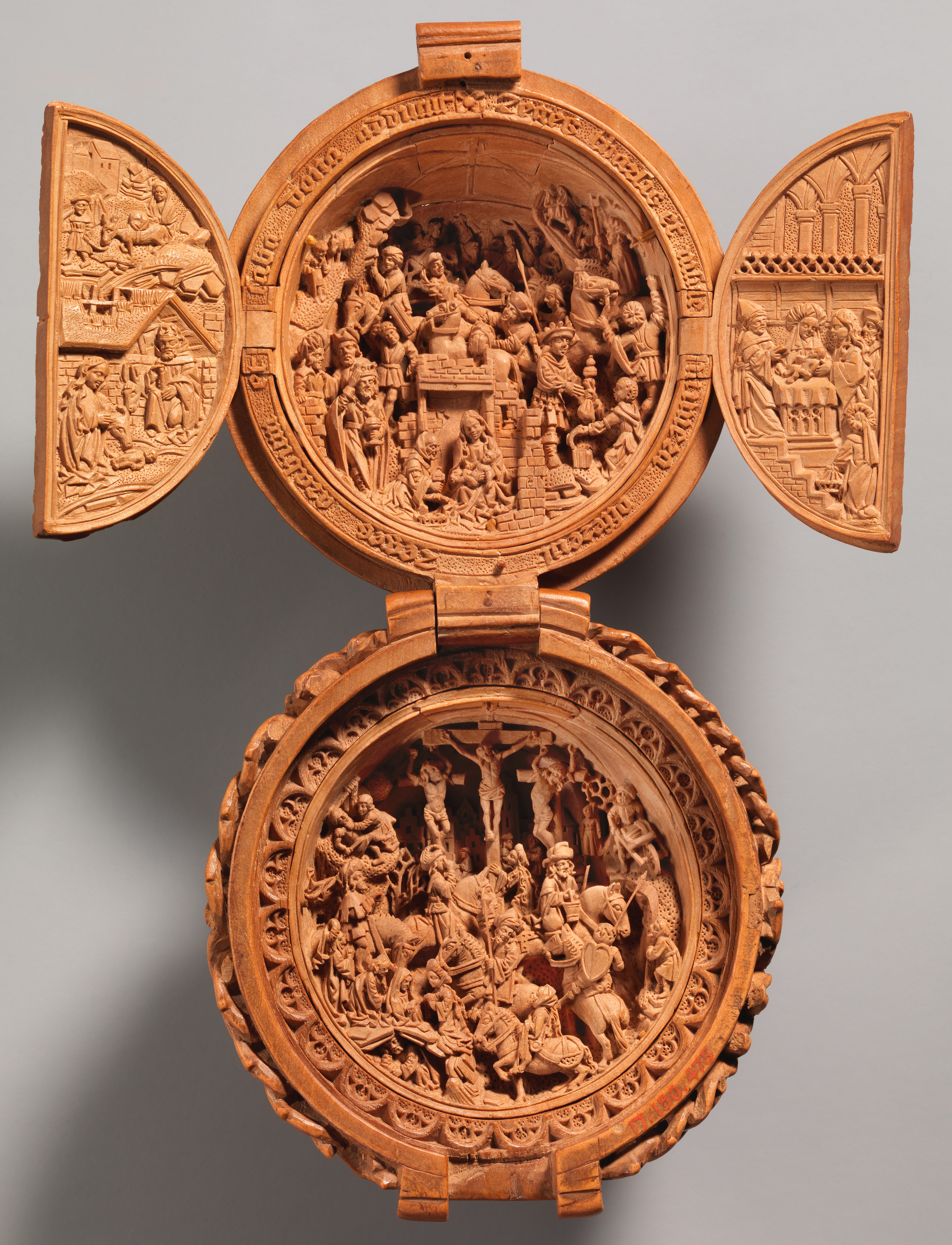
"Prayer Bead with the Adoration of the Magi and the Crucifixion", c. 1500–1510, Metropolitan Museum of Art

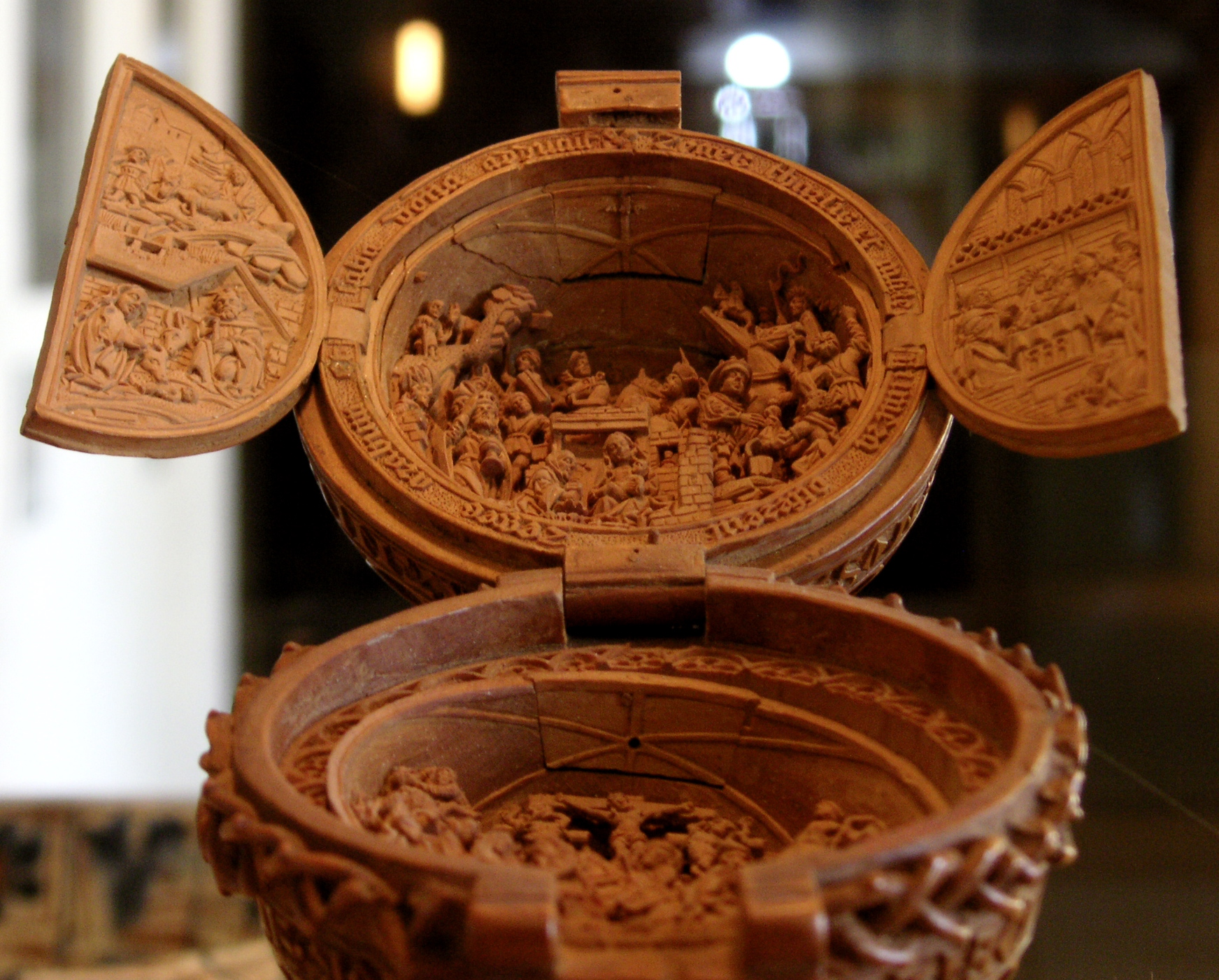
Detail: "Prayer Bead with the Adoration of the Magi and the Crucifixion".
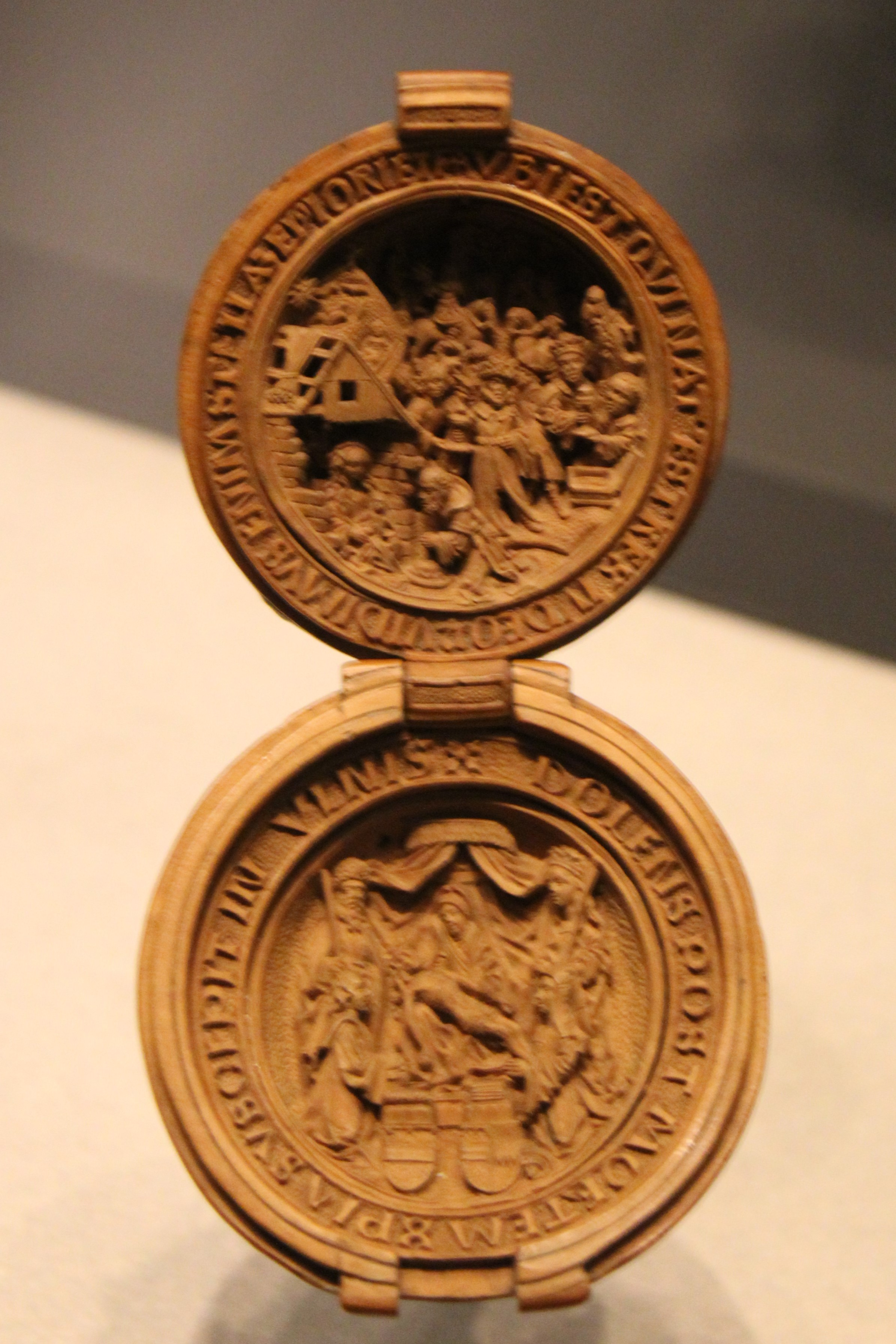
Prayer nut (WB.238) with upper Magi and a lower Pieta with Saint James the Greater, Saint Ursula and inscriptions, c. 1510–1525, British Museum

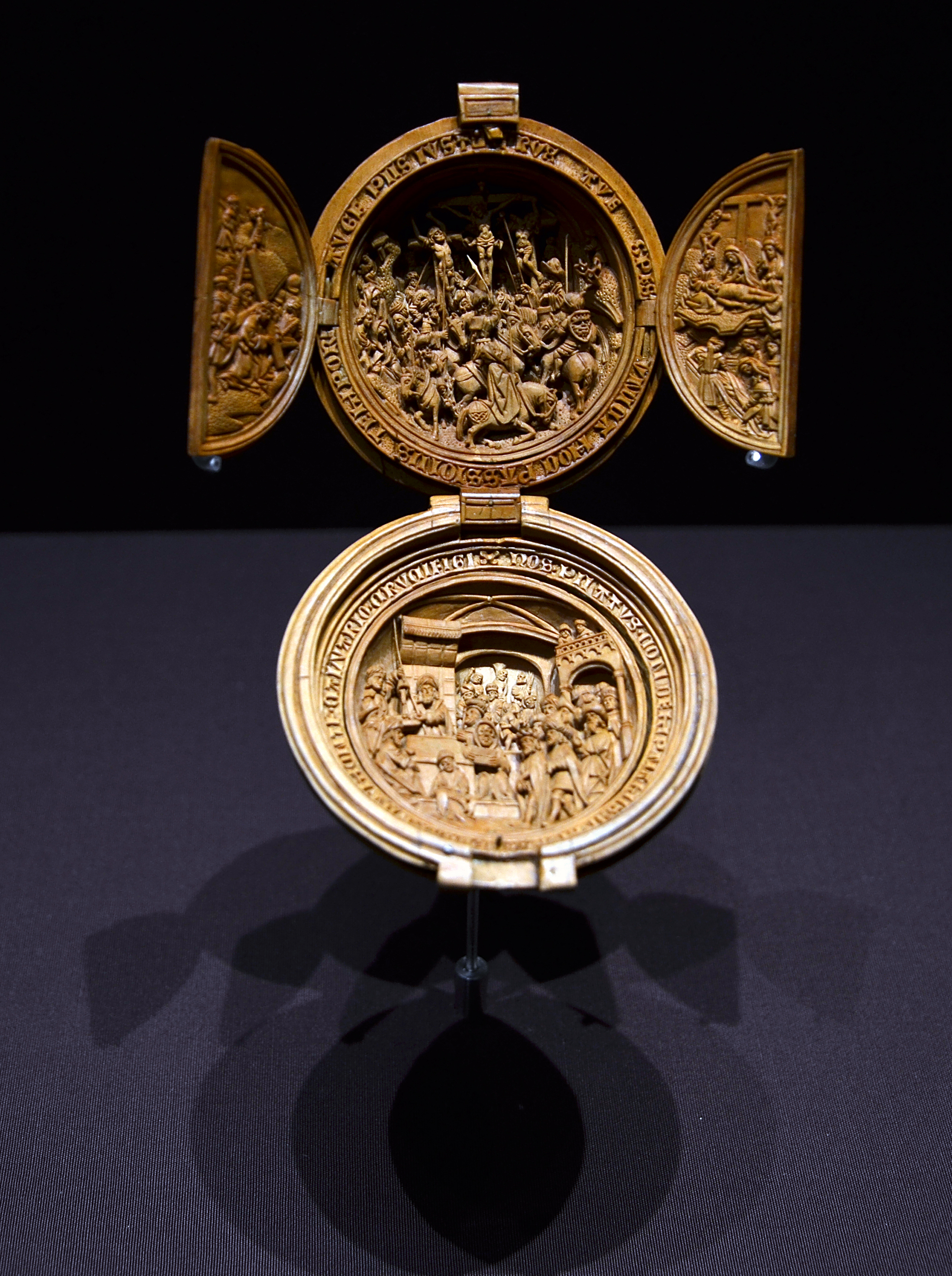
Rosary bead with the Passion of Christ. Netherlands, early 16th century, boxwood. Kunsthistorisches Museum, Vienna

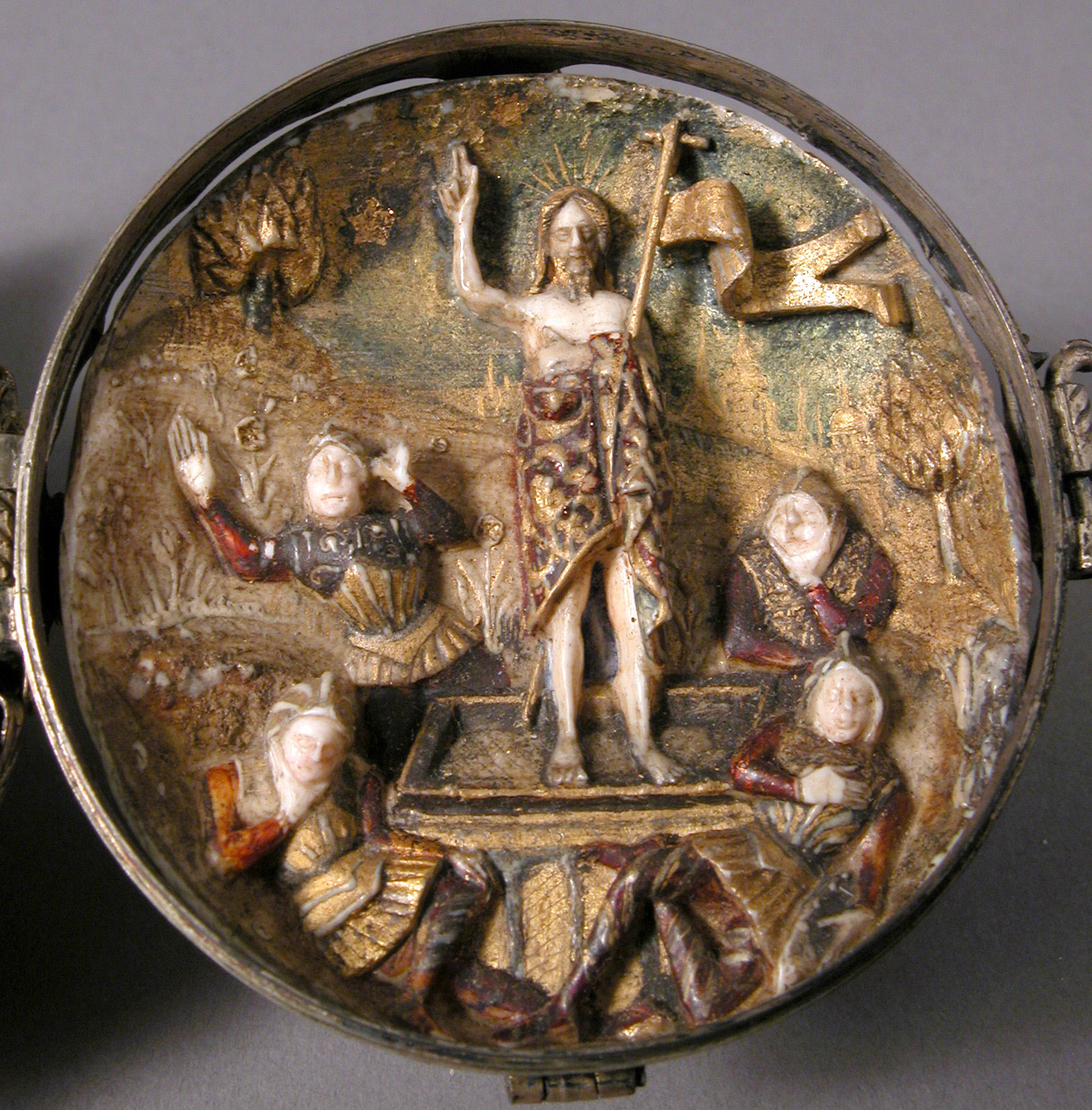
"Rosary Bead with the Crucifixion and Resurrection", a rare Spanish example, with Ivory. Metropolitan Museum of Art
