= Adam and Eve (Baldung) =

Paintings by Hans Baldung

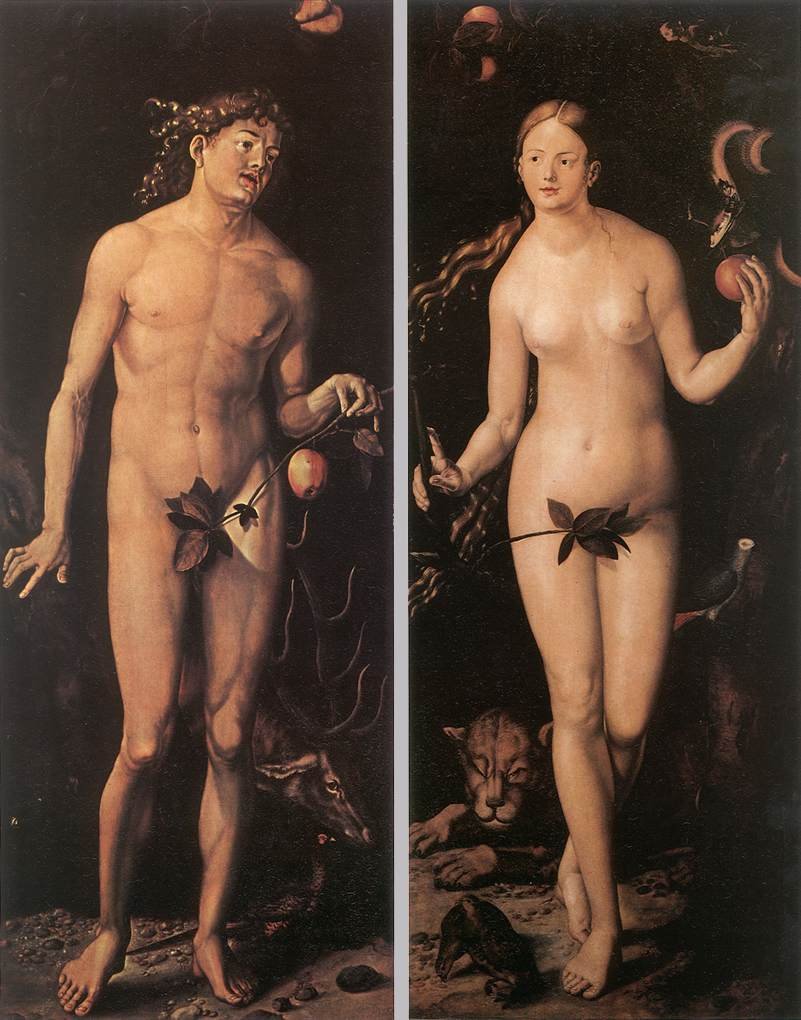
Adam and Eve, by Hans Baldung

Adam and Eve is a pair of oil-on-panel paintings by Hans Baldung Grien, dating to around 1520 and now in the Uffizi in Florence. It is a copy of a pair of works on the same subject by Albrecht Dürer, produced in 1507 and now in the Museo del Prado.

Closely connected to another version in Mainz, the two works were first attributed to Hans Baldung Grien by Von Terey (1894) and Max Friedländer, an attribution now accepted by most other art critics. It faithfully follows Dürer's works, with a quicker and drier style and some additional details such as a deer beside Adam and birds symbolising the four humours and other topics. The nudes' idealised beauty is linked to their bodies' fragility in an interpretation of the vanitas theme.
