= Adam and Eve (Tintoretto) =

Painting by Tintoretto

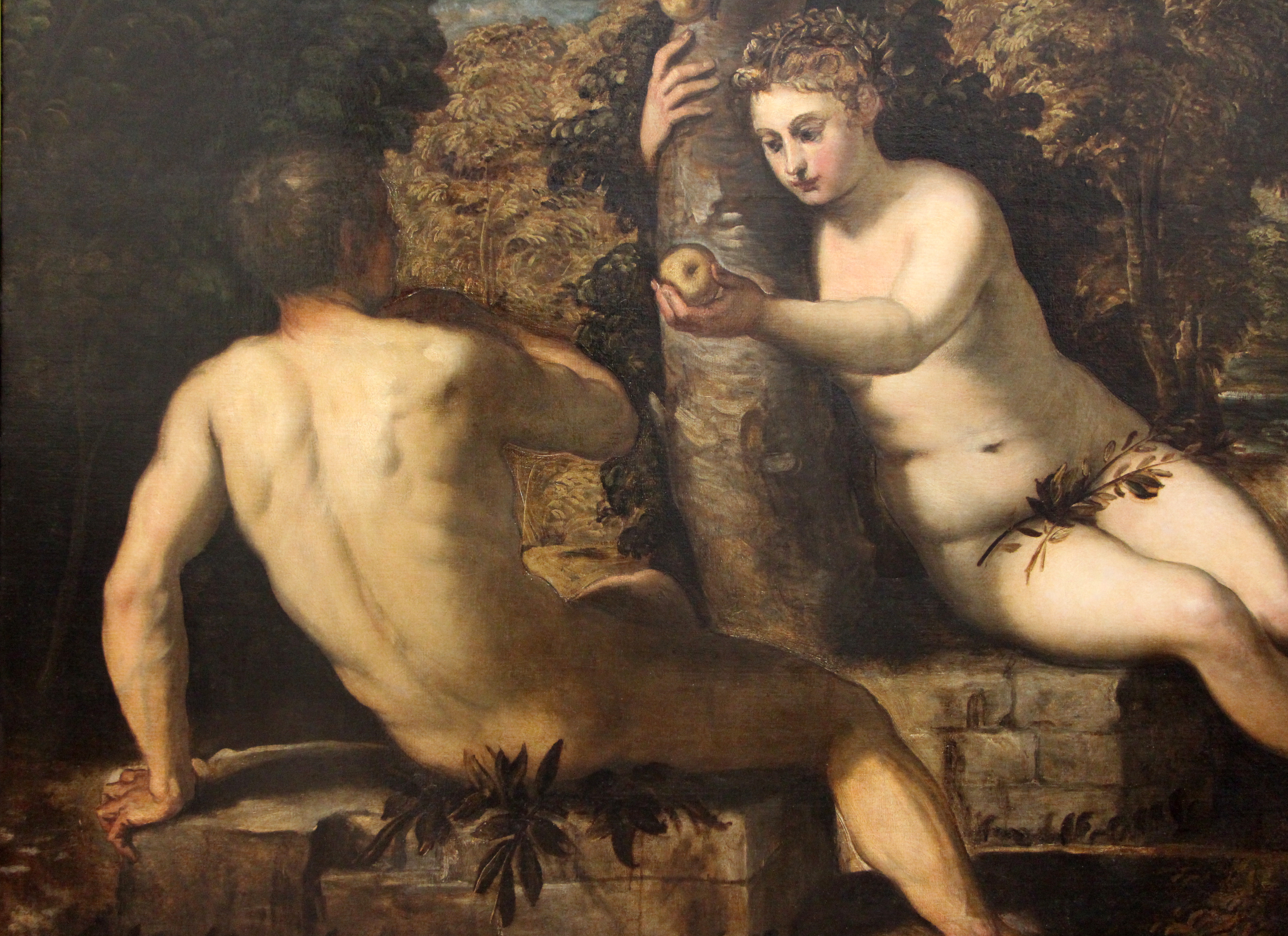
Detail of the painting in the Gallerie dell'Accademia

Adam and Eve (Italian: Adamo ed Eva), also known as The Temptation of Adam, Original Sin, and The Fall of Man, may refer to either of two similar works by the Venetian painter Tintoretto: an oil painting in the collection of the Gallerie dell'Accademia in Venice, made around 1550–1553; and a panel in the ceiling of the Upper Hall of the Scuola Grande di San Rocco, made around 1577–1578.

== First version ==
The Temptation of Adam
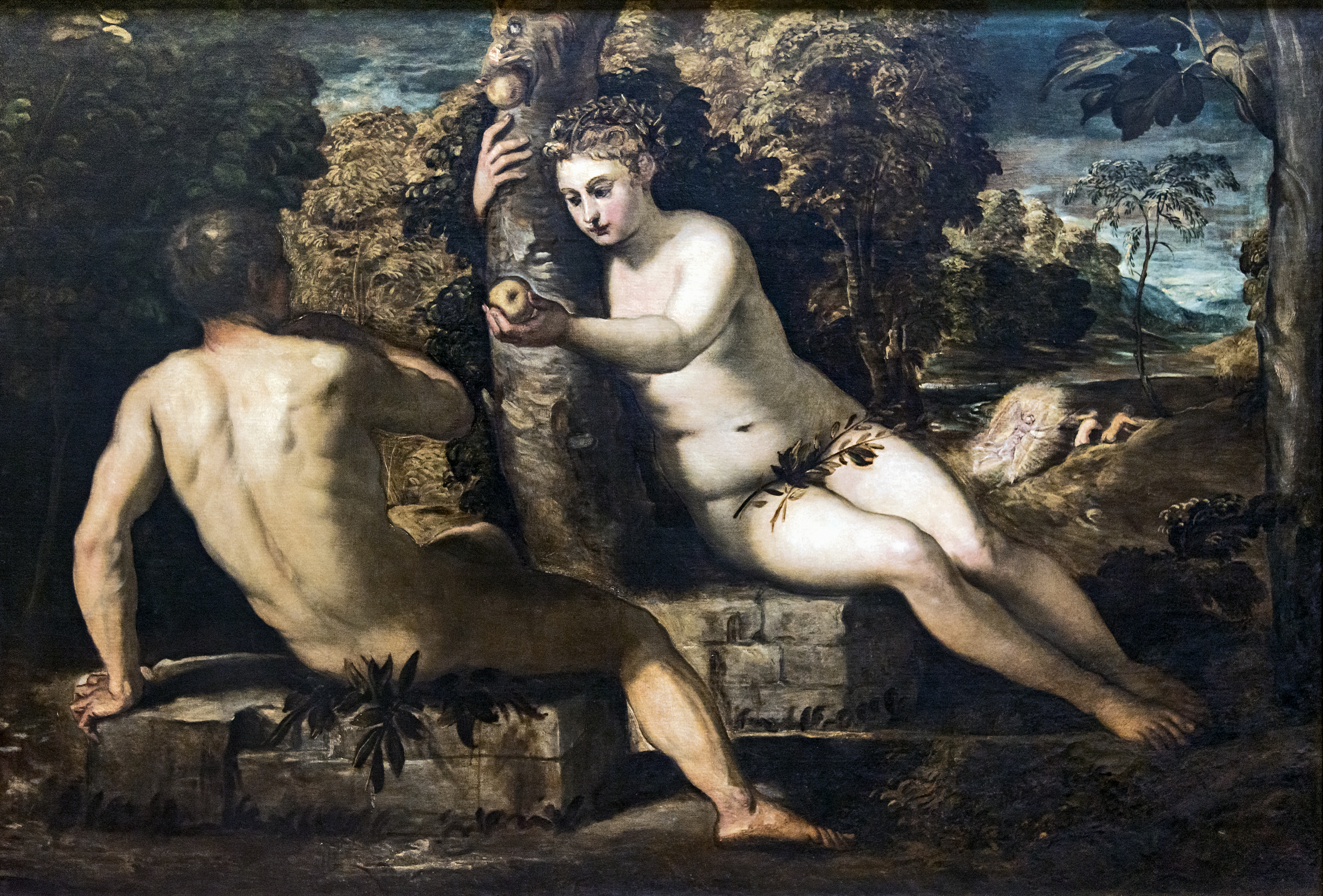
- Year: 1550–1553
- Dimensions: 150 cm × 220 cm (59 in × 87 in)
- Location: Gallerie dell'Accademia; Venice

For the Scuola della Trinità, Tintoretto painted four or five pictures depicting subjects taken from the Book of Genesis, having reference to the creation of the world; of which two are preserved untouched, and now hang on either side of Titian's Assumption in the academy at Venice. These are The Death of Abel and Adam and Eve, of which William Roscoe Osler writes:

The concentration of effect ... is marvellous without being violent. The influence of the antique sculptures is apparent in the figures, accompanied with a great knowledge of nature, and of the build of the human form. The landscapes also are most striking, not being allied to a great extent with the Titianesque landscape, but rather heralding a new poetic departure in art, such as probably had a deep effect upon Rubens, Rembrandt, and Turner. Traces may still be perceived in them of Schiavone's influence.

John Ruskin expresses his admiration in terms of enthusiasm:

Next, look on the right and left of it [Titian's Assumption], at the two dark pictures over the doors (63, 25). Darkness visible, with flashes of lightning through it. The thunder-cloud upon us, rent with fire. Those are Tintorets; finest possible Tintorets; best possible examples of what, in absolute power of painting is the supremest work, so far as I know, in all the world.

The second picture, representing Eve in the act of offering the apple to Adam, has been admired for the beauty of the flesh painting.

== Second version ==
The Fall of Man
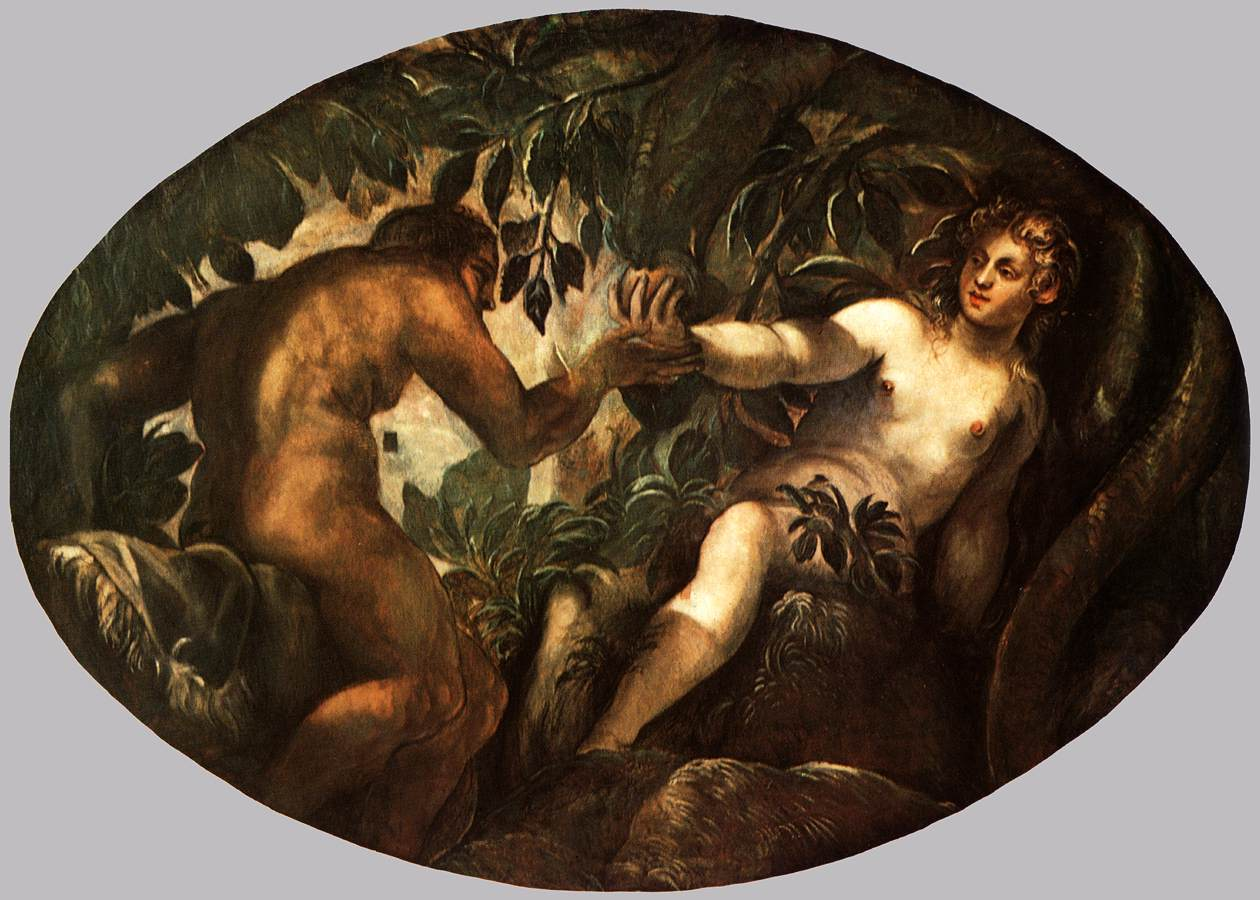
- Year: 1577–1578
- Dimensions: 265 cm × 370 cm (104 in × 150 in)
- Location: Scuola Grande di San Rocco; Venice

Tintoretto painted another version for the ceiling of the Upper Hall of the Scuola Grande di San Rocco. Ian Holbourn calls the work "sketchy but very strong"; Evelyn March Phillipps describes the painting thus:

Eve leans back in a thick mass of foliage, with a sunbeam striking athwart her white limbs. She is a ripe, voluptuous beauty, who holds out the apple to the man who, half in shade and finely modelled, is gently pushing her hand away. The branches of the apple-tree are painted with the utmost care: at the feet of Eve an evil-looking serpent glides away. This is a simply designed panel, but the oval is perfectly filled, and the lines are arranged in a sort of symmetrical pattern. The colour has the warm and ruddy glow of a typical Venetian picture. The outlines blend and mingle with the surrounding gloom, so that the arrangement is determined by alternating waves of light and shadow. It is freely and softly painted, and though it cannot compare with the rendering of the same subject in the Accademia, and does not look as if Tintoretto had given it much time or interest, it is a sensuous and emotional piece of work.

== See also ==
- Fall of man
- Original sin

== Sources ==
- Bensusan, S. L. (1908). Tintoretto. Hare, T. Leman (ed.). Masterpieces in Colour. London: T. C. & E. C. Jack; New York: Frederick A. Stokes Co. pp. 36, 69.
- Holborn, J. B. Stroughton (1907). Jacopo Robusti, Called Tintoretto. Williamson, G. C. (ed.). The Great Masters in Painting and Sculpture. London: George Bell & Sons. pp. 31, 32, 55, 101, 124, 126.
- Krischel, Roland (2000). Meister der italienischen Kunst. Tintoretto (Jacopo Tintoretto, 1519–1594). Translated by Bell, Anthea. Germany: Könemann Verlagsgesellschaft. p. 45.
- Newton, Eric (1972). Tintoretto. Westport, CT: Greenwood Press. pp. 46, 47, 78, 80, 82.
- Osler, W. Roscoe (1892). Tintoretto. Illustrated Biographies of the Great Artists. London: Sampson Low, Marston, Searle, & Rivington. pp. 24, 58, 92.
- Phillipps, Evelyn March (1911). Tintoretto. London: Methuen & Co. Ltd. pp. 44, 45, 76.
- Ruskin, John (1877). Guide to the Principal Pictures in the Academy of Fine Arts at Venice. London and Aylesbury: Hazell, Watson, and Viney. p. 10.
- Stearns, Frank Preston (1894). Life and Genius of Jacopo Robusti, Called Tintoretto. New York and London: G. P. Putnam's Sons. pp. 110, 111, 150, 163, 295.
- "The Temptation of Adam". Gallerie dell'Accademia di Venezia. 2020. Retrieved 5 August 2022.
