= Adam and Eve, Norwich =

Pub in Norwich, England

Adam and Eve
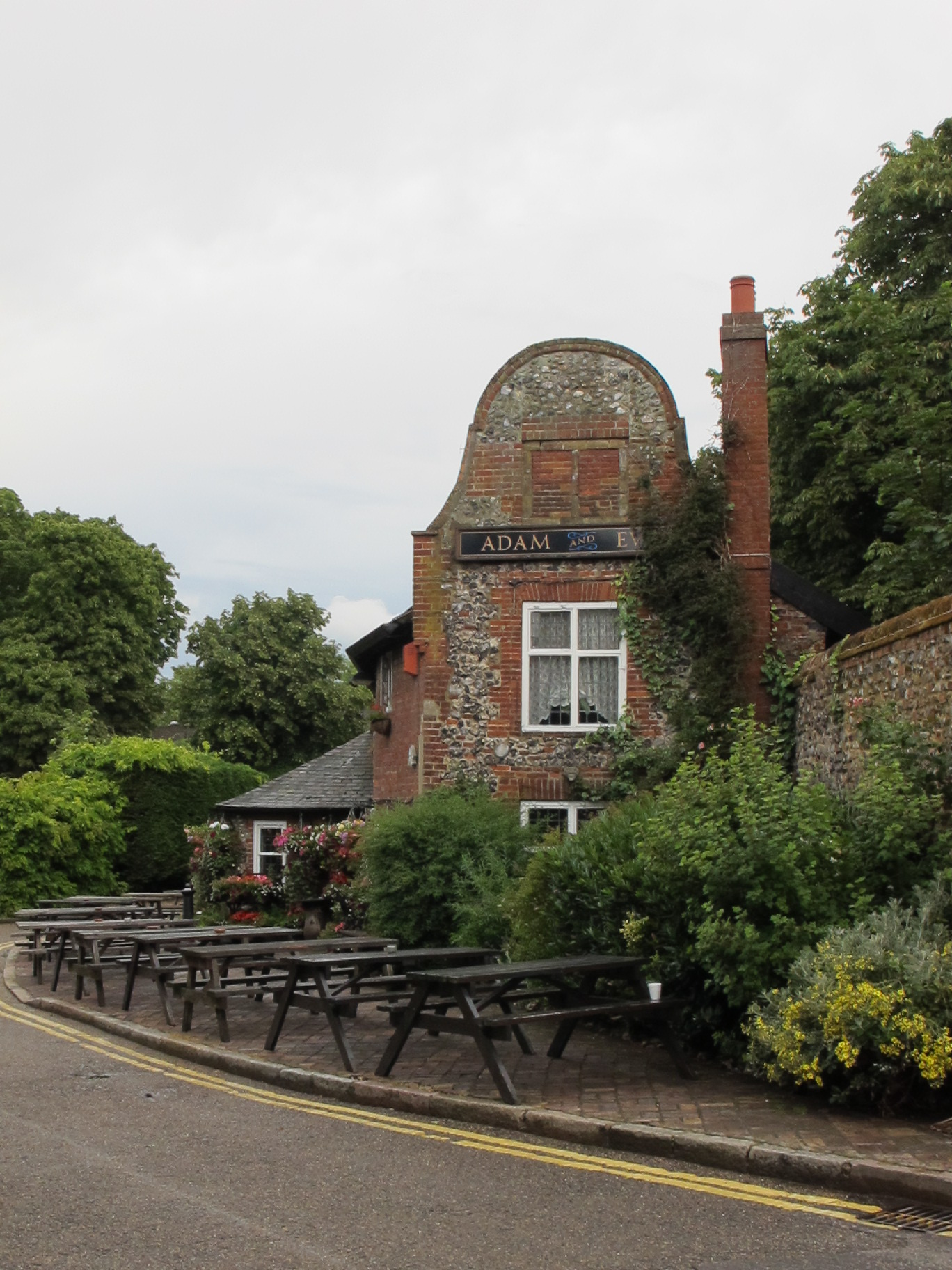
- The pub in 2011
- Interactive map of the Adam and Eve area

General information
- Location: 17 Bishopgate, Norwich, England
- Coordinates: 52.63384°N 1.30305°E

Adam and Eve is a pub in the city of Norwich, England. It is located in Bishopgate, close to Norwich Cathedral, the Great Hospital and Norwich Law Courts. It is widely claimed to be the oldest pub in the city, with the earliest known reference made in 1249.

== History ==
The earliest reference to a tavern on its site was in 1241 or 1249 as a brewhouse used by workmen building the nearby cathedral. The brewhouse was owned by Benedictine monks at the nearby Great Hospital. It was the last pub in Norwich to serve ale from the barrel, until a bar was installed in 1971.

== Building ==
The pub seen today is a 17th-century building constructed from brick and flint with later additions such as Dutch gables. A Saxon well is located beneath the lower bar floor.
