= Adam and Eve (Rodin) =

Sculpture by Auguste Rodin

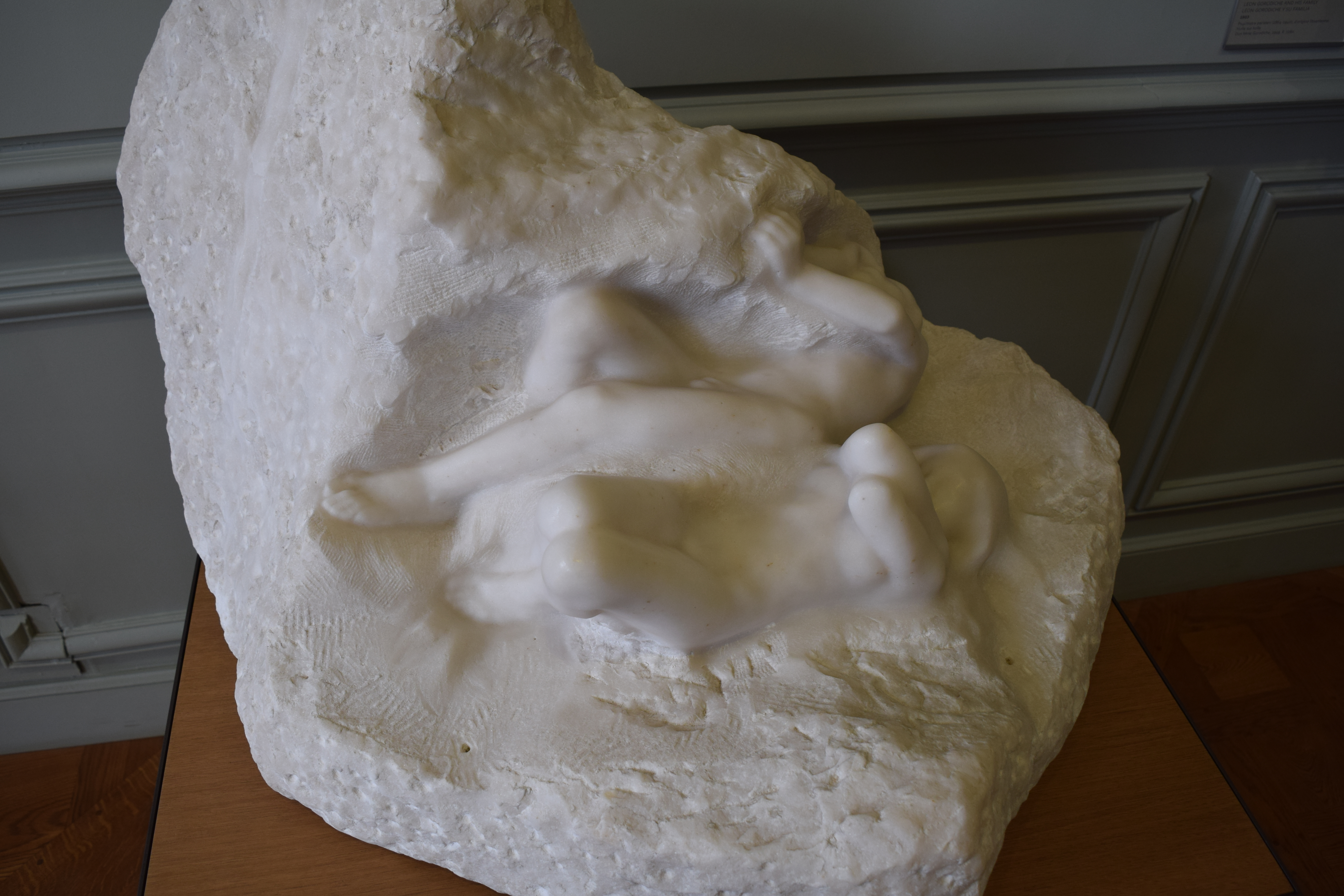
- Adam and Eve at the Musée Rodin
- Artist: Auguste Rodin
- Year: 1905
- Medium: Marble
- Location: Musée Rodin, Paris

Adam and Eve (French: Adam et Ève), also known as Adam and Eve Sleeping, is a marble sculpture by French sculptor Auguste Rodin, executed in 1905. It is held by the Musée Rodin in Paris.

The sculpture measures 50 cm in height, 84 cm in width and 56 cm in depth, and weighs 185 kg.

== See also ==
- List of sculptures by Auguste Rodin
- Young Woman with a Serpent, an 1885 sculpture by Rodin
