= Adam and Evil =

Adam and Evil may refer to:

- "Adam and Evil" (song), a song by Elvis Presley
- Adam and Evil (1927 film), a 1927 American silent film
- Adam and Evil (2004 film), a 2004 horror film
