= HMS Adam & Eve =

Two ships of the Royal Navy have borne the name HMS Adam & Eve:

- HMS Adam & Eve (1652) was a 20-gun store ship captured from the Dutch in 1652 and sold in 1657.
- HMS Adam & Eve (1665) was a 6-gun hoy captured from the Dutch in 1665 and sunk as a foundation in 1673.
