= Adam and Eve (play) =

1931 Russian play by Mikhail Bulgakov

- Written by: Mikhail Bulgakov
- Original language: Russian
- Subject: Chemical warfare, Communism, USSR
- Genre: Apocalyptic science fiction drama

Premiere

Adam and Eve (Russian: Адам и Ева) is a four-act play by Mikhail Bulgakov. Written in 1931, the play is set in future Leningrad, where chemical warfare is the main weapon of mass destruction, and has destroyed most of the world.

== Plot ==
Eva Voikevich and Adam Krasovsky, a newlywed couple, meet Alexander Efrosimov, a scientist, who has invented a machine to protect the human body from toxic elements. Shortly thereafter, a fallout of chemical warfare occurs in the USSR and most of the population of the city perishes. The newlyweds and Efrosimov form a group with three other survivors ─ ace pilot Andrey Daragan, writer Donut-Nepobeda, and Zakhar Marquizov, an expelled trade union member, and retreat into the wilderness.

== History ==
Bulgakov was commissioned to make a play about a 'future war' by the Leningrad Krasniy Theater. He began writing the play in June 1931 and completed it on 22 August. Bulgakov explained in a letter to Konstantin Stanislavsky that he had offered the play to the Vakhtanagov Theater, as well as others, but not the Moscow Art Theater, because the latter contained a clause in which Bulgakov would have to return his advance payment if the play was banned before production, and mentioned that there was no such clause with other theaters associated with the production of his play. Such an absence of financial pressure is possibly why the play is absent of self-censorship and more abundant in open critiques of the Soviet government. Nonetheless, the play was read by Yakov Alksnis, commander of the Soviet Air Force, who prohibited the play from being staged. Bulgakov wrote a second edition of the play, but it was not staged either. The play was first staged in 1971 in Paris, and returned to the USSR in 1987.

== Characters ==
- Eva Voikevich
- Adam Nikolaevich Krasovsky, engineer
- Alexander Ippolitovich Efrosimov, scientist
- Andrey Fedorovich Daragan, ace pilot
- Donut-Nepobeda, writer
- Zakhar Sevastyannovich Marquizov, ex-trade union member
- Anya, housekeeper

== Sources ==
- Curtis, J.A.E. 2017. Critical Lives: Mikhail Bulgakov United Kingdom: Reaktion Books. ISBN 978-1-78023-741-1
- Milne, Lesley. 1991. Bulgakov Six Plays. United Kingdom: Methuen World Dramatists. ISBN 0-413-64530-4

== See also ==
- Bolshoi Theatre
- Russian literature
