= Adam and Eve and Pinch Me =

Adam and Eve and Pinch Me may refer to:

- Adam and Eve and Pinch Me, 1921 short story collection by A. E. Coppard
- Adam and Eve and Pinch-Me (Johnston novel), a 1994 novel by Julie Johnston
- Adam and Eve and Pinch Me (Rendell novel), a 2001 novel by Ruth Rendell
