= Adam and Eve cylinder seal =

Ancient cylinder seal

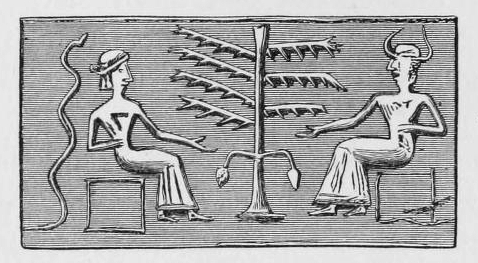
- Drawing of the seal's impression, by George Smith
- Material: Greenstone
- Size: h x d: 2.71 cm (1.07 in) x 1.65 cm (0.65 in)
- Created: 22nd century BC
- Present location: British Museum
- Identification: 1846,0523.347

The Adam and Eve cylinder seal, also known as the "temptation seal", is a small stone cylinder of post-Akkadian origin, dating from about 2200 to 2100 BC. The seal depicts two seated figures, a tree, and a serpent, and was formerly believed to evince some connection with Adam and Eve from the Book of Genesis. It is now seen as a conventional example of an Akkadian banquet scene.

== History ==
Cylinder seals are small cylinders, usually made of stone and pierced from end-to-end. They are designed to be worn on a string or on a pin.

Designs are carved into the surface of cylinders seals in intaglio, so that when rolled on clay, the cylinder leaves a continuous imprint of the design, reversed and in relief. Cylinder seals originate from southern Mesopotamia (now Iraq or south-western Iran). They were invented around 3500 BC, and were used as an administrative tool, as magical amulets and as jewellery until around 300 BC. They are linked to the invention of cuneiform writing on clay; when this spread to other areas of the Near East, the use of cylinder seals spread as well.

Assyriologist George Smith described the Adam and Eve seal as having two figures (male and female) on each side of a tree, holding out their hands to the fruit, while between the backs of the figures is a serpent, which he saw as evidence that the Fall of Man legend was known in early times of Babylonia.

== Description ==
According to Dominque Collon, the seal shows a common scene found on seals from the twenty-third and twenty-second centuries BC: a seated male figure (identified by his head-dress of horns as a god) facing a female worshipper. The date palm and snake between them may merely be symbolic of fertility. This view is backed by David Petersen, who writes that:

Collon rightly maintains that this particular seal belongs in the well-established tradition of the Akkadian banquet scene. In order to prove her case, she points to several features in the so-called Adam and Eve seal that may be found in contemporary images. First, there is a long tradition in Mesopotamian art of representing figures facing a central plant, here a date palm. Also, the horns of the seated figure on the right indicate divine status, in accordance with long-held iconographic conventions. The figure on the left is probably a worshipper and not a woman at all, as Fradenburgh assumed. As for the snake, it may well be a representation of a snake-god (such as Nirah) or possibly a more general symbol of regeneration and fertility.

The professor in comparative mythology and comparative religion Joseph Campbell sees in it a cult that has probably emerged and developed in the Neolithic period presenting the mother goddess associated with the Tree of Life and the serpent. He writes:

Hence the early Sumerian seal figure cannot possibly be, as some scholars have supposed, the representation of a lost Sumerian version of the Fall of Adam and Eve. Its sprits is that of the idyll in the much earlier, Bronze Age view of the garden of innocence, where the two desirable fruits of the mythic date palm are to be culled: the fruit of enlightenment and the fruit of immortal life. The female figure on the left, before the serpent, is almost certainly the goddess Gula-Bau (a counterpart, as we have said of Demeter and Persephone), while the male on the right, who is not mortal but a god, as we know from his horned lunar crown, is no less surely his beloved son-husband Dumuzi, Son of the Abyss: Lord of the Tree of Life [...].
