= 1644 in art =

Events from the year 1644 in art.

== Events ==
- Nicolas Poussin begins to paint the second series of Seven Sacraments.

== Works ==
=== Paintings ===
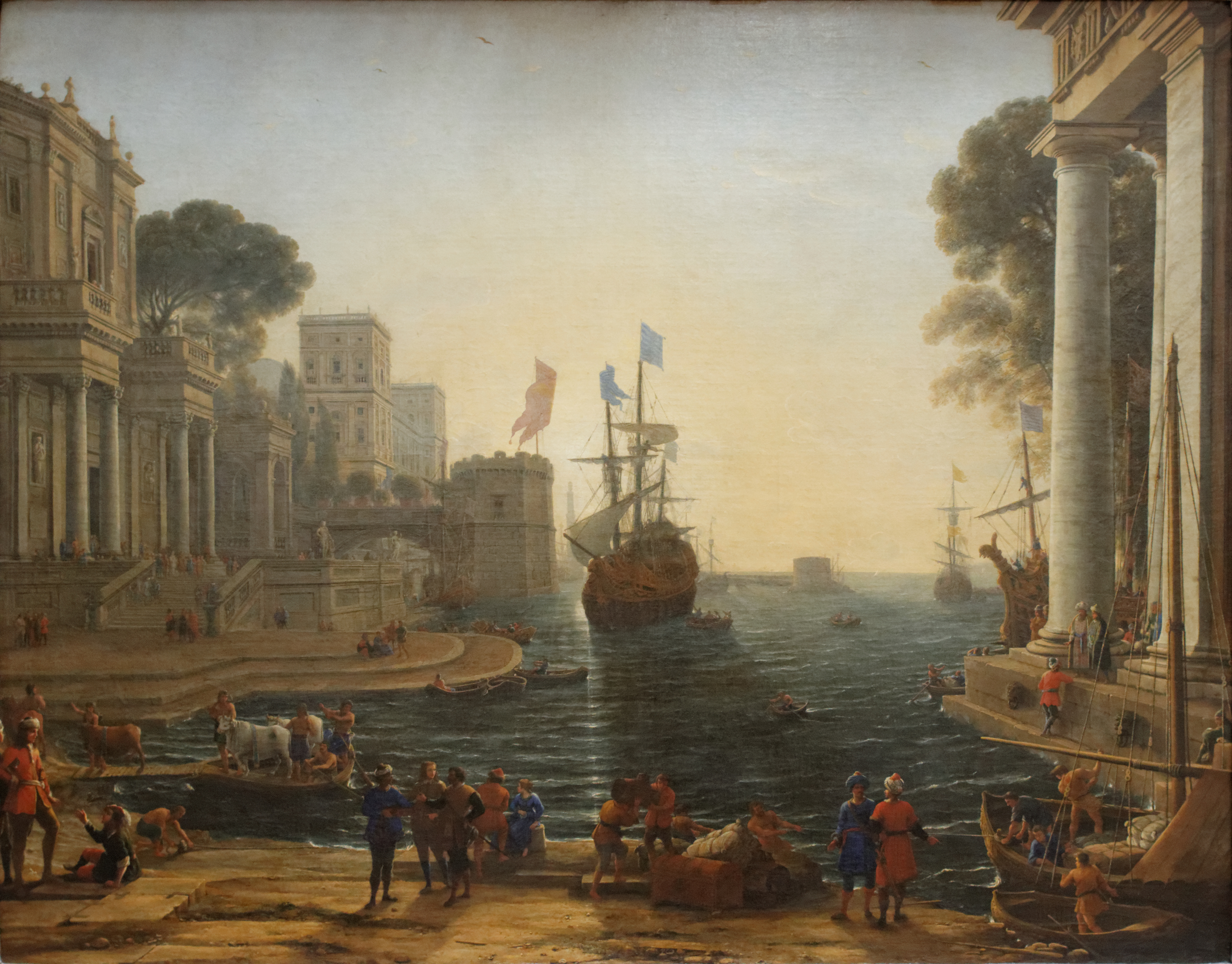
Claude, Odysseus Returns Chryseis

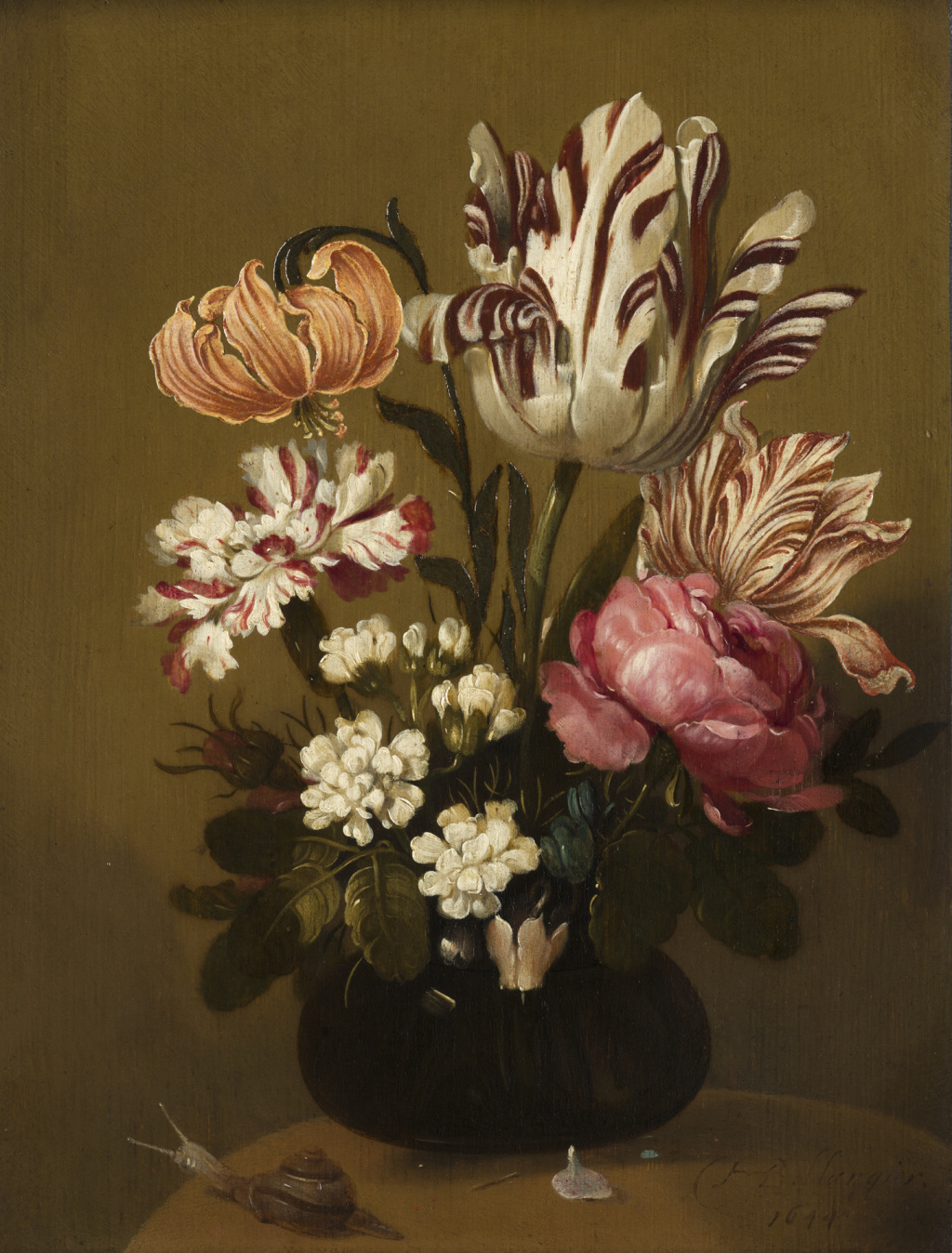
Bollongier, Blumenstück
- Hans Gillisz. Bollongier – Blumenstück ("Piece of Flower")
- Claude Lorrain
  - Odysseus Returns Chryseis to Her Father
  - Pastoral Landscape with the Arch of Titus
  - View of Tivoli at Sunset
- William Dobson – John, 1st Baron Byron (approximate date)
- Sebastian Stoskopff – Glasses in a Basket
- David Teniers the Younger – The Smokers
- Diego Velázquez – Coronation of the Virgin

=== Sculpture ===
- Alessandro Algardi – Tomb of Pope Leo XI

== Births ==
- April - Abraham Storck, Dutch landscape and maritime painter of the Baroque era (died 1708)
- date unknown
  - Étienne Allegrain, French topographical painter (died 1736)
  - Francisco Antolínez, Spanish historical and landscape painter (died 1700)
  - Domenico Bettini, Italian painter of still lifes (d. unknown)
  - Jacob van Huchtenburg, Dutch painter (died 1675)
  - Yang Jin, Chinese painter during the Qing Dynasty (died 1728)
  - Simon Pietersz Verelst, Dutch Golden Age painter (died 1710)
- date unknown - Pietro Erardi, Maltese chaplain and painter (died 1727)
- probable
  - Marziale Carpinoni, Italian painter of the Baroque period (died 1722)
  - Elizabeth Haselwood English silversmith (died 1715)

== Deaths ==
- January 20 – Stefano Amadei, Italian still-life painter (born 1580)
- February – Johannes van der Beeck, Dutch painter (born 1589)
- May 11 - Domingos da Cunha, Portuguese painter (born 1598)
- June 14 - Jean Toutin, French enamel worker, one of the first artists to make enamel portrait miniatures (born 1578)
- July 16 – Giovanni Biliverti, Italian Mannerist painter (born 1585)
- August 2 – Bernardo Strozzi, Italian painter (born 1581)
- November 27 – Francisco Pacheco, Spanish painter and writer on painting (born 1564)
- date unknown
  - Giovanni Maria Bottala, Italian painter (born 1613)
  - Giovanni Battista Calandra, Italian mosaic artist (born 1568)
  - George Jamesone, Scottish portrait painter (born 1587)
  - Ni Yuanlu, Chinese calligrapher and painter during the Ming Dynasty (born 1593)
  - Claudio Ridolfi, Italian painter (born 1560)
  - Bernard van Linge, Dutch glass and enamel painter (born 1598)
  - Cui Zizhong, Chinese painter during the Ming Dynasty (born unknown)
