= 1578 in art =

List of years in art	(table)
- … 1568; 1569; 1570; 1571; 1572; 1573; 1574; 1575; 1576; 1577; 1578; 1579; 1580; 1581; 1582; 1583; 1584; 1585; 1586; 1587; 1588 …
- Art; Archaeology; Architecture; Literature; Music; Philosophy; Science; +...

Events from the year 1578 in art.

== Events ==
- March 8 - On the death of Elisabeth of Brandenburg-Küstrin, her husband, Margrave George Frederick I of Brandenburg-Ansbach-Kulmbach commissions a monument by Willem van Bloche.

== Works ==
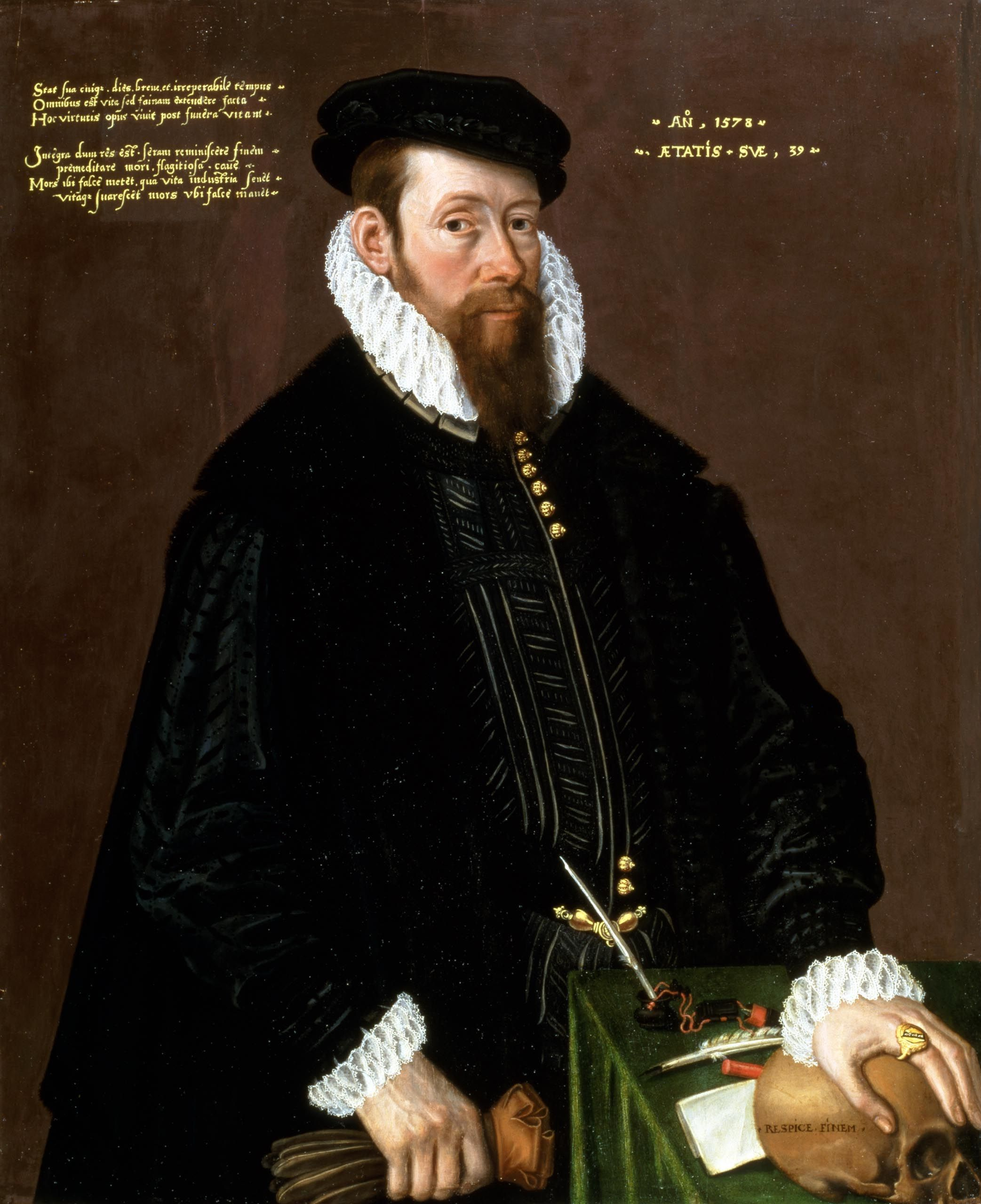
Thomas Pead by Cornelis Ketel

- George Gower – Lady Philippa Coningsby
- Cornelis Ketel – Portraits
  - Richard Goodricke of Ribston
  - Thomas Pead

== Births ==
- March 17 – Francesco Albani, Italian painter (died 1660)
- August 10 – Matteo Rosselli, Italian painter of historical paintings in the late Florentine and early Baroque (died 1650)
- October 12 – Baldassare Aloisi, Italian portrait painter and engraver (died 1638)
- date unknown
  - Jan Baptist Barbé, Flemish engraver (died 1649)
  - Battistello Caracciolo, Italian painter (died 1635)
  - Agostino Ciampelli, Italian fresco painter (died 1640)
  - Adam Elsheimer, German "cabinet" painter (died 1610)
  - Fede Galizia, Italian still life painter (died 1630)
  - Ottavio Leoni, Italian painter and printmaker (died 1630)
  - Francisco Lopez Caro, Spanish painter (died 1662)
  - Bartolomeo Schedoni, Italian painter (died 1615)
  - Jean Toutin, French enamel worker, one of the first artists to make enamel portrait miniatures (died 1644)
  - Alessandro Turchi, Italian painter (died 1649)
  - Hieronymus Francken II, Flemish painter (d. unknown)
  - Francesco Stringa, Italian court painter for Duke Ranuccio I Farnese (died 1615)
- probable
  - Guy François, French painter (died 1650)
  - Iwasa Matabei, Japanese painter (died 1650)
  - Pieter Neeffs I, Flemish Baroque painter who specialized in architectural interiors of churches (died 1656)
  - Gerrit van Bloclant, Dutch Renaissance painter (died 1650)

== Deaths ==
- January 5 – Giulio Clovio, Croatian illustrator and miniaturist (born 1498)
- February 5 – Giovanni Battista Moroni, Italian Mannerist painter (born 1520/1524)
- March 17 - Cornelis Cort, Dutch engraver and draughtsman (born 1533)
- August 28 - Giovanni Battista Zelotti, Italian painter (born 1526)
- October 13 - Jean Bullant, French sculptor and architect (born 1515)
- Date unknown
  - Pierre Lamo, Italian history painter
  - Bernardino Lanini, Italian Renaissance painter active mainly in Milan (born 1511) (probable date)
  - Benedetto Pagni, Italian painter
  - Qian Gu, Chinese landscape painter during the Ming Dynasty (born c.1508) (approximate date)
  - Raffaellino da Reggio, Italian Mannerist painter (born 1550)
