= 1511 in art =

Events from the year 1511 in art.

== Events ==
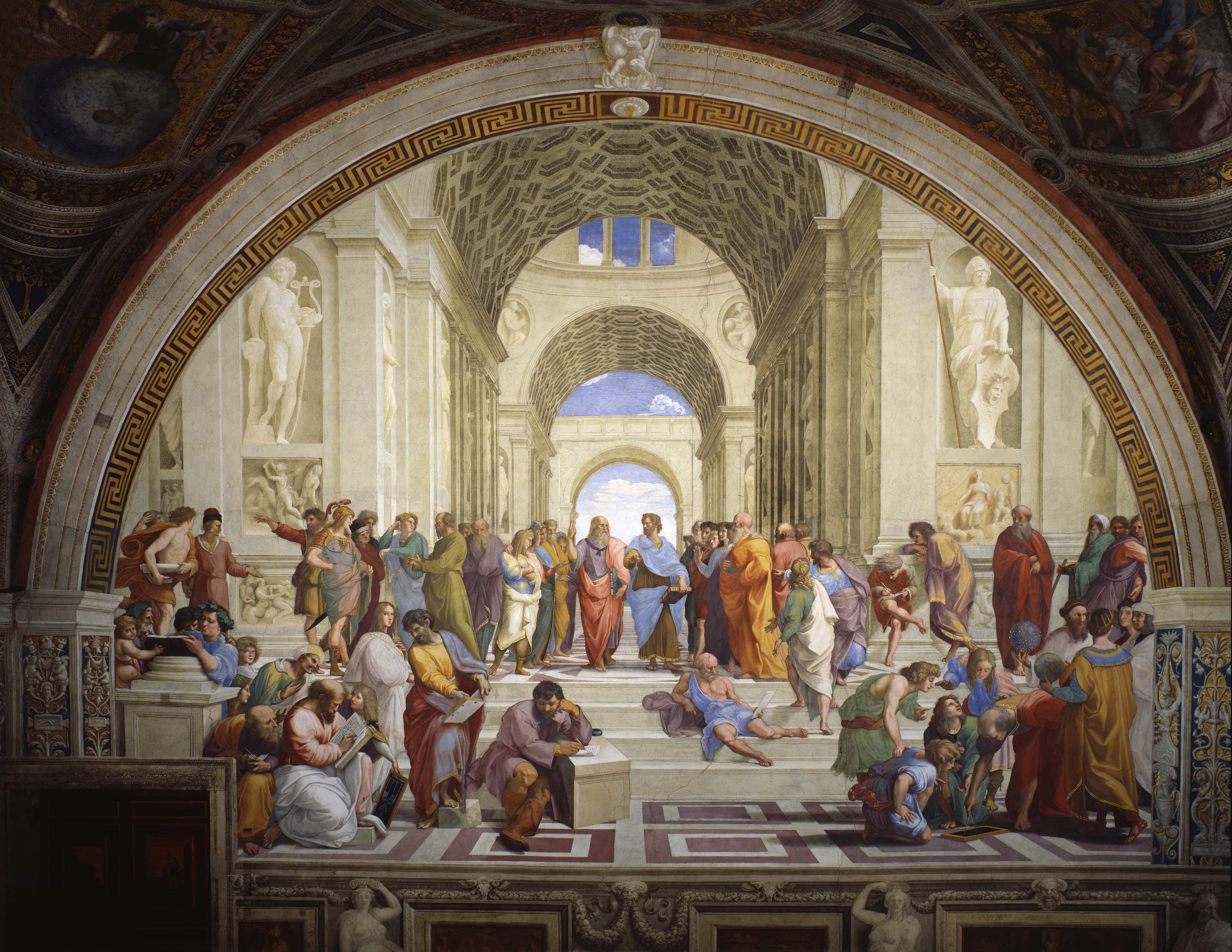
Raphael, The School of Athens, 1511, Vatican City, Apostolic Palace

- Albrecht Dürer publishes his woodcut series "Life of the Virgin", the "Great Passion" and "Little Passion".
- Michelangelo's 1508 bronze statue of Pope Julius II in San Petronio Basilica, Bologna is destroyed.
- The Miracle of 1511, a festival in Brussels in which the locals built approximately 110 satirical snowmen.

=== Painting ===
- Albrecht Dürer – Adoration of the Trinity (Landauer Altarpiece)
- Matthias Grünewald – The Small Crucifixion
- Michelangelo – The Creation of the Sun, Moon and Planets
- Raphael
  - Frescoes in Raphael Rooms of Apostolic Palace in Rome
    - Cardinal and Theological Virtues
    - The Parnassus
    - The School of Athens
  - Madonna of Foligno
  - Madonna of Loreto
  - Portrait of Cardinal Alessandro Farnese
  - Portrait of Pope Julius II
- Titian
  - The Gypsy Madonna
  - Miracle of the Jealous Husband (fresco, Scuola del Santo, Padua)
  - The Miracle of the Speaking Babe
  - St. Mark Enthroned (1510 or 1511; Santa Maria della Salute, Venice)

=== Sculpture ===
- Adam Dircksz (attrib.) – Miniature altarpiece (British Museum, London, WB.232)

== Births ==
- Bartolomeo Ammanati, architect and sculptor (died 1592)
- Camillo Boccaccino, Italian painter active mainly in Cremona and regions of Lombardy (died 1546)
- Jean Court, enamel painter (died 1583)
- Zhang Han, Chinese scholar-official, literary author, painter, and essayist (died 1593)
- Bernardino Lanini, Italian Renaissance painter active mainly in Milan (died 1578)
- Lelio Orsi, Italian Renaissance painter of the Reggio Emilia school (died 1587)
- Giorgio Vasari, Italian painter and architect, who is today famous for his biographies of Italian artists (died 1574)

== Deaths ==
- Simón de Colonia, Spanish architect and sculptor (b. unknown)
- Raimo Epifanio Tesauro, Italian Renaissance painter specializing in frescoes (born 1480)
