= Zhang Han =

Zhang Han may refer to the following people surnamed Zhang:

- Zhang Han (Qin dynasty) (?–205 BC), Qin dynasty general
- Zhang Han (Ming dynasty) (1511–1593), Ming dynasty scholar and official
- Hans Zhang (born 1984), Chinese actor, singer and host
- Chang Han (born 1985), Taiwanese football player
- Zhang Jiying (given name Zhang Han), Chinese statesman of late three kingdom period and Jin dynasty

== See also ==
- Han Zhang, a fictional character from the novel The Seven Heroes and Five Gallants, surnamed Han
