= 1593 in art =

Events from the year 1593 in art.

== Events ==
- (unknown)

== Paintings ==
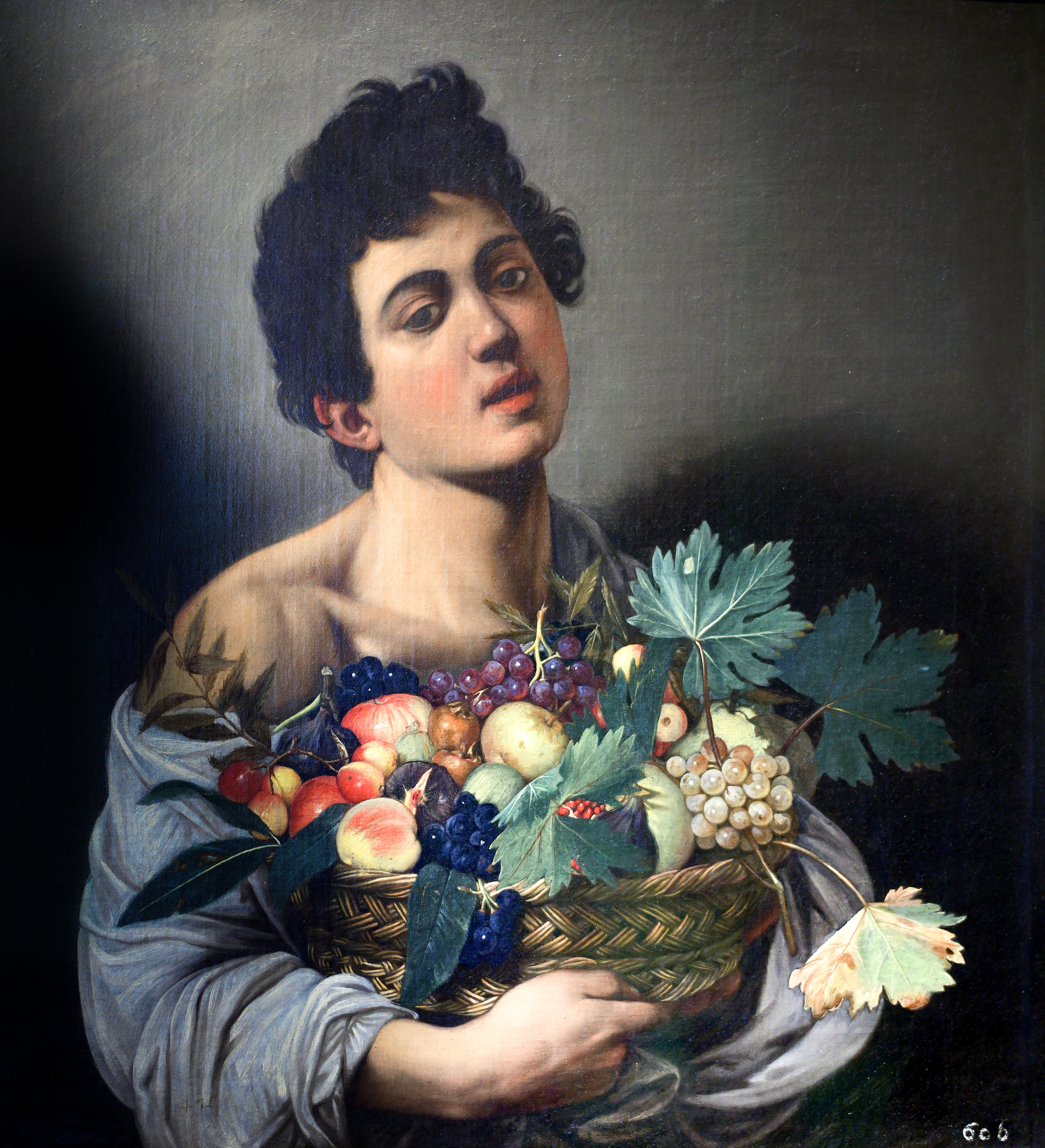
Caravaggio, Boy with a Basket of Fruit, 1593

- Caravaggio – Boy with a Basket of Fruit
- Santi di Tito – Vision of St Thomas Aquinas
- Cornelis van Haarlem – The Wedding of Peleus and Thetis
- Hans von Aachen – Pallas Athena, Venus and Juno
- Rowland Lockey- Sir Thomas More and Family
- Streatham portrait

== Births ==
- March 13 - Georges de La Tour, painter from the Duchy of Lorraine, now in France (died 1652)
- May 19 - Jacob Jordaens, Flemish Baroque painter from the Antwerp school of painting (died 1678)
- July 8 - Artemisia Gentileschi, Italian Baroque painter (d. c.1654)
- September 22 - Matthäus Merian, Swiss engraver (died 1650)
- October - Cornelis Janssens van Ceulen, Dutch portrait painter (died 1661)
- December 23 - Ercole Sarti, Italian deaf painter, active in Ferrara (d. unknown)
- date unknown
  - Giovanni Battista Barbiani, Italian painter (died 1650)
  - Willem van Haecht, Flemish painter (died 1637)
  - Balthasar van der Ast, Dutch Golden Age painter who specialized in still lifes of flowers and fruit (died 1657)
  - Jan van de Velde, Dutch School painter and engraver of animal, landscape and still-life subjects (died 1641)
- probable
  - Louis Le Nain, French painter of the Le Nain family of painters (died 1648)
  - Ni Yuanlu, Chinese calligrapher and painter during the Ming Dynasty (died 1644)
  - Balthasar van der Ast, Dutch painter who specialized in still lifes of flowers and fruit (died 1657)
  - 1593/1601: Pieter Soutman, Dutch Golden Age painter (died 1657)

== Deaths ==
- July 11 - Giuseppe Arcimboldo, Italian painter best known for creating portrait heads made entirely of such objects as fruits, vegetables, and flowers (born 1527)
- November 20 - Hans Bol, Flemish painter (born 1534)
- November 30 - Niccolò Granello, Italian fresco painter established in Spain (born 1553)
- date unknown
  - Claudio de Arciniega, Spanish sculptor and architect (born 1520)
  - Giovanni Paolo Lolmo, Italian painter (born 1550)
  - Zhang Han, Chinese scholar-official, literary author, painter, and essayist (born 1511)
  - Xu Wei, Ming Dynasty Chinese painter, poet and dramatist (born 1521)
- probable - Jean Cousin the Elder, French painter, sculptor, etcher, engraver, and geometrician (born 1500)
