= Petitot =

Petitot may refer to:

- Émile Petitot (1838–1916), French Missionary Oblate, and Canadian northwest cartographer, ethnologist, geographer, linguist, and writer
  - Petitot River, in northern Alberta and British Columbia, Canada, named in honor of Émile Petitot
- Jean Petitot (1607–1691), Genevan enamel painter
- Jean Petitot (1653–1702), Genevan and French enamel painter; eldest son of Jean Petitot
- Louis Petitot (1794–1862), French sculptor
- Ennemond Alexandre Petitot (1727–1801), French architect active in Parma, Italy

== See also ==
- Petiteau
