= Lamo =

Lamo is a surname of Italian origin that may refer to:

- Adrian Lamo (1981–2018), American threat analyst
- Augusto Lamo Castillo (1938–2002), Spanish football referee
- Pierre Lamo (died 1578), Italian painter
- Regina de Lamo (1870–1947), Spanish writer, journalist, musician, and teacher

== See also ==
- Lhamo
