= Zhang Jiying =

Zhang Han (Chinese: 張翰), courtesy name Jiying (季鷹), was a Chinese statesman of late three kingdom period and Jin Dynasty. He was best known for his literary works and an incident related to roughskin sculpin. Some of Zhang's works were included in Wen Xuan.

Jiying came from Wu Commandery (around present-day Suzhou, Jiangsu). His clan, Zhang clan of Wu, was one of the four most influential clans in Wu Commandery. His father Zhang Yan was a high rank official of Eastern Wu. During the War of the Eight Princes, Prince Qi Sima Jiong appointed him but Zhang abandoned his duty when he felt nostalgic about roughskin sculpin, a common food in the region where he came from. He explained himself by saying "In one's life, fulfilling his will is important. How can one stay at a place far from home for the sake of vainglory?" He was then ostracized for abandoning his position. Soon, prince Qi died while fighting with other princes. Since Zhang escaped before the death of prince Qi, people started to praise him for being "wise".

Zhang Jiying died in Wu Commandery when he was 57. He never changed his nonchalant lifestyle and strongly despised fame and vainglory.

In the 29th volume of Wen Xuan, 3 of Zhang's poems were included.

Zhang's unique philosophy and his scornful attitude towards glory and fame made him a popular historical figure among the Chinese poets. Li Bai, one of the most famous poet of China, admired Zhang and praised him in at least three poems. Other poets such as Liu Zhangqing, Du Mu, and Luo Yin also mentioned Zhang by citing his story and roughskin sculpin.
