= Jean Toutin =

French enamelworker

- Born: 1578; Châteaudun
- Died: 14 June 1644; Paris

Jean Toutin (1578 – June 14, 1644) was a French enamelworker who was one of the first artists to make enamel portrait miniatures. He was born at Châteaudun which was at the time in the province of Anjou. His technique was used by Jean Petitot and his son Jean Louis Petitot, as well as by Pierre Signac and Charles Boit.
