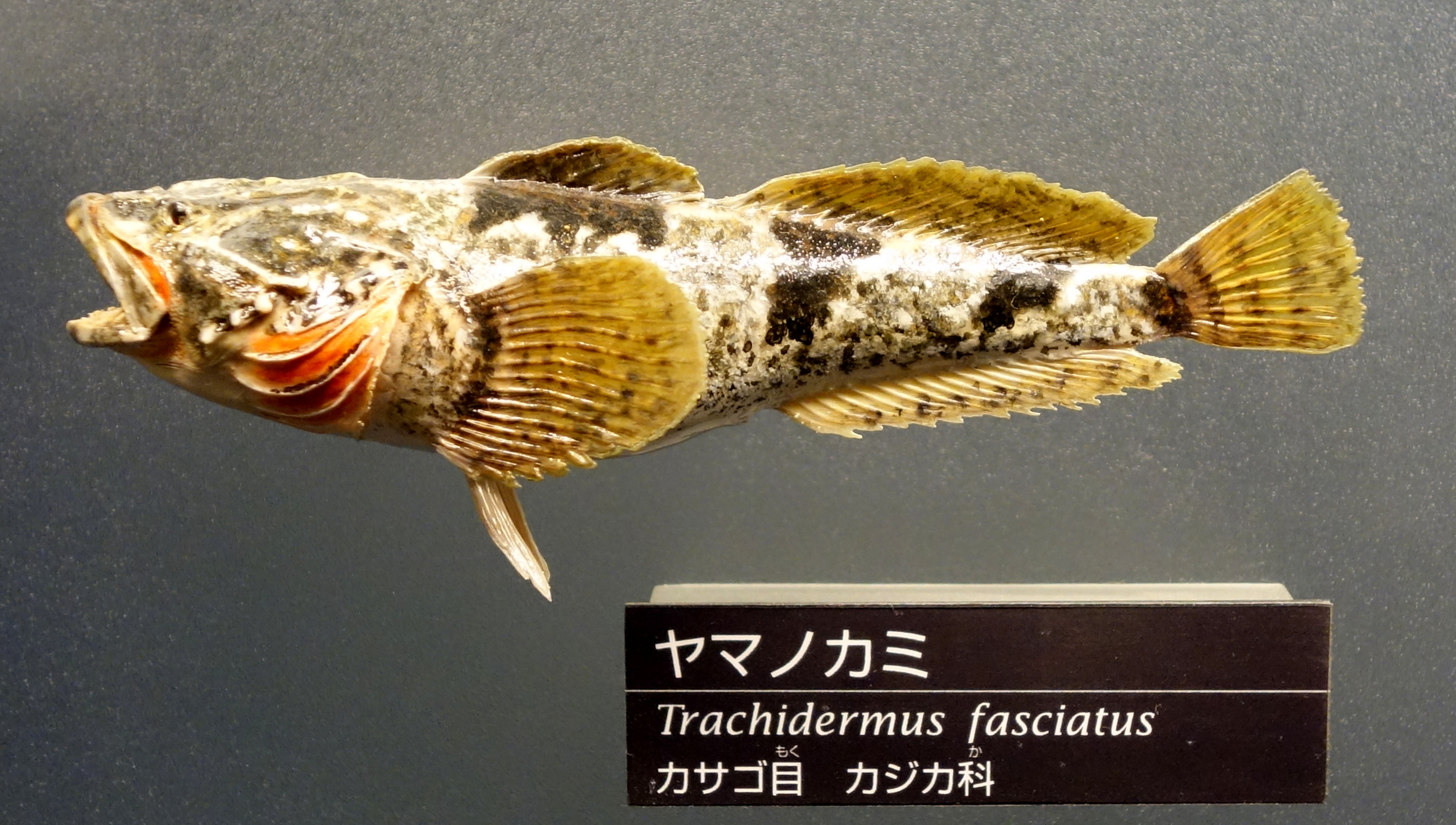

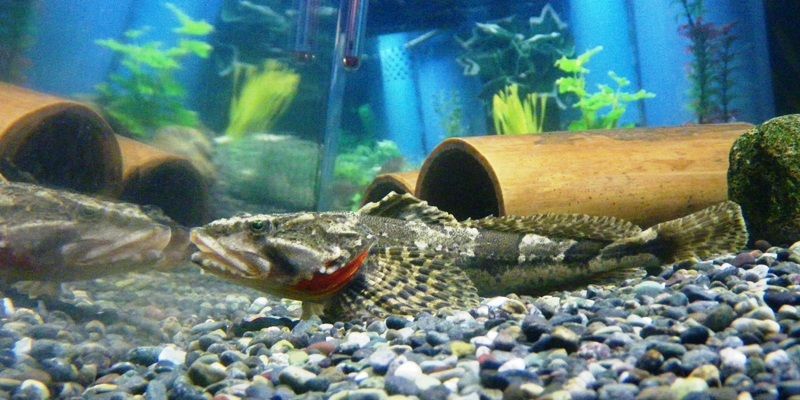
- Museum specimen (above), Individual in an aquarium (below)

Conservation status
- Least Concern (IUCN 3.1)

Scientific classification
- Kingdom: Animalia
- Phylum: Chordata
- Class: Actinopterygii
- Order: Perciformes
- Suborder: Cottoidei
- Superfamily: Cottoidea
- Family: Cottidae
- Genus: Trachidermus; Heckel, 1837
- Species: T. fasciatus

Binomial name
- Trachidermus fasciatus Heckel, 1837

= Roughskin sculpin =

Species of fish

Trachidermus fasciatus is a species of fish in the superfamily Cottoidea, the sculpins, and the only member of the monotypic genus Trachidermus. Its common name is roughskin sculpin. It has also been called four-gilled perch. It is native to the coastlines of China, Japan, and Korea, where it occurs at the mouths of rivers.

== Description ==
This species is up to about 20 cm (8 in) long and weighs up to 350 g (12 oz). It has a large, spineless head with a wide mouth and small eyes near the tip of the snout. The upper jaw is slightly projecting. The dorsal fin has 8 spines and 19 to 20 soft rays and the anal fin has no spines but 17 to 18 soft rays. This fish lacks scales but its body surface is textured with knobbles. The gill opening is large and each gill has two orange stripes.

This fish lives in rivers, estuaries, and coastal ocean waters. It is catadromous; adults spawn on mudflats at the river mouths, and after hatching, the juveniles swim upstream to freshwater river habitat.

== Breeding ==
The female often lays eggs in empty bivalve shells. Nests have been noted in the shells of the oyster Crassostrea rivularis and the clam Atrina pectinata. It will also use other readily available structures for nesting, such as concrete blocks, lengths of bamboo, or glass bottles. The male often guards the nest. The eggs are reddish-yellow to tangerine in color, about 2 mm (0.08 in) in width, and sticky in texture, adhering to the shell or other nest material. The larval fish is about 7 mm (0.3 in) long at hatching.

== Feeding ==
This species is a bottom-dwelling fish and is a predator. The adult feeds on small fish and shrimps. The juveniles feed on zooplankton, such as rotifers. In the Ariake Sea of Japan the juveniles show a clear preference for the calanoid copepod species Sinocalanus sinensis. Juveniles have been reared in the laboratory on diets of midge larvae, water fleas, and the brine shrimp Artemia salina.

== Status ==
The habitat of the fish is degraded in some areas, particularly the river mouths of coastal China. Pollution from rapid urban development, overfishing, and the construction of dams and dikes threaten the species in this region. Changes in the hydrology of the area, mainly from dams, are most concerning because they prevent the migration of the fish in the river systems.
