= Guy François (painter) =

French painter

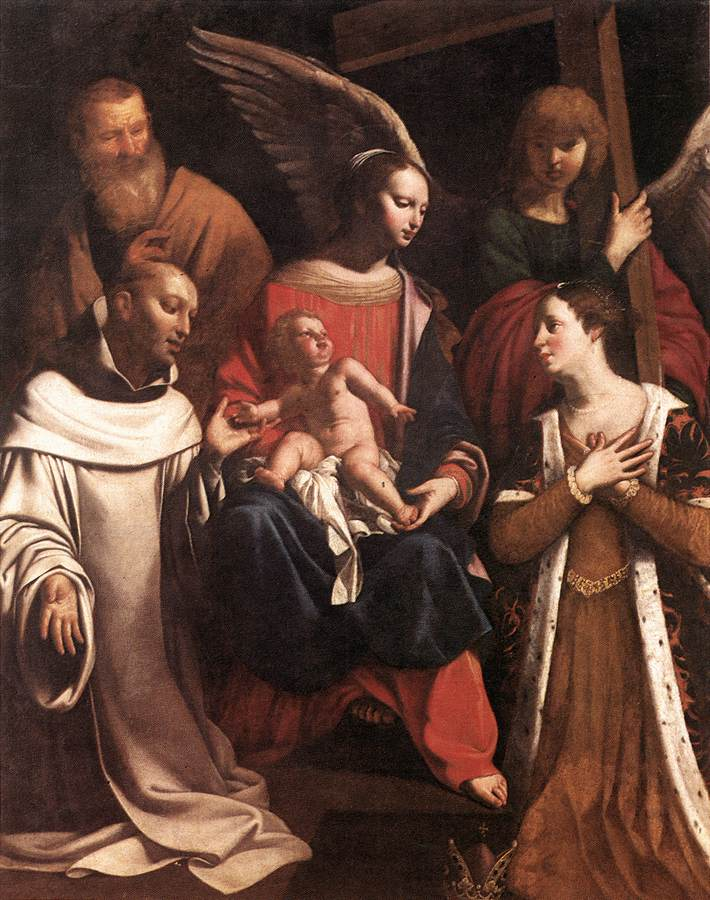
Holy family with St. Bruno and St. Helen

Guy François (1578 – 1650) was a French painter.

== Biography ==
He was born in Le Puy and travelled to Italy, where he worked in the workshop of Carlo Saraceni in Venice during the years 1615–1619. He signed his works "Guido Francesco". He is known for religious works in the style of Caravaggio.

He died in Le Puy-en-Velay.

== Bibliography ==
- Guy François on Artnet
