= Gerrit van Bloclant =

Dutch Renaissance painter

Gerrit van Bloclant (ca. 1578 – ca. 1650) was a Dutch Renaissance painter.

Not much is known about Gerrit van Bloclant's life except through his works. His name suggest he may have come from the village of Blokland, South Holland or Blokland, Utrecht. He primarily painted still lifes of flowers, and displayed his skills in representing with exactness the colors, shapes and textures. The realism utilized helped contribute to botanical studies in the Netherlands. One work executed by Gerrit van Bloclant Flower-Piece is part of the National Inventory of Continental European Paintings collection.
