= Miniature altarpiece (WB.232) =

1511 Gothic boxwood miniature sculpture

Miniature boxwood altarpiece
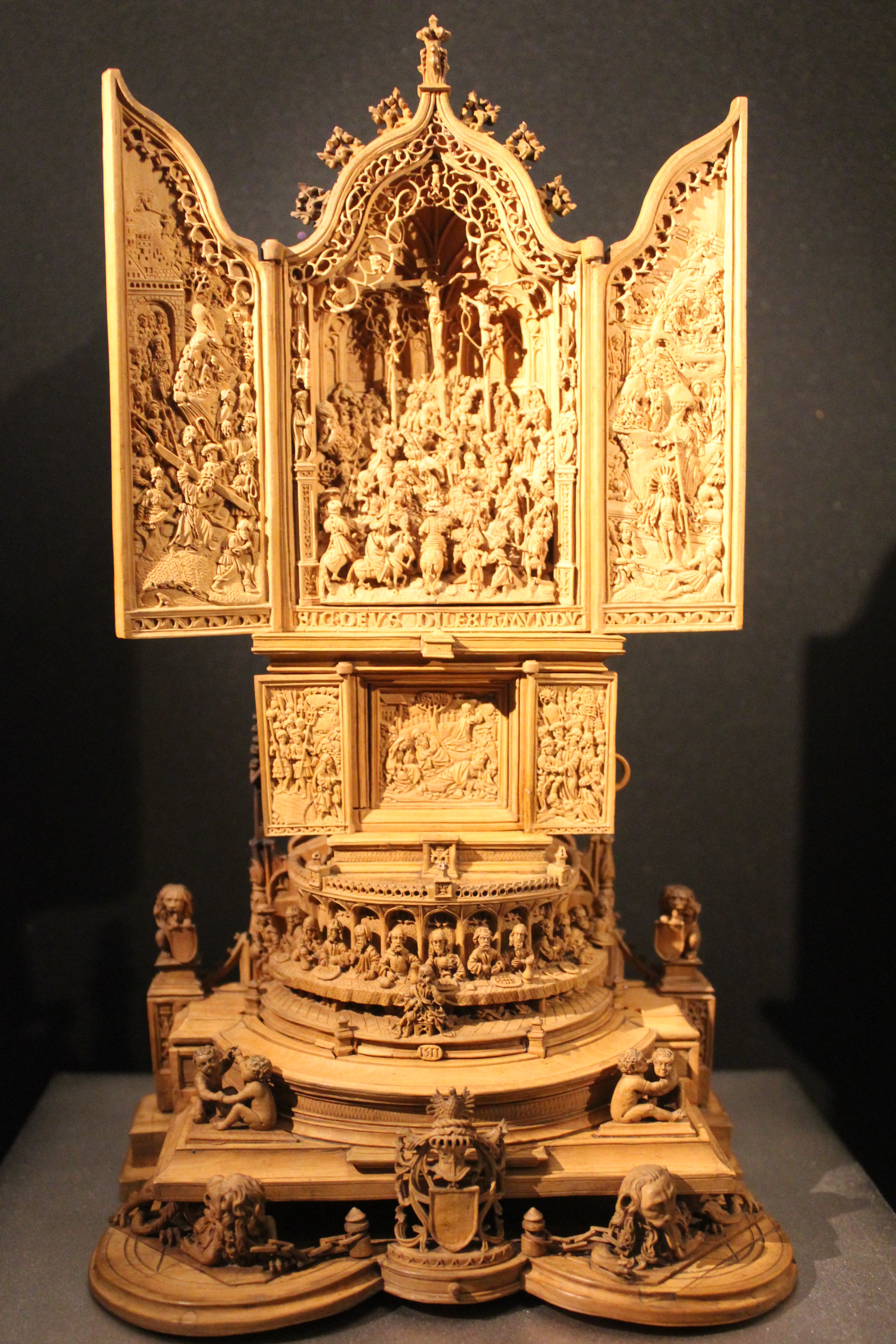
- Artist: Adam Dircksz
- Year: 1511
- Type: Gothic boxwood miniature
- Dimensions: 25.1 cm × 14 cm (9.9 in × 5.5 in)
- Location: British Museum, London

The miniature altarpiece (catalogue number WB.232) in the British Museum, London, is a very small portable Gothic boxwood miniature sculpture completed in 1511 by the Northern Netherlands master sometimes identified as Adam Dircksz (active c. 1500–1530), and members of his workshop. At 25.1 cm (9.9 in) high, it is built from a series of architectural layers or registers, which culminate at an upper triptych, whose centre panel contains a minutely detailed and intricate Crucifixion scene filled with multitudes of figures in relief. (Note: Because of their diminutive scale and the precision needed for their completion, magnifying glasses were often used in their production. See Scholten (2017), p. 57) Its outer wings show Christ Carrying the Cross on the left, and the Resurrection on the right.

The smaller triptych on the second level is carved in low relief and shows the Agony in the Garden in its central panel. Below this is a single, wide but low piece showing the betrayal by Judas Iscariot, followed by the lower again semicircular arcade depiction of the Last Supper, which is placed upon two registers that act as supports for the overall structure. The reverse of the altar contains two chambers, which may once have contained relics of saints.

The craftsman's tools used for the upper triptychs were similar to those used in the production of full-scale Early Netherlandish altarpieces and employed similar iconography. Although intended for private devotion, the miniatures became highly sought after by collectors; today only some 150 examples survive, with important collections in the British Museum, Art Gallery of Ontario, and at the Metropolitan Museum of Art, New York. The sculpture was donated to the British Museum in 1898 by Baron Ferdinand de Rothschild as part of the Waddesdon Bequest.

== Structure and iconography ==
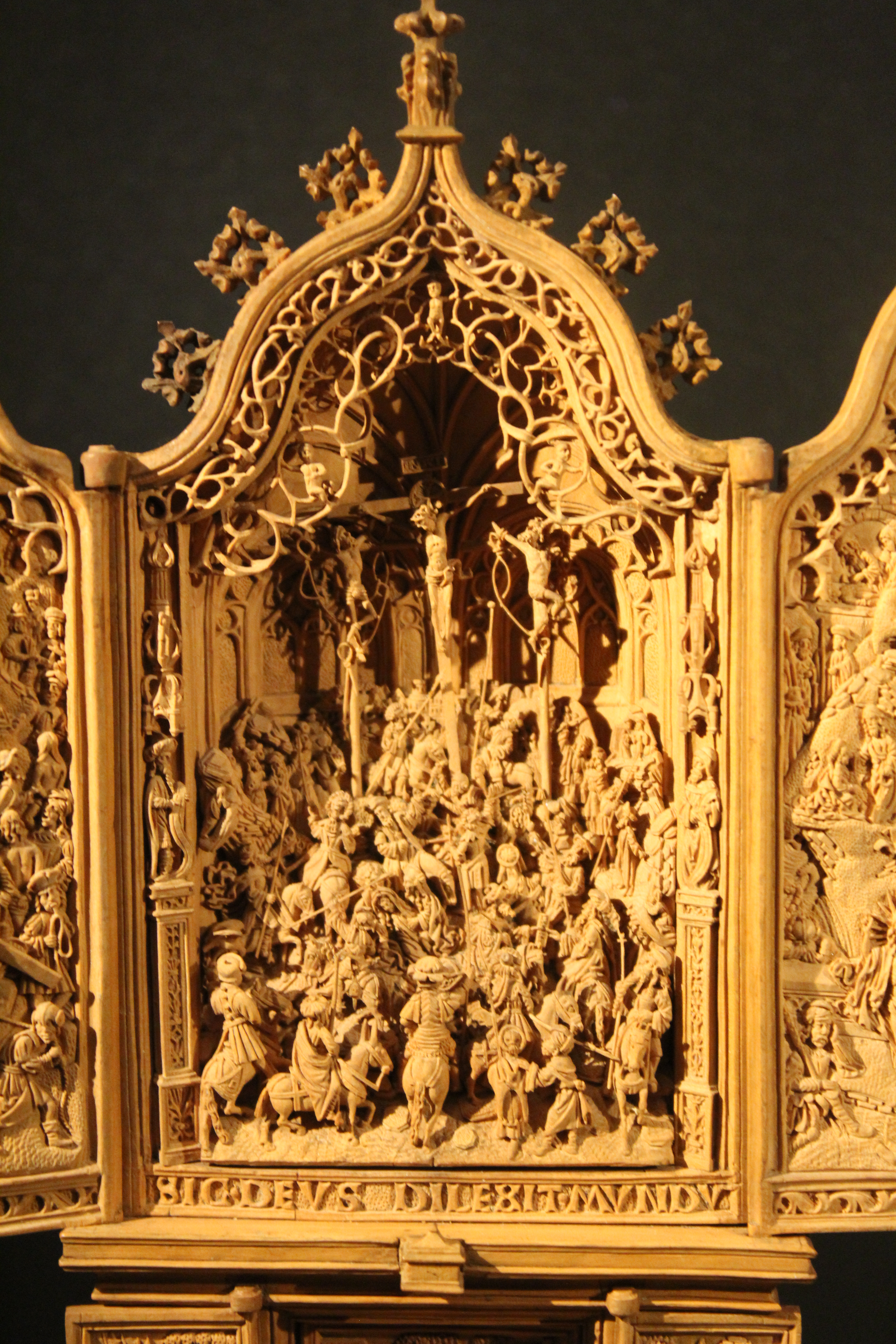
Crucifixion scene

Miniature boxwood altars became popular during the late 15th-century trend towards piety for the Passion and life of the Virgin when they were used as visual aids for private prayer. Like many miniature boxwoods of its type, it shares characteristics with full-scale altars built for churches, in this instance it resembles, and may have been modelled on, the contemporary altar, at St Bavo's Cathedral, Ghent, Belgium, where Jan van Eyck's famous Ghent Altarpiece has been held since it was created in the mid-1420s.

Although the majority of boxwood miniatures are imbued with Gothic imagery, WB.232 also contains a number of Italian Renaissance influences. In this, it is similar to the smaller miniature altarpiece OA 561, a c. 1520–1530 boxwood sculpture now in the Louvre, which was bequeathed by Ferdinand's cousin Baron Adolph Carl von Rothschild's estate in 1901, and which may or may not also be by Adam Dircksz. Both works share a very similar architectural five-level structure, with an upper Crucifixion triptych. Both works contain highly stylized figures, which resemble a third example in the Charlottenborg Palace, in Copenhagen, Denmark.

The altar comes with a leather case with gilded borders. The Louvre altar has its original Tree of Jesse case intact. The reverse contains two empty chambers, presumably intended for relics of saints, encased in a now-lost crest of arms, which would have represented the original donor or commissioning patron.

== Description ==
=== Triptychs ===
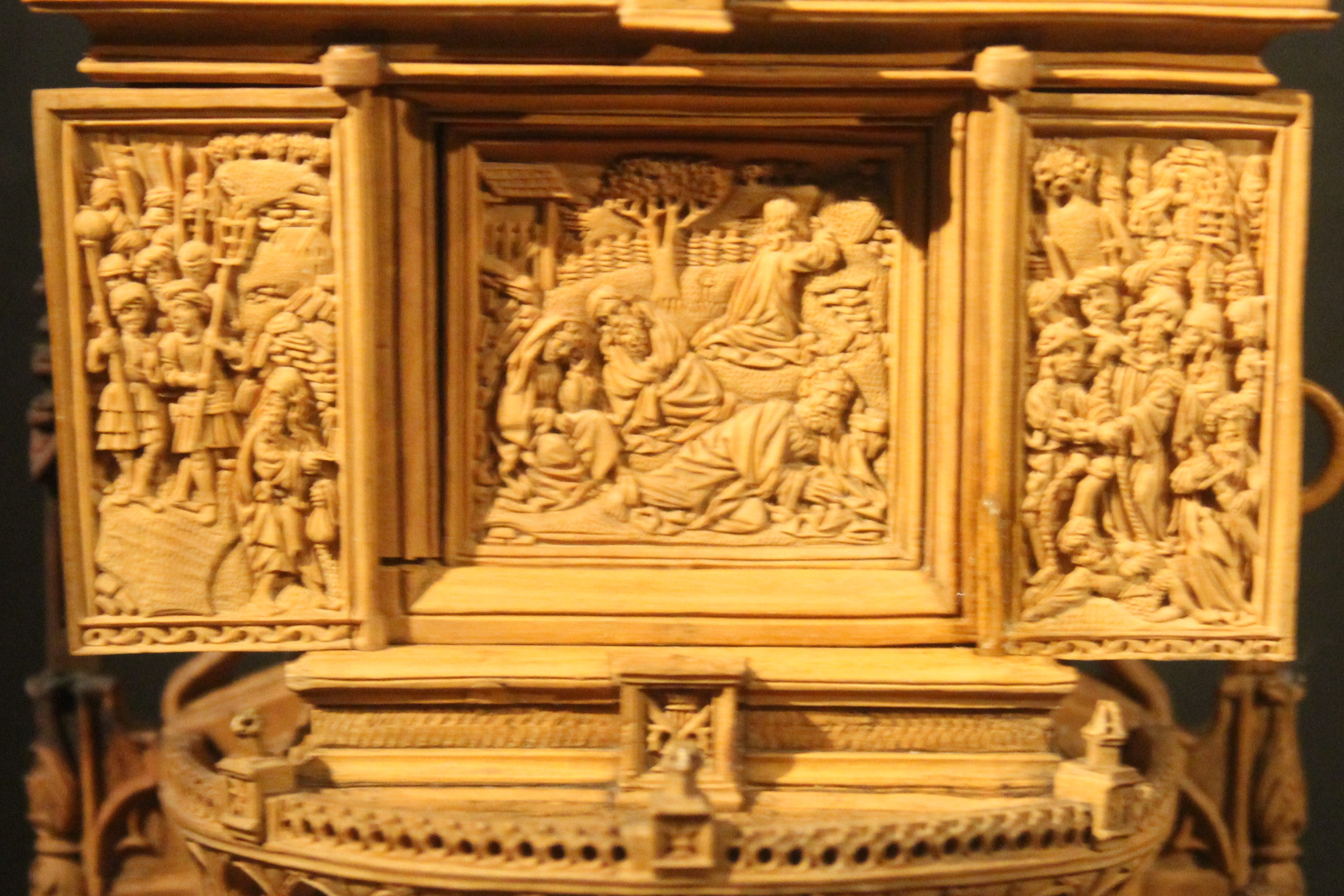
The second level triptych, showing scenes from the life of Christ, with the inscription from the crucifixion triptych above

The panels on the upper triptych are bridged by ogee (s-shaped) arches. When opened, they reveal the central panel showing the Crucifixion of Jesus in a vista populated by numerous carved figures in full relief, set against a steeply banked vaulted background. Many commentators have described the high level of detail contained in such minute panels, including by an art historian writing in 1911, who describes "hair-like ropes binding the thieves [on the crosses], and the equally hair-like spears of the soldiers, completely detached, without any support, from the background."

The base of the centre panel contains a number of horsemen, including one at the centre holding a lantern on a pole. Its upper arches are lined with tracery in full relief. The left wing shows Jesus bearing the Cross, before a distant view of the sacrifice of Isaac. The right wing depicts his resurrection, while its background vista contains a variety of biblical scenes, including his entombment.

The layer below the crucifixion is also a triptych, and contains further scenes from the life of Christ. The carved Latin inscriptions along the lower border of the central panel contain text inspired by the Gospel of Saint John, and reads "SIC DEVS. DILEXIT.MVNDV" (roughly intended as So God loved the world). The other inscription, located on the Last Supper register, is contained within a cartouche, before the central figure of Christ, reads "1511", making this Netherlandish boxwood miniature the only surviving work of its kind to be dated.

=== Arcade and base ===
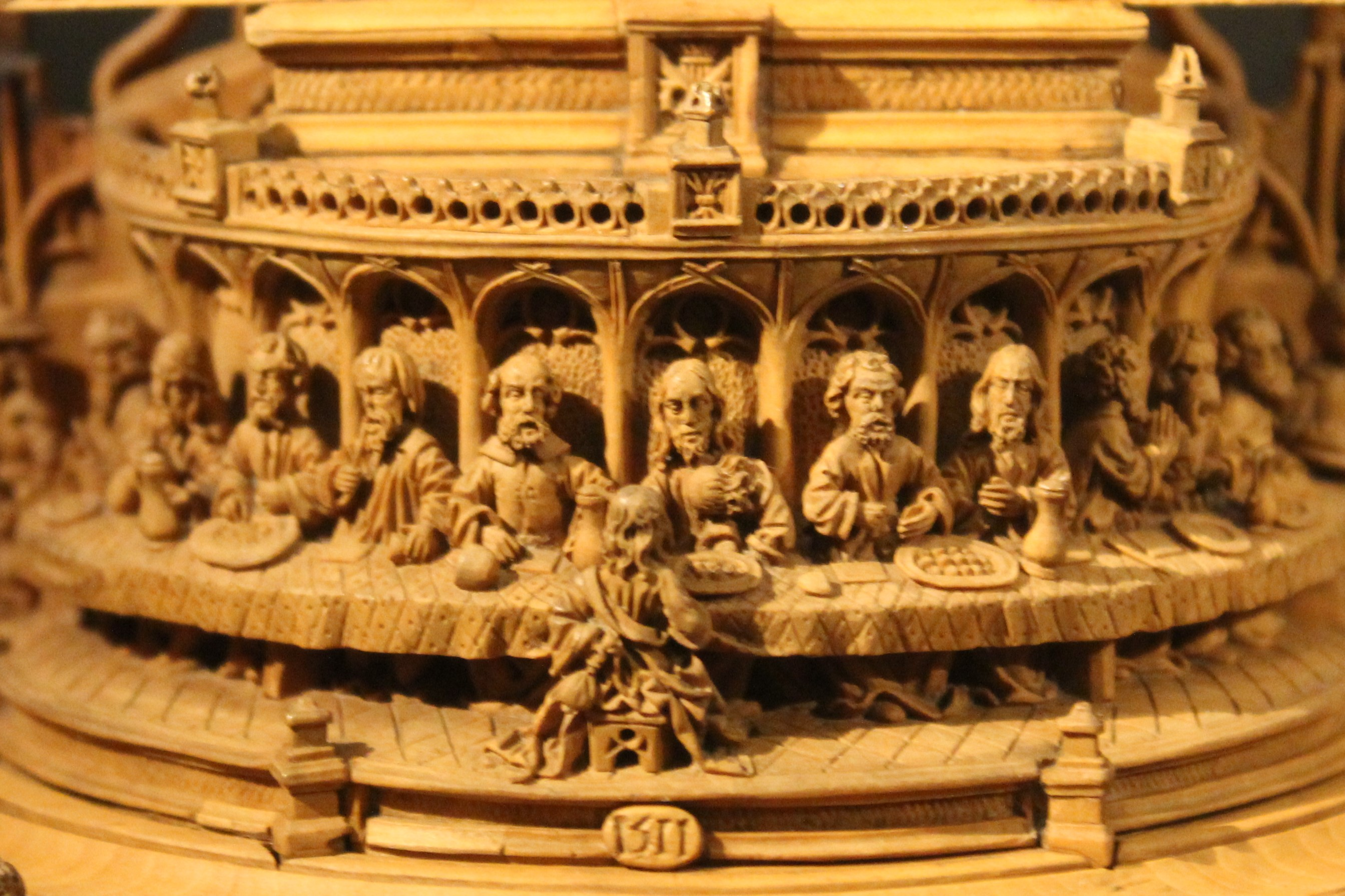
The Last Supper, detail

The semi-circular mid-section arcade is encircled by closing doors and depicts the Last Supper in full relief. Each bearded disciple is only 1.6 cm (0.63 inches) high, but given individual facial features, a food plate and wine flask. Judas Iscariot is the only attendee not at Jesus's side of the table and instead sits with his back from the viewer. On either side of the panel are recumbent lions holding blank shields and two pairs of wrestling cherubs designed in a Renaissance. According to art historian Dora Thornton, the cherubs are "a curious blend with the late Gothic manner of the overall composition". Below that again is the first of two structural bases containing recumbent, chained lions. A shield with a crest and heraldic mantling is positioned between them.

== Production and attribution ==
Because of a similarity in quality and stylistic similarities, a number of boxwood miniatures are attributed to Dircksz. The more complex miniatures must have taken decades to complete, a period equivalent to the entire career of a medieval master carver, and so the actual construction has to have involved a number of specialised artisans. Because they are so intricate and skilled, it is likely only a small number of workshops were involved in their production.

As a dense hardwood with fine grain, boxwood is resistant to splitting and chipping, and thus ideal for wood carving. Miniature boxwood triptychs, diptychs, and other polyptychs are usually formed from a single block of wood with the components hinged together. Triptychs generally followed the format and style of their larger-scale counterparts, with a central panel with major saints or a biblical scene, and two smaller ancillary wings.

Because of their miniature scale, magnifying glasses must have been used to produce these works. The tiny wood pieces were difficult to brace (hold in place) during carving. Domed spaces, intended to evoke church architecture, were drilled or carved. Relief components were either glued into prefixed niches, or they were bound with pegs, which were sometimes functional and obviously visible or implanted into the relief form. Because of this layered structure, the objects are often fragile.

== Provenance ==
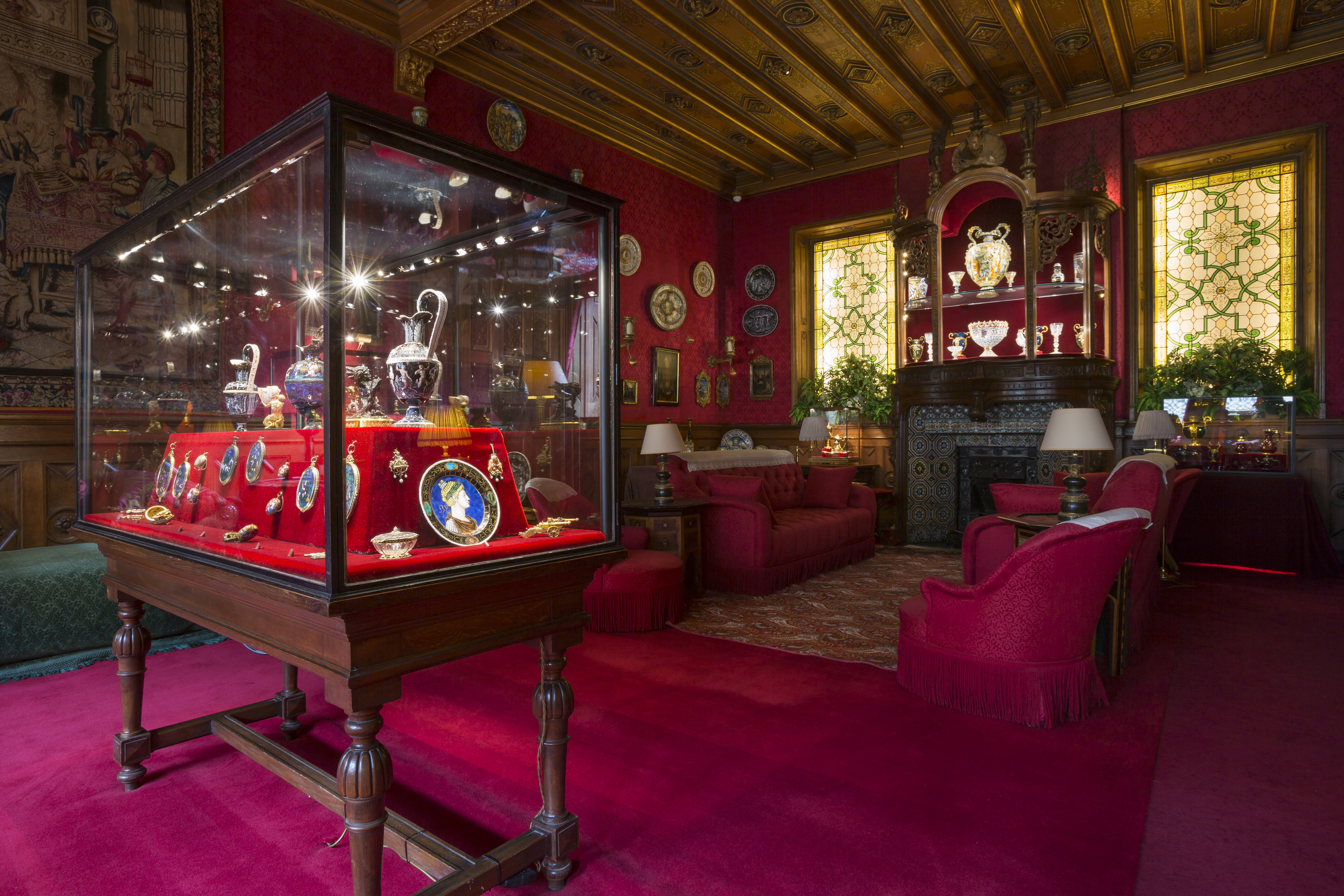
The New Smoking Room at Waddesdon Manor, original home of the collection

The altar was in the possession of the Austrian banker and member of the Vienna branch of the Rothschild family, Anselm Salomon von Rothschild of Vienna in 1866. He willed part of his collection to his son Ferdinand, including a number of other boxwoods, known then as religious objets d'art. Thornton and the art historians Pippa Shirley note that Ferdinand held the boxwoods in such esteem that they were placed centrally in the New Smoking Room of Waddesdon Manor. Ferninand's taste tended towards ornate and rarefied objects, and he was especially interested in miniature boxwood sculptures. He sought to acquire the Louvre altar, at the time belonging to his cousin Adolphe. Although his collection of prayer nuts was often laid open on pins behind small thin enamels, the more complex pieces were encased in protective glass cases. Ferdinand's interest in boxwood carvings is further evident in his long but unsuccessful pursuit of the Paris miniature altar owned by his cousin; both father and son were keenly fascinated by objects of this kind.

It was bequeathed, as part of the Waddesdon Bequest, to the British Museum on Ferdinand's death in 1898, marking one of the most significant acquisitions in the museum's history.
