= Cui Zizhong =

Cuī Zǐzhōng (Chinese: 崔子忠; Wade–Giles: Ts'ui Tzu-chung; died 1644) was a Chinese painter during the Ming dynasty (1368–1644).

Cui was born in Laiyang in the Shandong province. His style name was 'Daomu' and his sobriquet was 'Qingying'. Cui specialized in human figure painting following in the style of Zhou Wenju in its tense and heightened state. He went on strike for a period of time when Li Zicheng captured Beijing, where he was living at the time. Cui's reputation for great painting led to him to be known colloquially as 'Cui in North'.
