= Adoration of the Trinity =

1511 painting by Albrecht Dürer

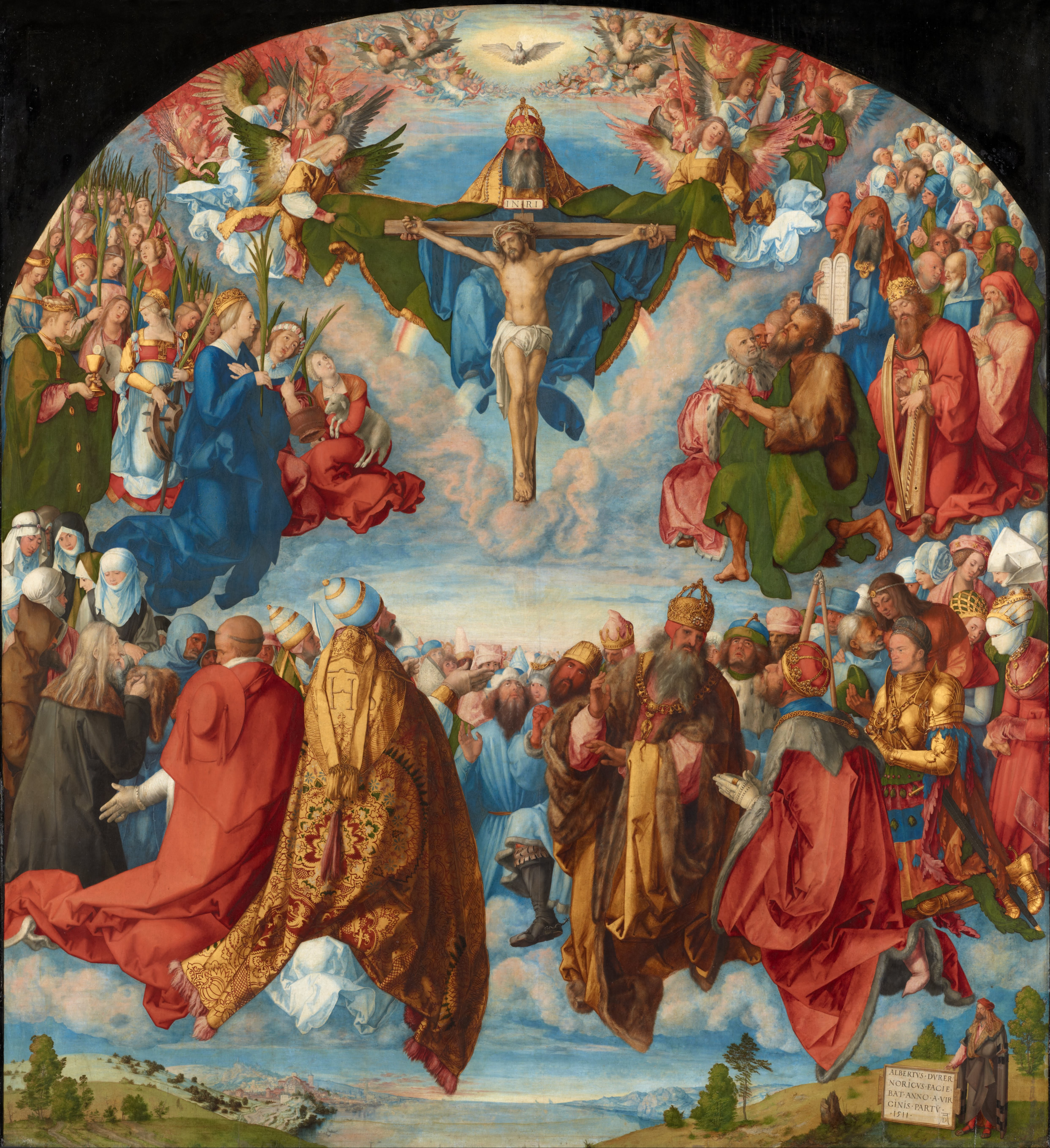
- Artist: Albrecht Dürer
- Year: 1509–1511
- Type: Oil on poplar panel
- Dimensions: 135 cm × 123 cm (53 in × 48 in)
- Location: Kunsthistorisches Museum; Vienna

Adoration of the Trinity (also known as the Landauer Altarpiece; German: Allerheiligenbild or Landauer Altar) is an oil painting on panel by the German Renaissance artist Albrecht Dürer, executed in 1511 and now in the Kunsthistorisches Museum, Vienna, Austria.

== History ==
The work was commissioned by the rich merchant Matthäus Landauer of Nuremberg for a chapel dedicated to the Holy Trinity and All the Saints in the Zwölfbrüderhaus ('House of Twelve Brothers'), which he had founded with Erasmus Schiltkrot in 1501. The house was a charity institution which could house up to twelve artisans who were unable to sustain themselves with their work; Landauer himself lived here from 1510 until his death.

The altarpiece was commissioned in 1508, but was delivered three years later, when it was placed in the church.

== Description ==
The altar had no movable panels, as in numerous previous similar installations, and was included in a rich frame, also designed by Dürer. There is a carved depiction of the Last Judgement at the top of the frame, and it also displays the donors' coats of arms.

The crowded altarpiece depicts the Trinity, with God the Father holding or offering to the viewer Christ crucified. Above them, in a cloud of light surrounded by cherubim, is the Holy Spirit in the form of a dove. God the Father wears an imperial crown and a wide gilt cloak, lined in green and supported by angels. The scene utilizes hierarchical scale to depict God and the angels centrally above the earth below.

The artist paints a host of male and female saints of Heaven, inspired by Augustine, who are led by John the Baptist and the Virgin Mary, respectively. Below, the human multitudes are divided between religious men and women (left, led by the pope), and laymen, led by the Holy Roman Emperor—a division similar to that already adopted by Dürer in the Feast of the Rosary (1506). At left, near a cardinal who is perhaps interceding for him, is the aged Matthäus Landauer, wearing rich garments and putting down his hat. A peasant, with one of his tools, represents the poor classes. On the right is an enigmatic queen whose face is entirely hidden by a veil, which leaves only the eyes visible.

The lower section is occupied by a large landscape with the dawn above a lake, among hills, inspired by landscapes by Albrecht Altdorfer and Joachim Patinir. There is also a self-portrait of Dürer holding a cartouche with the signature and date inscription:

ALBERTUS DURER NORICUS FACIEBAT ANNO A VIRIGINIS PARTU 1511

== Gallery ==
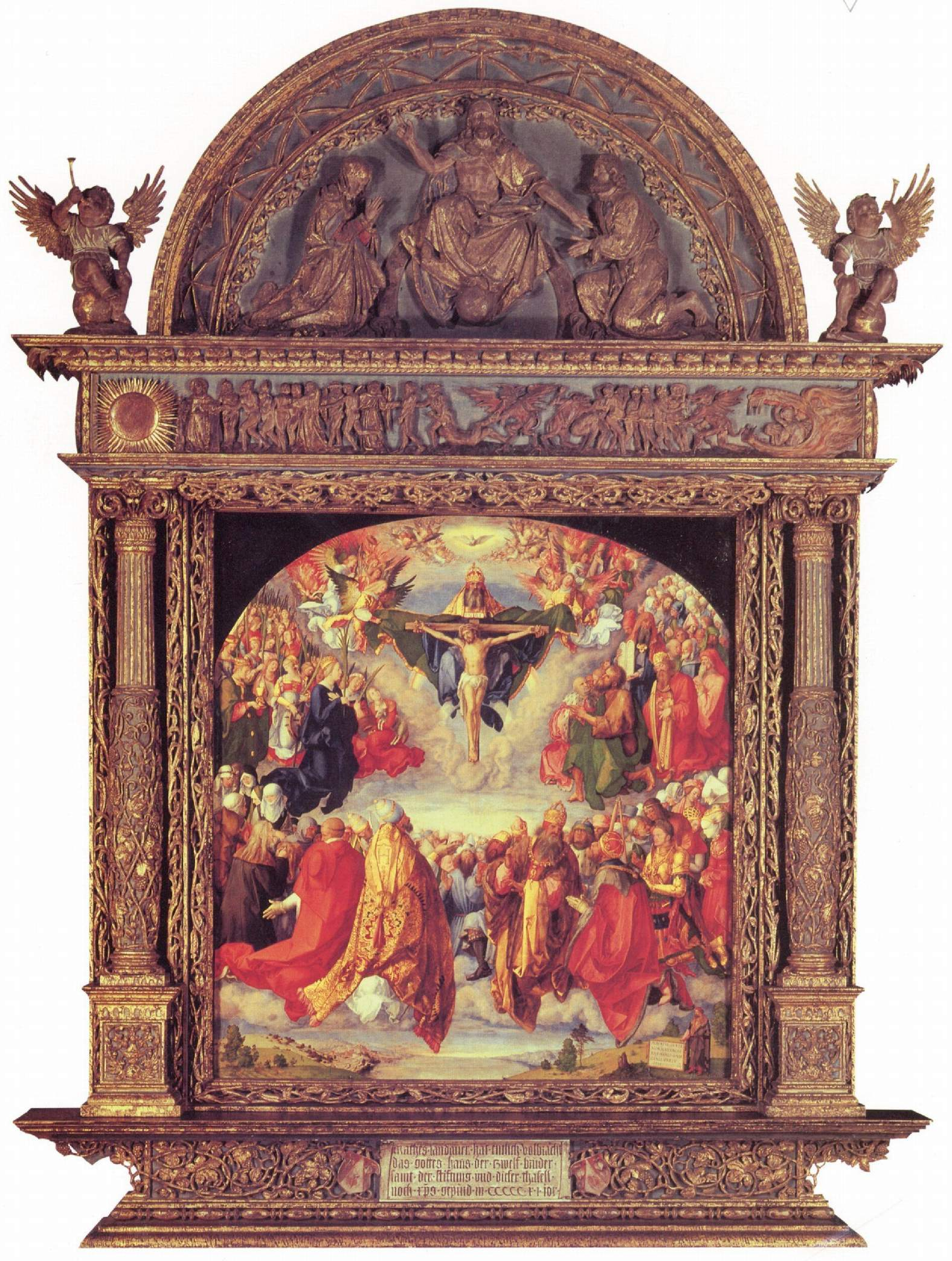
The altarpiece with Dürer's frame

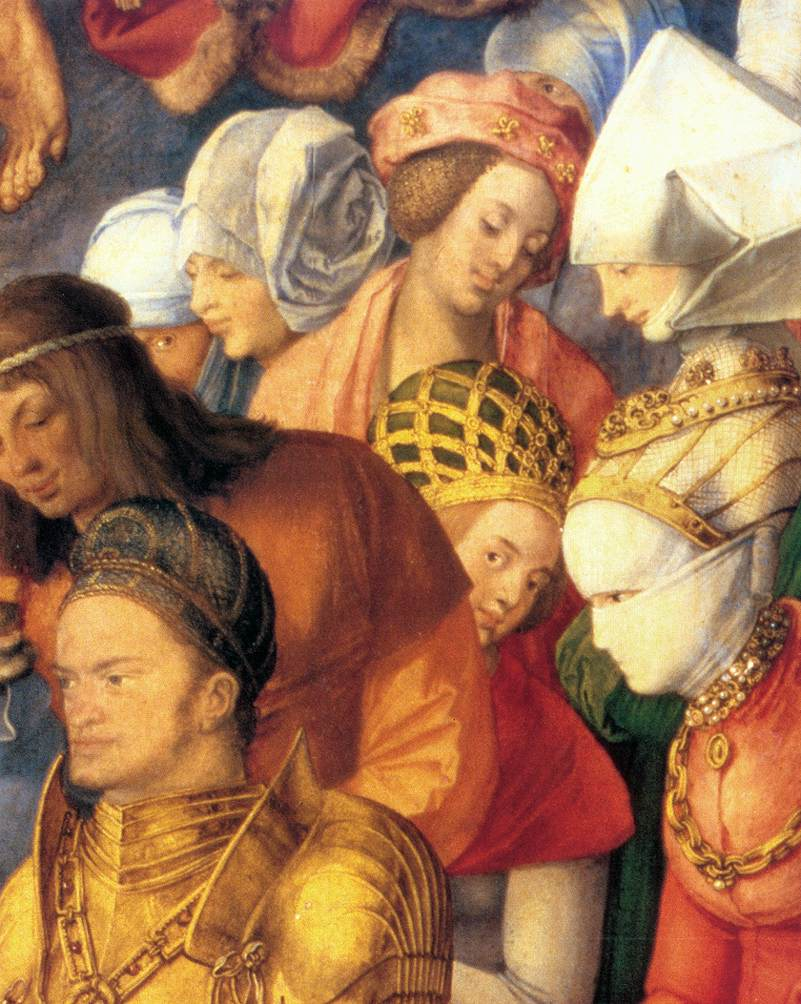
Detail with the veiled queen

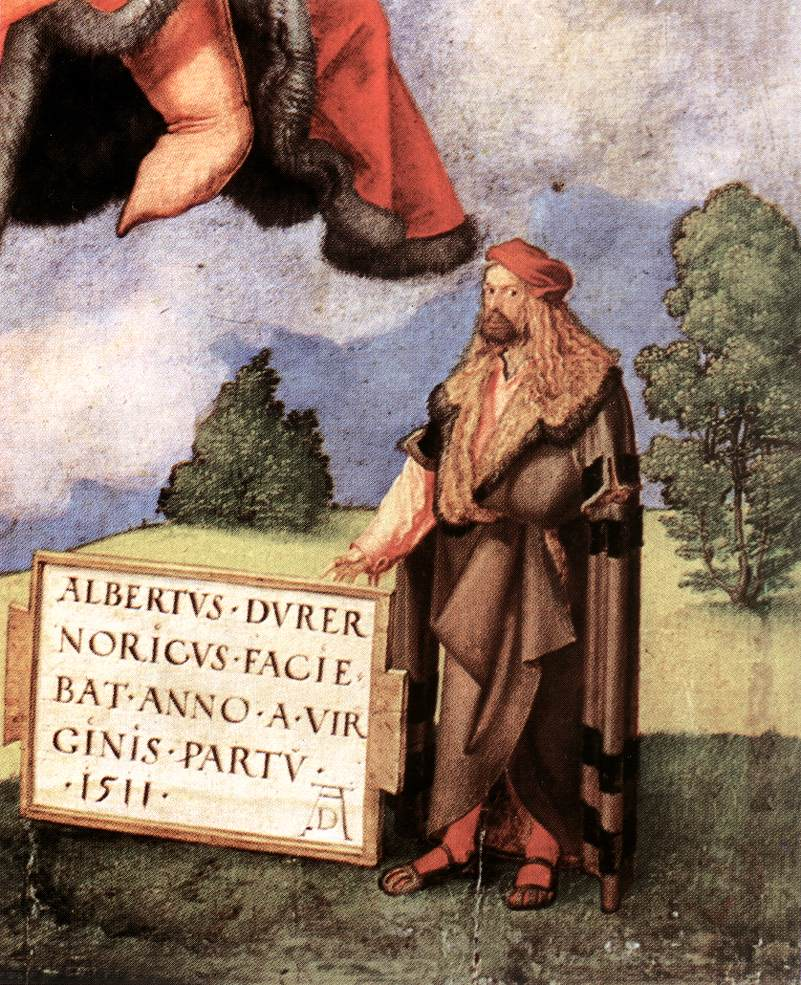
Detail with self-portrait and inscription

== See also ==
- List of paintings by Albrecht Dürer

== Sources ==
- Carty, C. M. (1985). Albrecht Dürer's Adoration of the Trinity: a reinterpretation. Art Bulletin, 67: 146–153.
- Porcu, Costantino, ed. (2004). Dürer. Milan: Rizzoli.
