= Claudio de Arciniega =

16th-century Spanish architect and sculptor

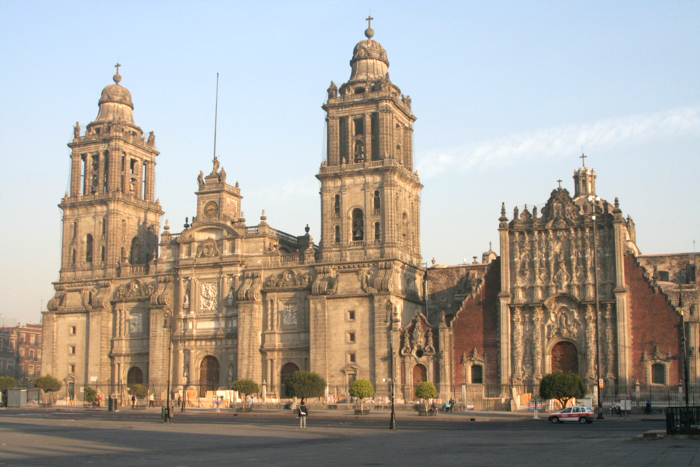
Mexico City Metropolitan Cathedral

Claudio de Arciniega (Spanish pronunciation: [ˈklawðjo ðe aɾθiˈnjeɣa]; c. 1520–1593) was a Spanish architect and sculptor. He designed the Mexico City Metropolitan Cathedral and possibly the Puebla Cathedral.

Arciniega was born in Burgos, Spain around 1520 and moved to the New World in the mid-16th century. While in Spain, he worked as a sculptor in Madrid and Alcalá de Henares. After moving to what is now Mexico, he worked on different architectural projects, including building a viceroy's palace from the remains of Montezuma's home and designing the first building for Mexico City's university. He worked on the Mexico City Cathedral until his death.
