= Francisco Antolínez =

Spanish painter

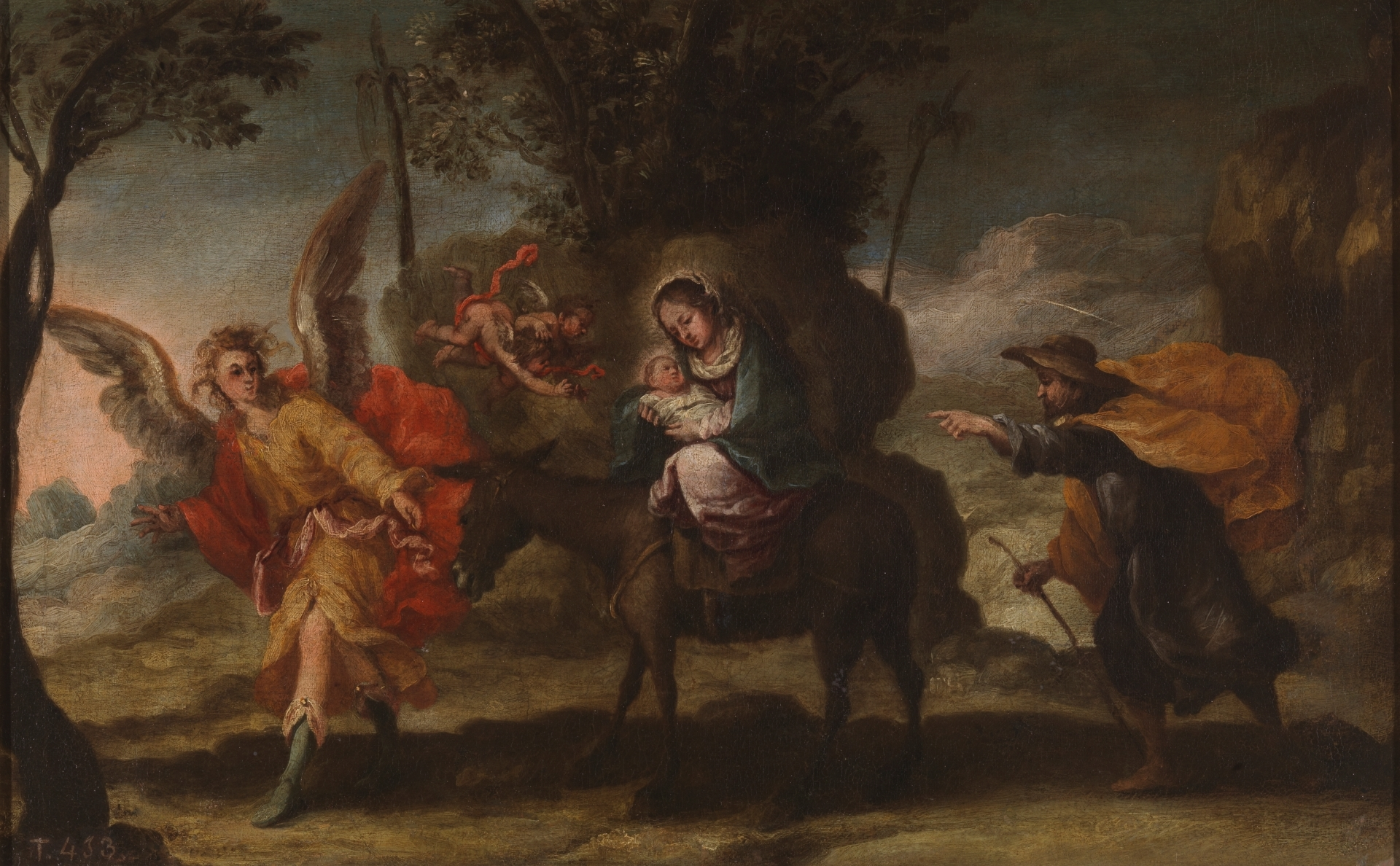
Flight into Egypt, oil on panel, 45 by 73 cm, undated, now in the Museo del Prado in Madrid

Francisco Antolínez de Sarabia (1645–1700) was a historical and landscape painter who studied in the school of Murillo, whose style and manner of colouring he followed.

He was born at Seville, and was a nephew of José Antolínez. He went to his uncle at Madrid in 1672; but notwithstanding his having already distinguished himself as a painter, he left the profession for literary pursuits, and for the purpose of obtaining a lucrative situation at the bar, having been originally educated at Seville for the law. Being unsuccessful, he was compelled again to have recourse to painting, as a means of subsistence. It was then that he produced those small pictures from the Bible and the life of the Virgin, which are so much admired by amateurs for their invention, colour, and facility of execution. He died in 1700, regretted by the true friends of art, who lamented the misapplication of those talents with which he was endowed.

== Works ==
His paintings included:

- Flight into Egypt (undated), oil on panel, 45 by 73 cm, now in the Prado, Madrid
- Jacob and Rachel at the Well (1670), now at the El Paso Museum of Art
- The Adoration of the Pastors (1678), Seville Cathedral
- Desposorios de la Virgen
- The Annunciation, Prado, Madrid
- The Adoration of the Kings (La Adoración de los Reyes), Prado, Madrid
- Moises Maimonide, Madrid - 1661, Private owner

Other paintings by Antolínez are now at the Budapest Castle and the Art Institute of Chicago being a few listed.
