= Étienne Allegrain =

French topographical painter

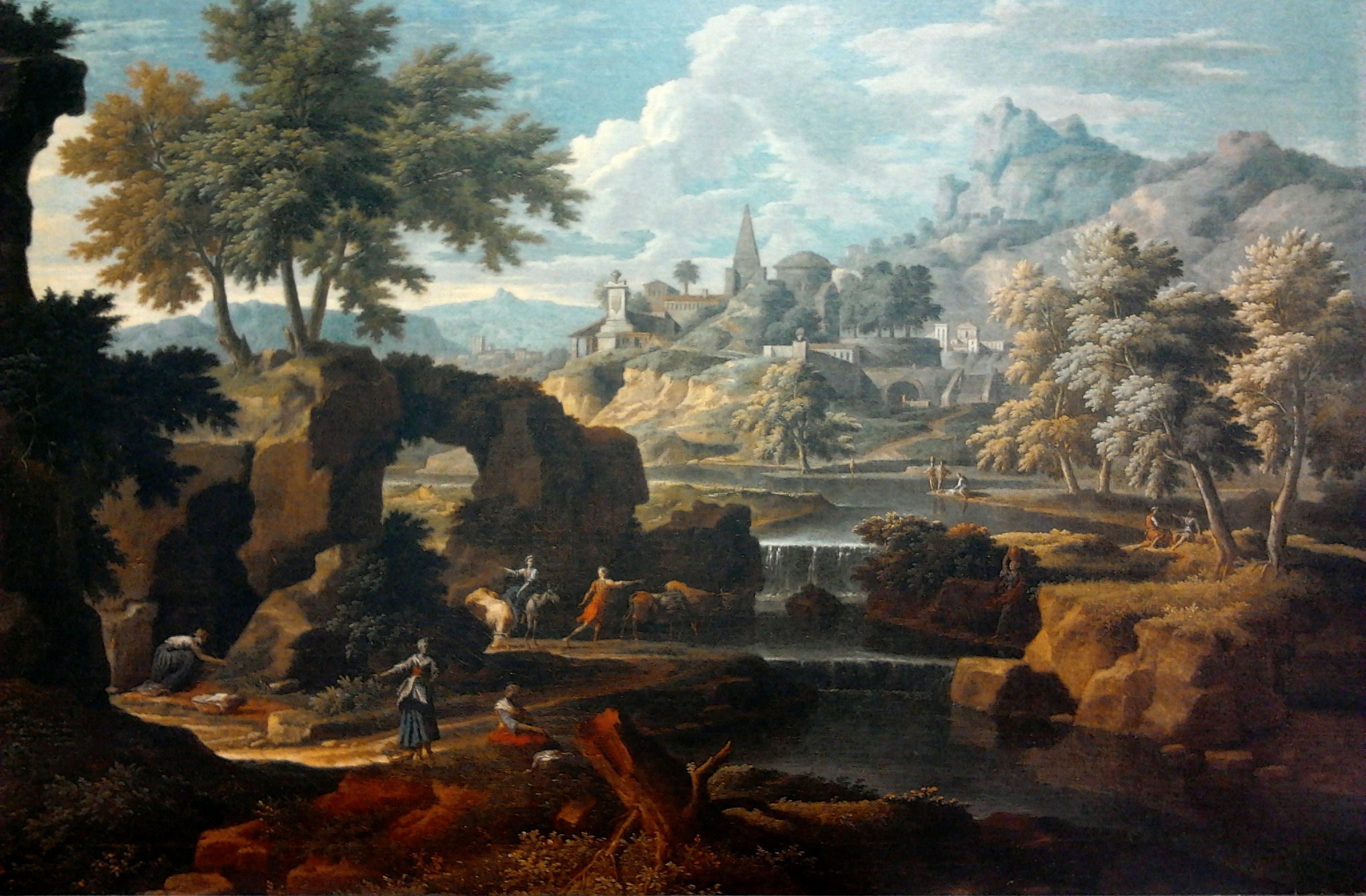
Classical landscape with staffage, painted in Poussin's style (Wilanów Palace in Warsaw).

Étienne Allegrain (1644 – 2 April 1736) was a French topographical painter. Inspired by Nicolas Poussin, he evoked still ambiences and atmospherics bathed in a deep play of light and shade.

His grand-son Christophe-Gabriel Allegrain became a famous sculptor.
