= Hans Gillisz. Bollongier =

Dutch painter (1600–1645)

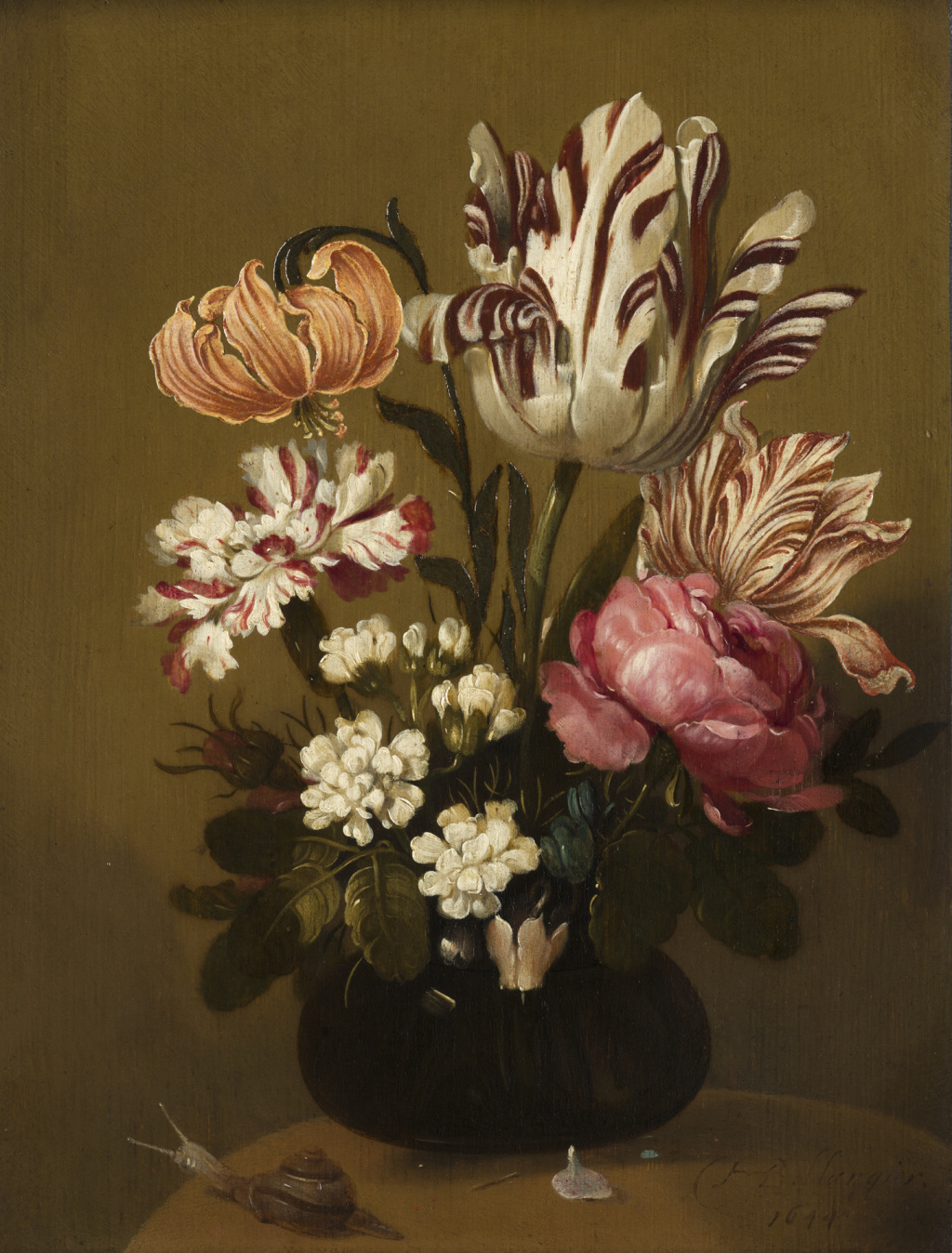
Hans Gillisz. Bollongier, Flower Piece, Frans Hals Museum, 1644. The top flower was always the most expensive one and in this bouquet it is the tulip Semper augustus.

Hans Gillisz. Bollongier or Boulenger (1600 – 1645) was a Dutch Golden Age still life flower painter.

== Biography ==
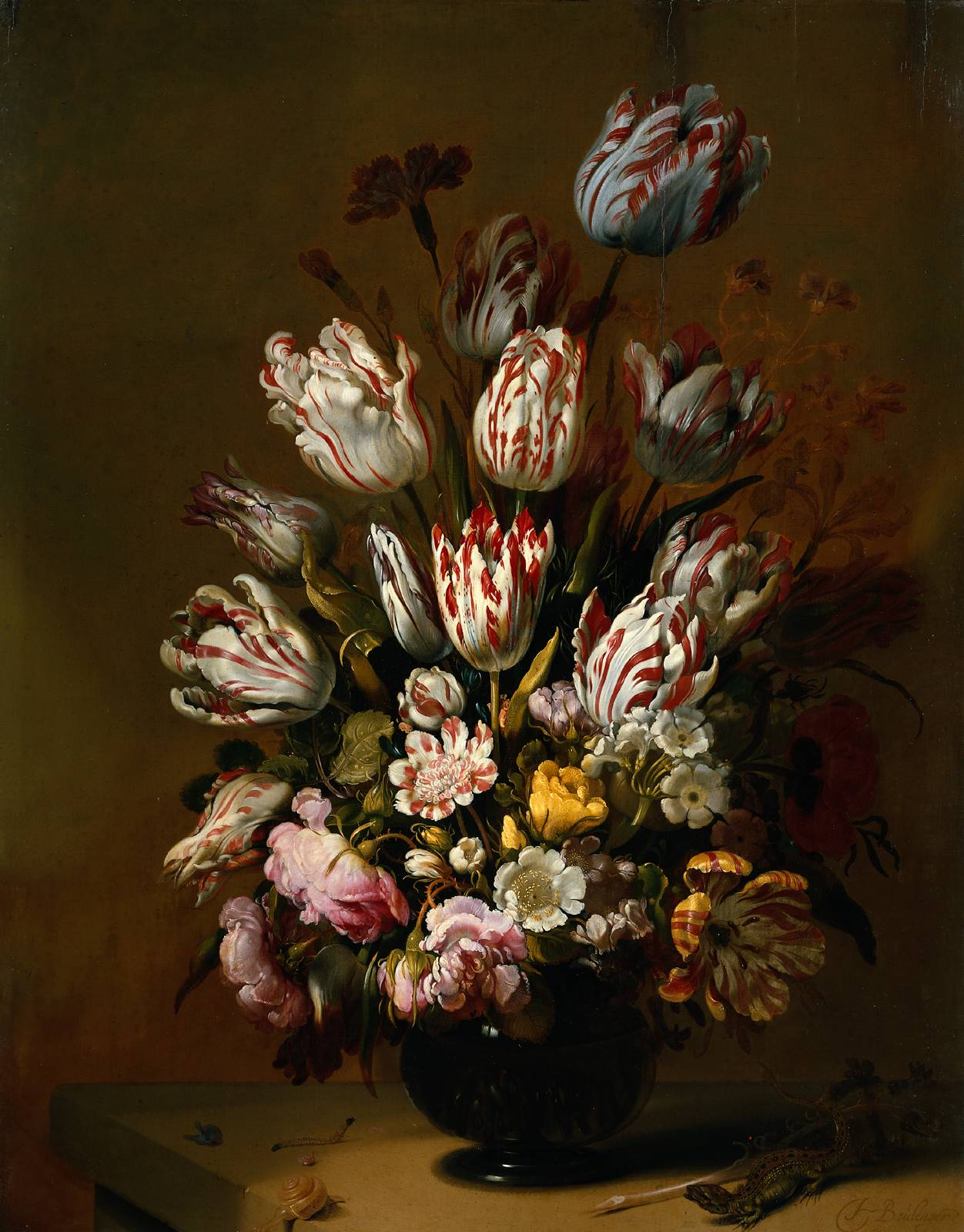
Hans Gillisz. Bollongier, Flower Piece, Rijksmuseum, 1639.

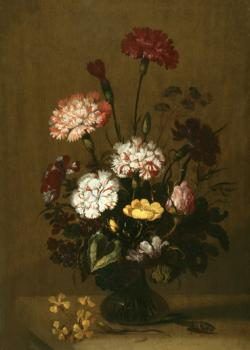
Hans Gillisz. Bollongier, Flowers in a glass vase, München, 1640.

Bollongier was born and died in Haarlem. According to the RKD little is known of his early life. He became a member of the Haarlem Guild of St. Luke in 1623, and in 1675 his younger brother Horatio was named as his beneficiary. He was a specialist in bouquets of blooms. Paintings attributed to him that are not flower- or fruit still lifes are likely the work of his brother Horatio. He was an important influence on the later flower painters known as the monogrammist JF and Anthony Claesz II. He painted during a period of great productivity for Haarlem painters, during the decades after Karel van Mander published his Schilderboeck there. In Karel van Mander's book, there were a set of rules to follow to create good paintings and good drawings. Bollongier developed his own style and still observed all of these rules. His paintings were very popular, but his work was not regarded as such by contemporary Haarlem painters. As a genre, still life painting was considered inferior to historical allegories.

His work today is considered part of the proof that Tulip Mania took place, although there is reason to believe that this is also just part of early Haarlem tourist propaganda. Even as early as the 17th century, gentry from Amsterdam, Leiden, and places farther away enjoyed visiting the tulip fields of Haarlem in the Spring, and paintings of tulips were as popular as the bulbs.
