= Pierre Lamo =

Italian painter

Pierre Lamo (died 1578) was an Italian painter mainly of histories. He was a pupil of Innocenzo da Imola. He died in Bologna.
