= Jean Petitot =

French painter (1607–1691)

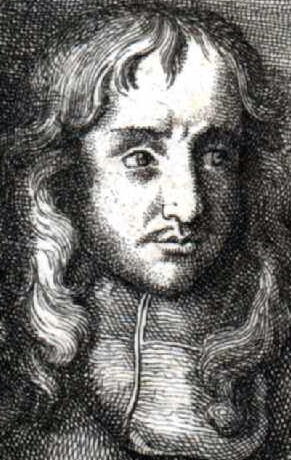
- Born: July 12, 1607; Geneva, Republic of Geneva
- Died: April 3, 1691 (aged 83); Vevey, Switzerland
- Known for: Enamel portrait miniatures

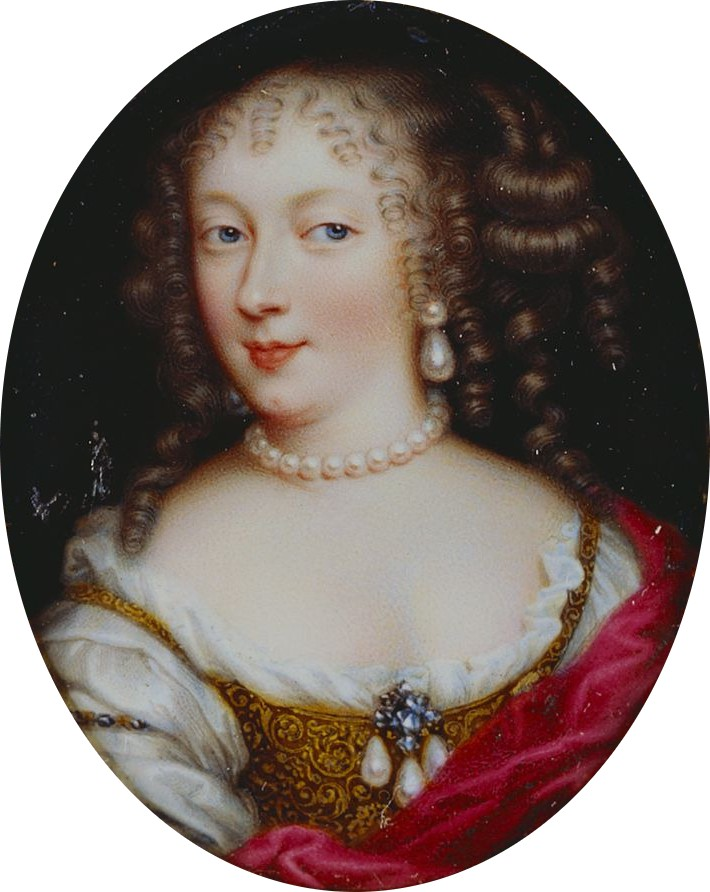
Henrietta of England (1660)

Jean Petitot (French: [ʒɑ̃ pəti.to]; July 12, 1607 – April 3, 1691) was an enamel painter from the Republic of Geneva, who spent most of his career working for the courts of France and England.

== Life ==
He was born at Geneva, a member of a Burgundian family which had fled from France on account of religious difficulties. His father, Faule, was a wood carver and architect, who obtained citizenship of the Republic of Geneva in 1615. Jean was the fourth son, and was apprenticed to a jeweller goldsmith named Pierre Bordier, with whom he struck up a close friendship. The two friends, dissatisfied with the progress they made in Geneva, went into France, and after working for a while with Toutin went to England with letters of introduction to Turquet de Mayerne, physician to Charles I, who presented them to the king, for whom they made a St George for the badge of the order and carried out many commissions for portraits; amongst others preparing two large ones representing Rachel de Ruvigny, countess of Southampton, now at Chatsworth, and Mary Villiers, duchess of Richmond and Lennox, dated 1643, at one time in the possession of the Crown and now in the Pierpont Morgan collection.

On the execution of the king, Petitot left England for Paris with the royal household, Bordier remaining in England and carrying out certain important commissions for Cromwell and the parliament. On reaching Paris, Petitot entered into partnership with a goldsmith, Jacques Bordier, a cousin of Pierre, and it seems probable from recent research in contemporary documents that the enamel portraits attributed to Petitot were really the work of the two partners collaborating, the actual drawing being the work of Petitot, while for the enamel process Bordier was mainly responsible. The two painters were given apartments in the Louvre, received numerous commissions from Louis XIV, and painted portraits of almost every person of importance in his brilliant court. The friendship between the two lasted for thirty-five years, and was only put an end to by Bordier's death. The enamellers rendered special political services in France for the republic of Geneva, and were practically regarded as the official representatives of the republic, receiving warm thanks from the Syndics for their diplomatic work.

On the revocation of the Edict of Nantes, 1685, pressure was brought to bear upon Petitot that he should change his religion. The king protected him as long as possible, and when he was arrested, with his niece, Anne Bordier, sent Bossuet, who was bishop of Meaux, to convince the old man of the error of his ways. Eventually, in poor health and great despair, Petitot placed his signature to an act of abjuration, and Louis XIV, unwilling to acknowledge the true reason for the imprisonment of Petitot and for his liberation, informed one of his sons, who came to thank him for the pardon given to his father, that he was willing to fall in for once with the whim of an old man who desired to be buried with his ancestors. In 1687 therefore Petitot left Paris to return to Geneva, and, after a long and tedious inquiry, was absolved by the consistory of the church of Geneva from the crime of which they considered he had been guilty, and received back to the Huguenot communion in the church of St Gervais. In Geneva he received a very important commission from John Sobieski, king of Poland, who required portraits of himself and his queen. This was followed by numberless other commissions which the painter carried out. He died of paralysis on April 3, 1691 at Vevey, while in the very act of painting on the enamel a portrait of his faithful wife.

== Works ==
Of the works of Petitot the major collection is in the Jones Bequest at the Victoria and Albert Museum. There are many in the Louvre, sixteen at Chantilly, and seventeen at Windsor. Petitot was collected by Earl Beauchamp, the Duke of Rutland, the Duke of Richmond, the Earl of Dartrey, Alfred de Rothschild, the Portland Collection and Baroness Burdett-Coutts. Amongst Lord Dartrey's examples were portraits of Petitot and of his son, and two of the wife of Jean Petitot the younger. A second portrait of the artist belonged to the Queen of Holland, and another was in the collection of Stroehlin of Geneva. In J. P. Morgan's collection there were many fine examples, including three drawings on paper, the only three which appear to have survived, and the large signed miniature of the duchess of Richmond already mentioned, the largest work Petitot ever did other than one Chatsworth House.

== Gallery ==
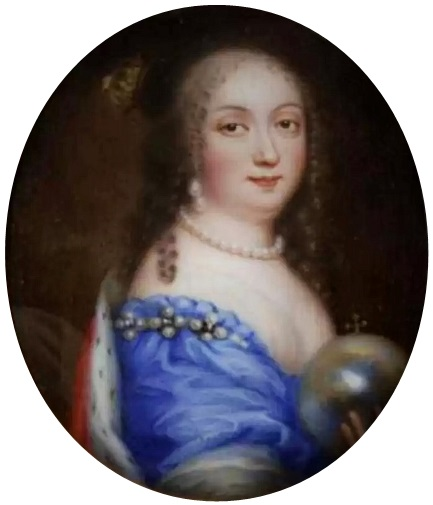
Marie Louise Gonzaga, before 1650

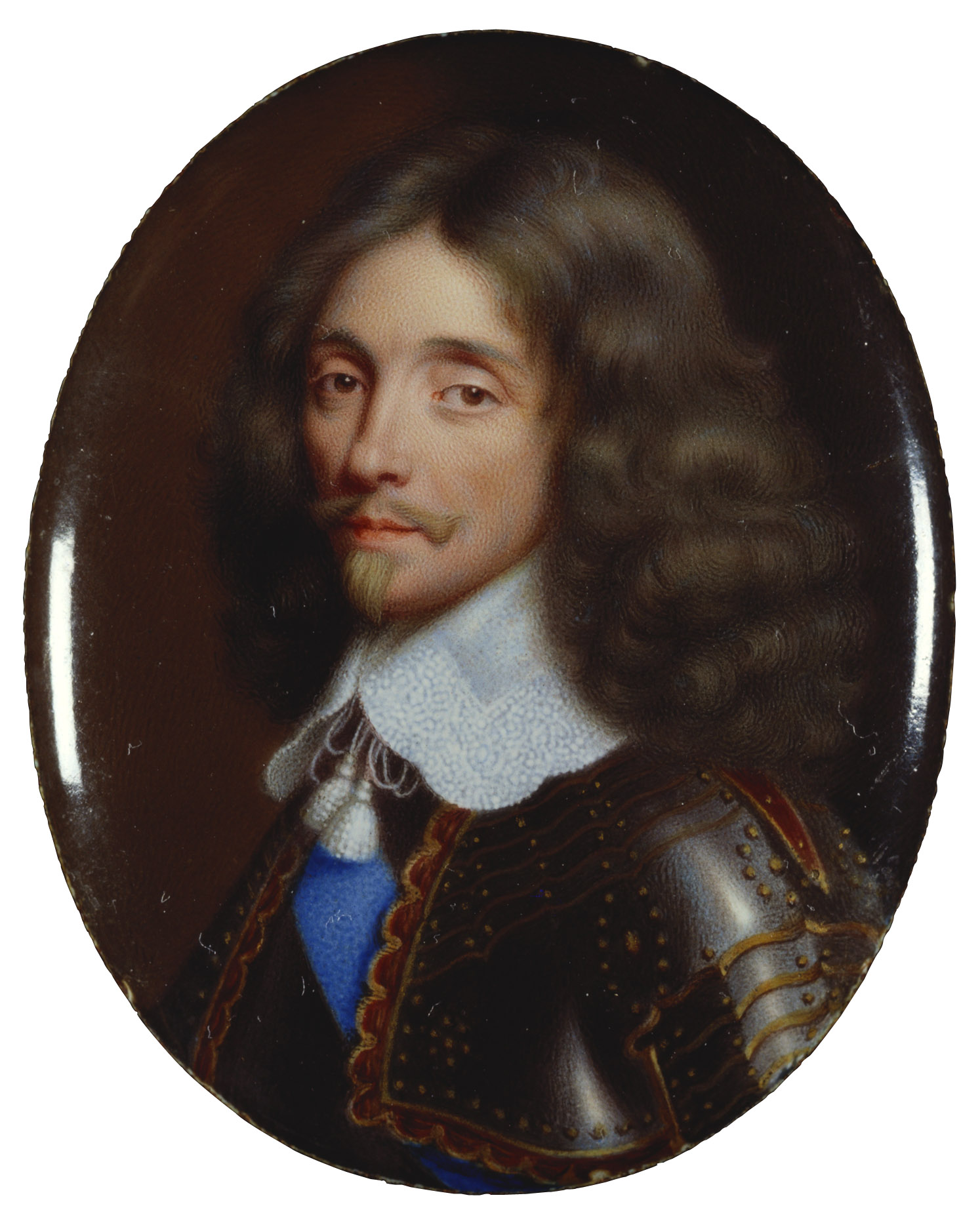
Charles de la Porte, Duc de Milleraye (1602-1664), between 1648 and 1664

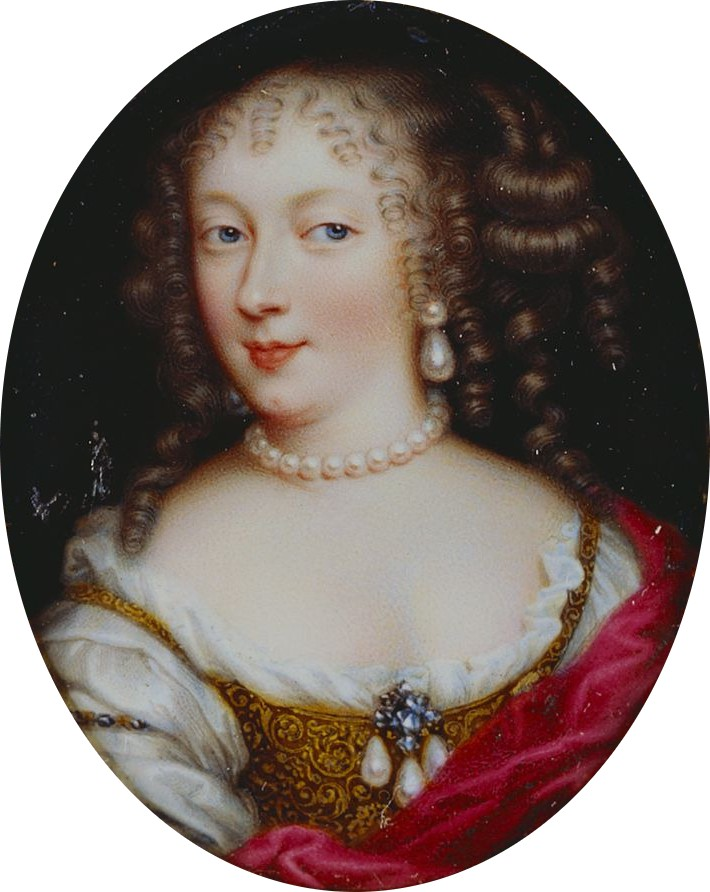
Henrietta, Duchess of Orléans (1644-1670), c. 1660

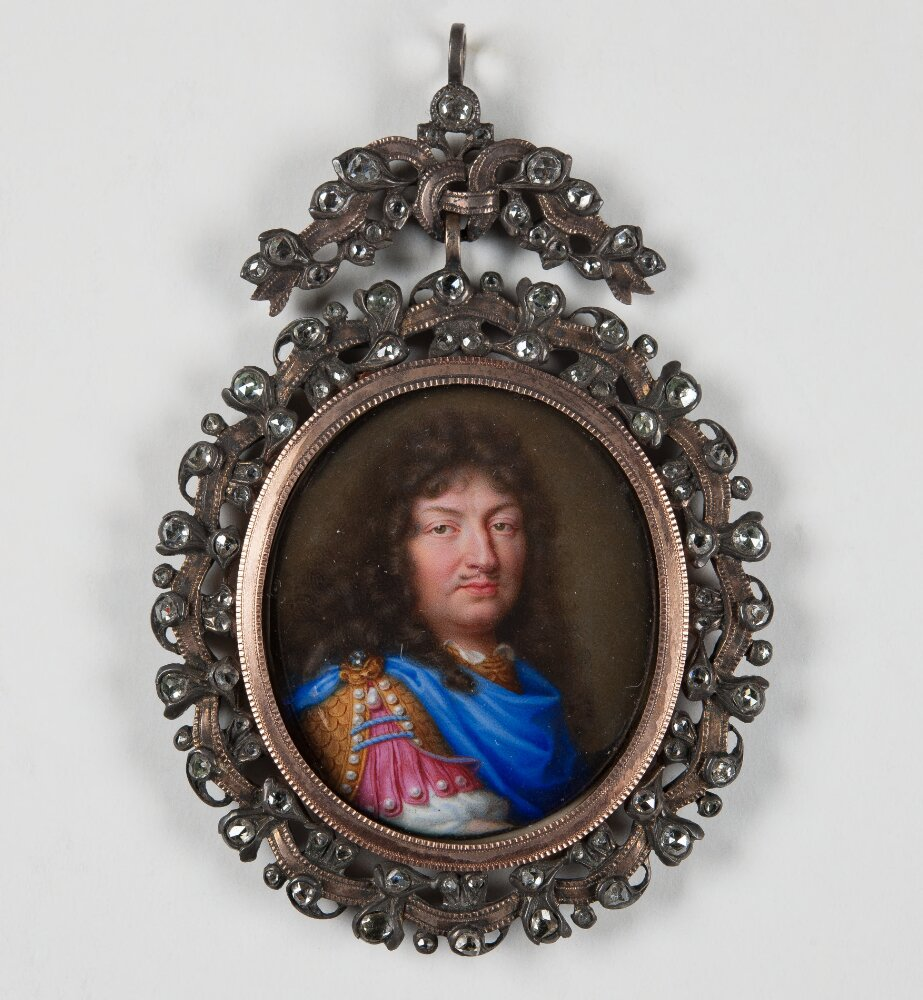
Louis XIV, King of France, between 1673 and 1677

== Family ==
Petitot married Marguerite Cuper in 1651. He had seventeen children, among them Jean Louis Petitot, and for their benefit wrote out a little octavo volume containing some genealogical information, portraits of himself and his wife, with prayers, meditations and religious advice. He also prepared a second manuscript volume of prayers and meditations for the use of his family.
