= Jean Louis Petitot =

French painter (1653–1702)

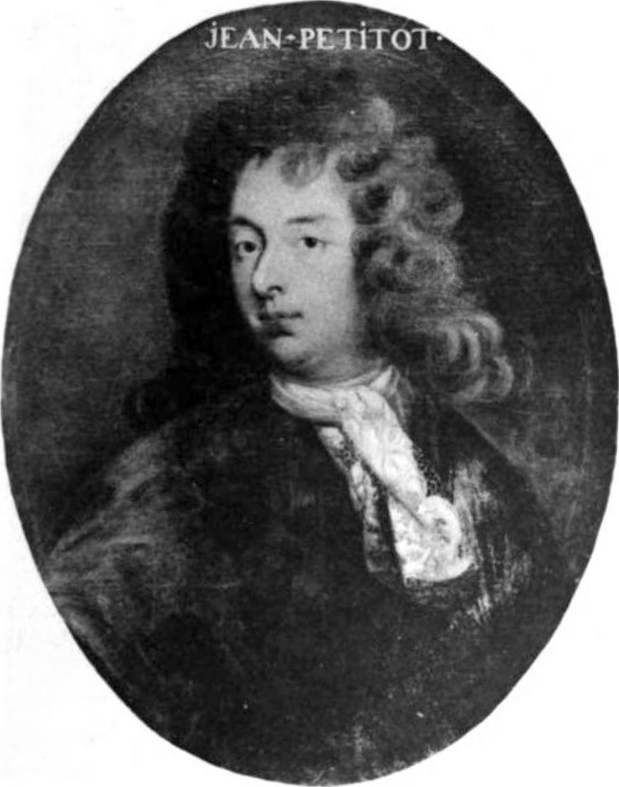
Jean Louis Petitot.

Jean Petitot, sometimes called Jean-Louis Petitot (French: [ʒɑ̃ lwi pətito]; 2 January 1653 – 29 October 1702) was a Genevan and French enamel painter. He was the eldest son of Jean Petitot, and was instructed in enameling by his father. Some of his works so closely resemble those of the elder Petitot that it is difficult to distinguish between them, and he was really the only serious rival his father ever had. He settled for a while in London, where he stayed until 1682, and painted many enamel portraits of Charles II. In 1682 he moved to Paris, but in 1695 was back again in London, where he remained until his death.

His portrait by Mignard is in the museum at Geneva, and another in enamel by himself in the collection of the earl of Dartrey, who also owns two of his wife, Madeleine Bordier, whom he married in 1683. Another portrait believed to represent him was in the collection of John Pierpont Morgan.
