= Zhang Han (Ming dynasty) =

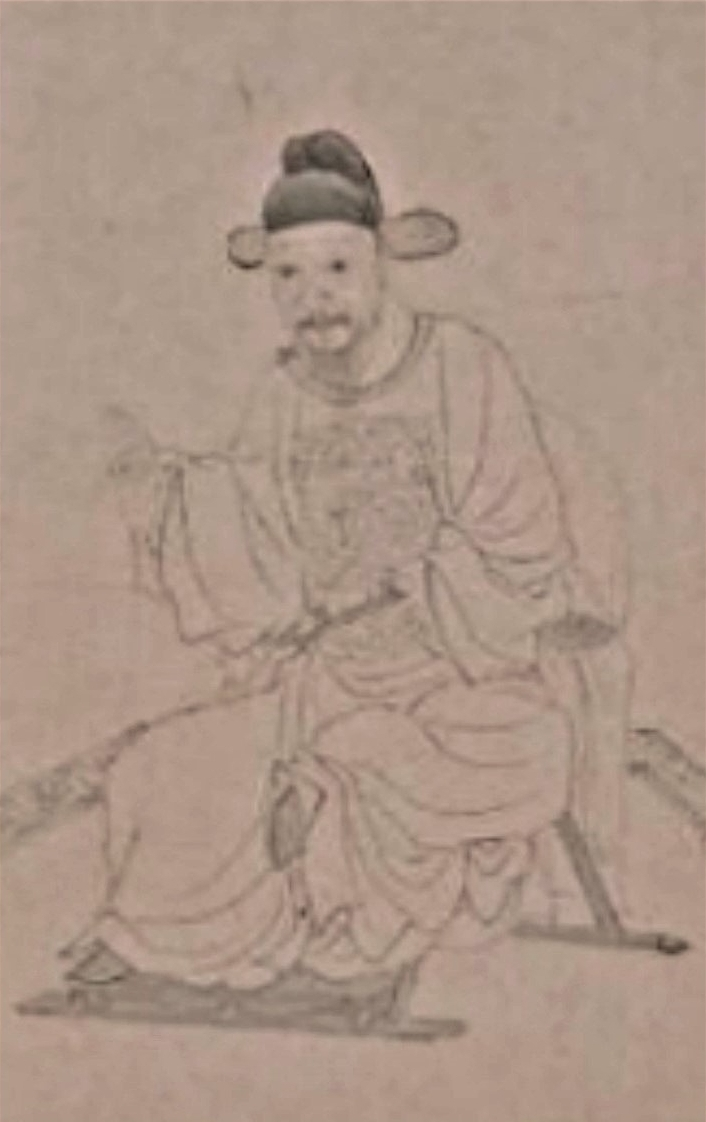

Zhang Han (張瀚, 1511–1593), courtesy name Ziwen (子文), art name Yuanzhou (元洲), was a leading scholar-official during the Ming dynasty (1368–1644) of China. Although eventually posted to serve in the capital at Beijing, Zhang was a native of the thriving commercial city of Hangzhou and a descendant of a wealthy family that ran a textile business. He was also a literary author, a painter, a follower of Chinese Buddhism, and an essayist while in retirement from office during his later years. According to the historian Timothy Brook, he was a "close observer of the changes of his age", in reference to China's intensified commercialism and consumption of commodities in the late Ming era and its effects upon Chinese culture.
