= Titta =

Titta may refer to:

== People ==
- Cesare De Titta (1862–1933), Italian poet in Italian, Latin and in Neapolitan Abruzzese
- Mastro Titta, nickname of Giovanni Battista Bugatti (1779–1869), Italian executioner
- Giovanni Titta Rosa (1891–1972), Italian literary critic, poet and novelist
- Titta Jokinen (born 1951), Finnish actress
- Titta Ruffo, Italian operatic baritone
- Titta As a part of Bahamian culture the word Titta is a title for the oldest sister (sometimes used before the name; mostly used alone).

== Places ==
- Titta (Città di Castello), frazione of the comune of Città di Castello in the Province of Perugia, Umbria, central Italy
