= Sanctuary of the Madonna di Belvedere, Città di Castello =

Coordinates: 43°28′41″N 12°16′00″E

The Sanctuary of the Madonna di Belvedere is a Baroque-style, Roman Catholic church built atop a mountain a few miles outside of the town of Città di Castello, province of Perugia, in the region of Umbria, Italy.

== History and Decoration ==
A chapel or oratory was present at this site since the 13th-century, sheltering a venerated icon, then called the Santa Maria di Caprano, for being present atop what was then Monte Caprano. From 1669 to 1684, the present temple was erected using a design by Antonio Gabrielli and Nicola Barbioni. In 1705, the icon was crowned in a ceremony in the cathedral, and after a week, led in procession back to the church.

The structure has an odd eclectic appearance, with a convex round facade with semicircular portico of seven rounded arches. Above the roofline is a triangular tympanum, followed by a cylindrical brick dome. This is flanked by two cylindrical turret like bell-towers.

Just inside the entrance to the church is a bussulo or compass made in 1883. The interior is octagonal. In the chapel to the right is an altarpiece depicting the Martyrdom of St Vincent (1699) by Giovanni Ventura Borghesi. The main altar has rich marble decoration and holds the venerated icon. It is surrounded by a profusion of animated statues of various saints including Donninus, Floridius, Amantius, and Venturam. From the front, one has a scenic view of the valley across to other Apennine peaks.
