= San Secondo =

San Secondo may refer to:

- San Secondo, Città di Castello, a frazione of the comune of Città di Castello, Italy
- San Secondo, Magnano, a church in the province of Biella, Italy
- San Secondo Parmense, a comune in the province of Parma, Italy
- San Secondo di Pinerolo, a comune in the province of Turin, Italy
- Isola di San Secondo, a deserted island in the Venetian Lagoon, Italy

== See also ==
- Secundus (disambiguation), the Latin name of several Catholic saints
