= Volterrano (disambiguation) =

Volterrano may refer to:

- Volterrano (Città di Castello), a Frazione in central Italy
- Raffaelo Volterrano, an Italian humanist
- Baldassare Franceschini, an Italian painter who is mostly known as "Volterrano"
- Berlinghiero Berlinghieri, an Italian painter who is also known as Berlinghiero Volterrano
