= Church and Monastery of the Zoccolanti, Città di Castello =

Church and monastery in Umbria, Italy

Coordinates: 43.446105°N 12.251526°E

The church and monastery of the Zoccolanti, also known as the Chiesa e monastero di San Giovanni Battista, is a Roman Catholic complex located about a kilometer South of the urban center of Città di Castello, near the road Sp106 leading to Perugia, in the Province of Perugia, region of Umbria, Italy.

The monastery, dedicated to St John the Baptist, was established by the Franciscan order of Observant Minorites, also known as the Zoccolanti. The church was erected between 1473 and 1529, but underwent significant modifications over the next two centuries. In 1687, the architect Nicola Barbioni added the present facade with a buttressed portico. In the monastery, the cloister derives from the original 15th-century construction.

The church an convent previously had a number of terracotta works from the studio of Andrea della Robbia, now on display in the Pinacoteca Comunale. Under the portico of the facade is a copy of the statue of St John the Baptist, the original was made in 1457 by Donatello for the Duomo di Siena.

During World War II, the allied bombardment of German forces adjacent to the monastery killed various adults and children seeking refuge in the monastery.
