= Pietralunga =

- Comune
- Comune di Pietralunga
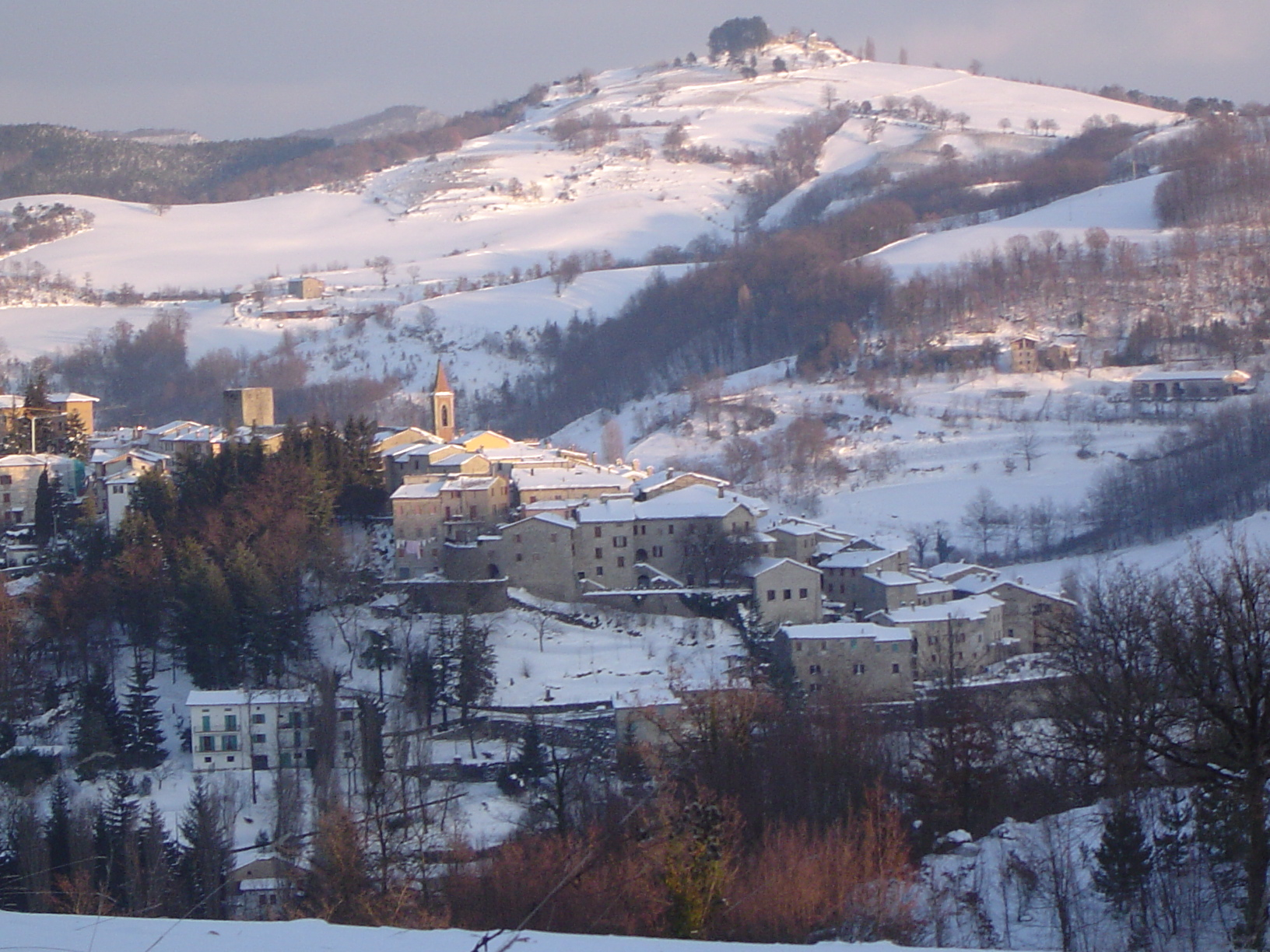
- View of Pietralunga

- Location within Italy Location within Umbria
- Coordinates: 43.442293°N 12.436764°E
- Country: Italy
- Region: Umbria
- Province: Perugia (PG)

Government
  - Mayor: Mirko Ceci

Area
  - Total: 140.2 km^{2} (54.1 sq mi)
- Elevation: 566 m (1,857 ft)

Population (1 January 2025)
  - Total: 2,014
  - Density: 14.37/km^{2} (37.21/sq mi)
- Demonym: Pietralunghesi
- Time zone: UTC+1 (CET)
  - Summer (DST): UTC+2 (CEST)
- Postal code: 06026
- Dialing code: 075
- Patron saint: Saint Gaudentius
- Saint day: 29 September
- Website: Official website

Pietralunga is a comune (municipality) in the Province of Perugia in the Italian region Umbria, located about 35 km (22 mi) north of Perugia.

== Etymology ==
The name Pietralunga was formerly Pratalonga ("long meadow" or "extensive pasture"), derived from the meadows that surrounded the settlement.

== History ==
Prehistoric remains have been found in the area of present-day Pietralunga, including a human-bone flute, hillforts, and worked stone objects.

Nearby, the Umbrians founded a settlement known as Tufi. During the Roman period it reached its peak as Forum Julii Concupiensium, located near Ca' Bartolla, and in the age of Augustus it was raised to the status of municipium. It is also mentioned by Pliny the Elder in the Natural History. This town was destroyed during the barbarian invasions of Late Antiquity.

Between the 6th and 7th centuries a new settlement was established on the present hilltop site under the name Plebs Tuphiae. In the 8th century the church of Santa Maria was constructed, along with a pentagonal Lombard fortress. The name later changed to Pratalonga, derived from the surrounding pasturelands.

Between the 11th and 14th centuries Pietralunga functioned as a self-governing municipality, with its own statutes and land registry.

In 1336 the inhabitants of Pietralunga submitted to Città di Castello, which later established it as a barony for administrative purposes; this arrangement lasted until its abolition in 1817. Prior to this period, the town was ruled by various local lords and by the counts Della Branca.

On 11 September 1334 Giovanni di Lorenzo de Picardie traveled through Pietralunga as part of the Ax Miracle of the Holy Face of Lucca.

A Benedictine nunnery was established in Pietralunga in the 13th century and later transferred to Città di Castello in 1574. In 1348 the Ubaldini attempted unsuccessfully to seize the territory from Città di Castello. Pietralunga obtained exemption from certain duties in 1383, and in 1402 it elected its own captain.

King Ladislaus of Naples also attempted to take possession of the town, as did the Bracceschi in the early 15th century. In 1439 reinforcements of 1,600 soldiers were sent to enable the town to resist Niccolò Piccinino. In 1482 the forces of the Church occupied Pietralunga, but they were expelled by Giovanni Vitelli, who restored it to Città di Castello.

In 1860 Pietralunga was annexed to the Kingdom of Italy. In 1895 Pietralunga had a population of 4,125 inhabitants.

== Geography ==
Pietralunga is situated on the slopes of the Apennines, near the course of the Busso, a tributary of the Cantiano. It is located about 20 kilometres (12 mi) west of Città di Castello, 20 kilometres (12 mi) south of Umbertide, 17 kilometres (11 mi) east of Gubbio, and 24 kilometres (15 mi) north of Cagli. The climate is temperate, and the prevailing winds are described as rather dry.

The surrounding territory is crossed by the Carpina river and the Carpinella stream.

Pietralunga borders the following municipalities: Apecchio, Cagli, Città di Castello, Gubbio, Montone, Umbertide.

=== Subdivisions ===
The municipality includes the frazioni of Castel Guelfo, Colle Antico, Corniole, San Biagio, San Faustino.

== Economy ==
In the 19th century the territory produced fruit in abundance, as well as pork, cheese, wool and flax seed, while wine production was limited and olive cultivation modest. Currants were particularly noted and sought after in neighboring areas.

== Religion and culture ==
The patron saint of Pietralunga Saint Gaudenzio, whose feast is celebrated on 29 September.

=== Santa Maria ===
The church of Santa Maria was founded in the 7th–8th century. Its current façade results from an early 20th-century modification that removed the original apse to create a new main entrance and closed the earlier one. The interior has an irregular rectangular plan with a single nave marked by heavy ribs supporting ogival vaults. A circular apse, formerly raised above the floor level, was demolished during the redesign.

The present flat, square presbytery occupies the area of the ancient entrance. The right wall contains an attributed work of Raffaellino del Colle depicting the martyrdom of Saint Sebastian. A copy of the polyptych by Ottaviano Nelli, transferred to the Galleria Nazionale dell'Umbria, is preserved in the presbytery.

The church preserves an organ, and also houses a gilded metal cross in Gothic style.

=== Madonna dei Rimedi ===
The sanctuary of the Madonna dei Rimedi, originally the pieve located about 2 kilometres (1.2 mi) south of the historic center, was built in the 7th–8th century. It later became a site of strong Marian devotion linked to reports of apparitions to young girls and to the Benedictine nuns of Santa Maria del Ponte. In the 17th century it was enlarged and renovated.

Positioned along a medieval route connecting the Adriatic and Tyrrhenian sides of the peninsula, it was traditionally believed to have hosted Francis of Assisi during his journeys to La Verna in the territory of Arezzo.

=== Pieve de' Saddi ===
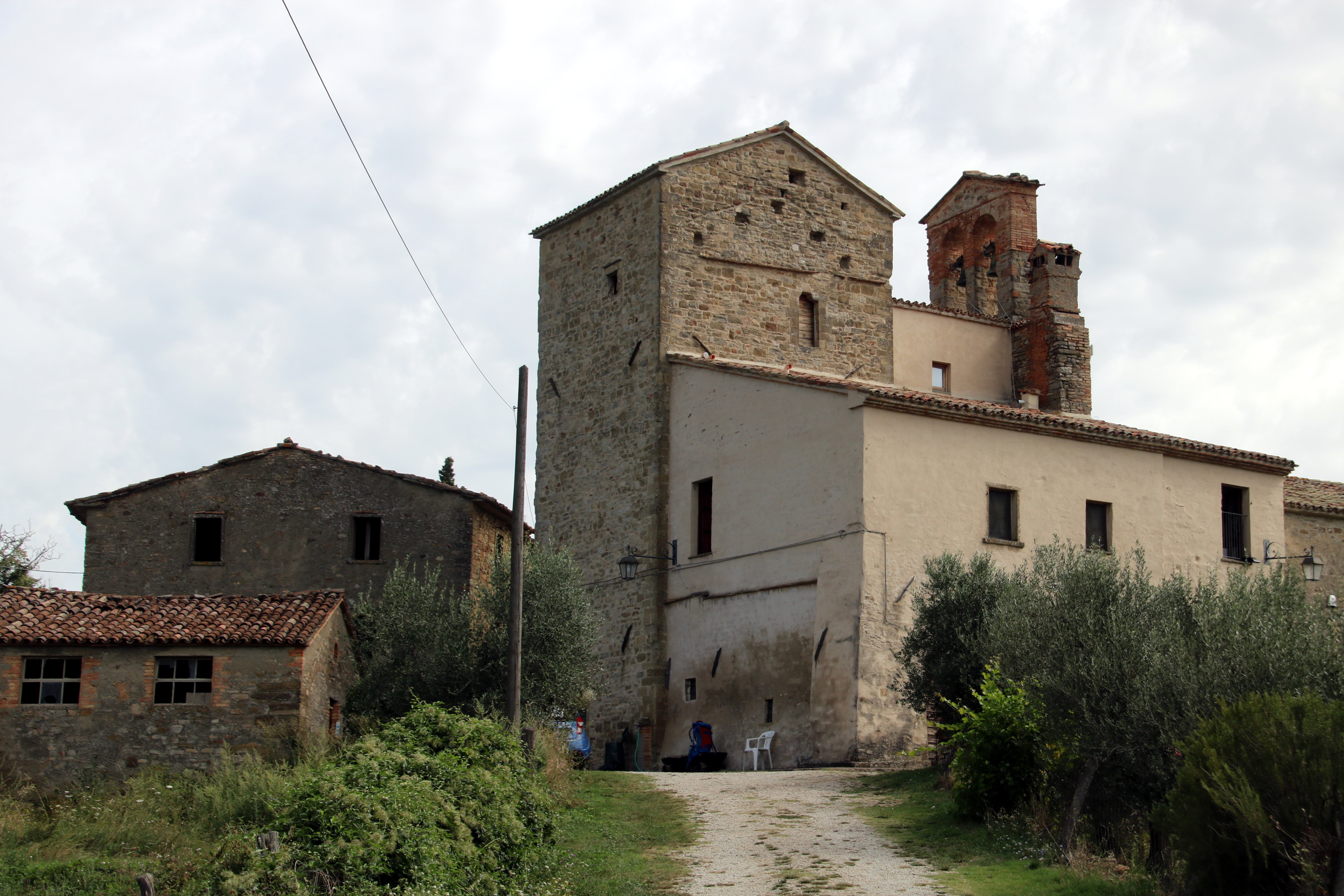
Pieve de' Saddi

Pieve de' Saddi lies southwest of the town and is one of the oldest churches in the area. Built in the 5th century on the remains of a Roman temple, it was intended to safeguard the remains of Saint Crescentinus, a Roman legionary said to have introduced Christianity to the region. A bas-relief from the 8th century inside the church depicts the saint killing the dragon near the gates of what is now Città di Castello. The surrounding Roman settlement was abandoned during the barbarian invasions, after which the community relocated to the hill where Pietralunga later developed.

At Pieve di Saddi a subterranean site is venerated as the burial place of Saints Crescentinus and Esuberanzio and other martyrs said to have been killed under Diocletian. The site was formerly a place of pilgrimage and is associated with Saint Ubald of Gubbio and Saint Florido, bishop of Città di Castello, who is said to have died there in 590.

=== Abbey of San Benedetto Vecchio ===
The abbey stands along the provincial road from Pietralunga to Reggio, on a hillside away from inhabited areas. Known as San Benedetto Vecchio or Monte Pellio, it underwent many alterations. The church has wooden trusses and ends with a semicircular apse. The exterior masonry varies, indicating that the oldest part is near the apse. Documented in 1191, the monastery prospered until the early 15th century. To safeguard the complex and its religious community, the municipality of Gubbio established a fortified tower which hosted a small military garrison between the 14th and 15th centuries.

=== Other heritage sites ===
The rocca is a pentagonal Longobard fortress dating to the 8th century and forms the core of the medieval settlement. Although altered over the centuries, it retains its distinctive pentagonal base. Remains of the original entrance gate survive near Piazza Fiorucci, together with a defensive and lookout tower. The ground level around the fortress has lowered over time due to excavations and building activity.

Porta del Cassero is the only surviving one of the three ancient gates. A 16th-century inscription on its left side records restoration works carried out on the gate and the surrounding walls.

The area is home to several ancient Roman ruins. Archaeological finds from the area are preserved in the Museo Archeologico in Perugia, including prehistoric materials and Umbrian artifacts such as the human-tibia flute.

Outside the walls lies the Candeleto pinewood, which hosts the ornithological museum.

== Notable people ==
Notable figures from Pietralunga include the Blessed Buccio Bonori family, bishop of Città di Castello from 1358 for sixteen years. The Fucci family also originated there and, during the civil conflicts, counterbalanced the power of the Vitelli.

Saint Crescentinus is said to have been killed near the town's center.
