= Lugnano =

Lugnano may refer to:

- Lugnano in Teverina, a municipality in the province of Terni, Italy
- Lugnano, Città di Castello, a village in the province of Perugia, Italy
- Lugnano, Vicopisano, a village in the province of Pisa, Italy
