= Vincenzo Barboni =

Italian painter (1802–1859)

Vincenzo Barboni (1802–1859) was an Italian painter, who mainly depicted sacred subjects in a Neoclassical style.

== Biography ==
Born in Città di Castello, he studied under Giuseppe Crosti. Later he studied with Tommaso Minardi at the Academy of Fine Arts of Perugia. Barboni moved to Rome along with Minardi, where he joined the Academy of St Luke.

For the Cathedral at Citta di Castello, Borboni painted a Virgin Mary and Christ Child with the Saints Florido, Amanzio and Crescenziano, which was placed above the side entrance but later relocated to the Sacristy. Among his other works in Città di Castello are the Martyrdom of St. Lawrence in the town hall, and a Madonna with Saints Eligius and Lucy in the Municipal Art Gallery (Pinacoteca Comunale).

He became Director of the Scuola di Disegno e Plastica in Città di Castello. After he died, his pupil Domenico Lambardo became director.
