= Cornetto, Città di Castello =

Cornetto
- Frazione
- Location within Italy
- Coordinates: 43°22′31″N 12°15′10″E
- Country: Italy
- Region: Umbria
- Province: Perugia
- Comune: Città di Castello
- Elevation: 270 m (890 ft)

Population (2001)
  - Total: 216
- Time zone: UTC+1 (CET)
  - Summer (DST): UTC+2 (CEST)
- Postcode: 06010
- Area code: 075

Cornetto (Italian pronunciation: [korˈnɛtto]) is a frazione of the comune of Città di Castello in the Province of Perugia, Umbria, central Italy. It stands at an elevation of 270 metres above sea level. At the time of the Istat census of 2001 it had 216 inhabitants.
