= Petrelle =

- Frazione
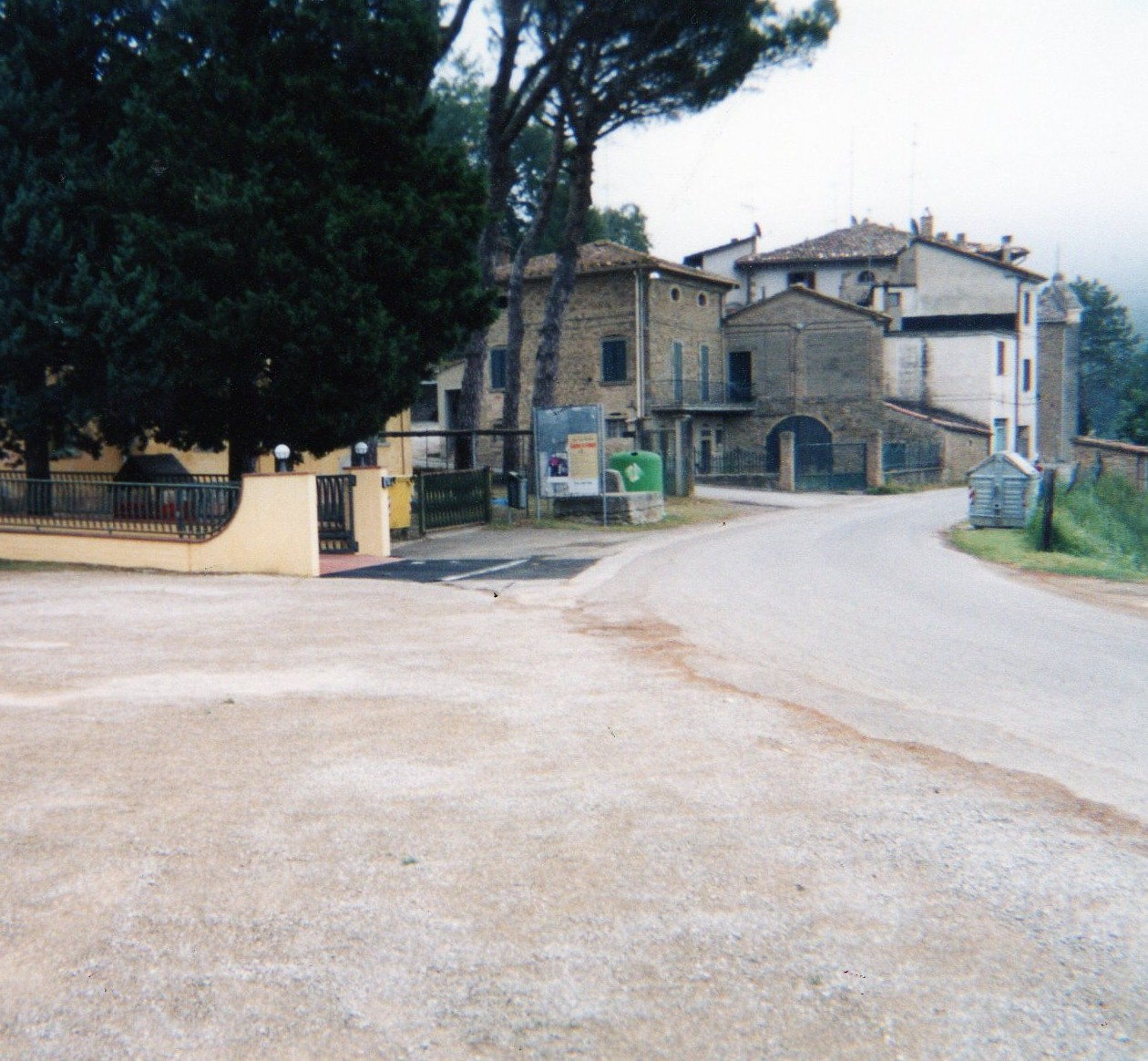
- Petrelle

- Location within Italy
- Coordinates: 43°20′52″N 12°09′47″E
- Country: Italy
- Region: Umbria
- Province: Perugia
- Comune: Città di Castello
- Elevation: 295 m (968 ft)

Population (2001)
  - Total: 81
- Time zone: UTC+1 (CET)
  - Summer (DST): UTC+2 (CEST)
- Postcode: 06010
- Area code: 075

Petrelle is a frazione of the comune of Città di Castello in the Province of Perugia, Umbria, central Italy. It stands at an elevation of 295 metres above sea level. At the time of the Istat census of 2001 it had 81 inhabitants.
