= Badia Petroia =

- Frazione
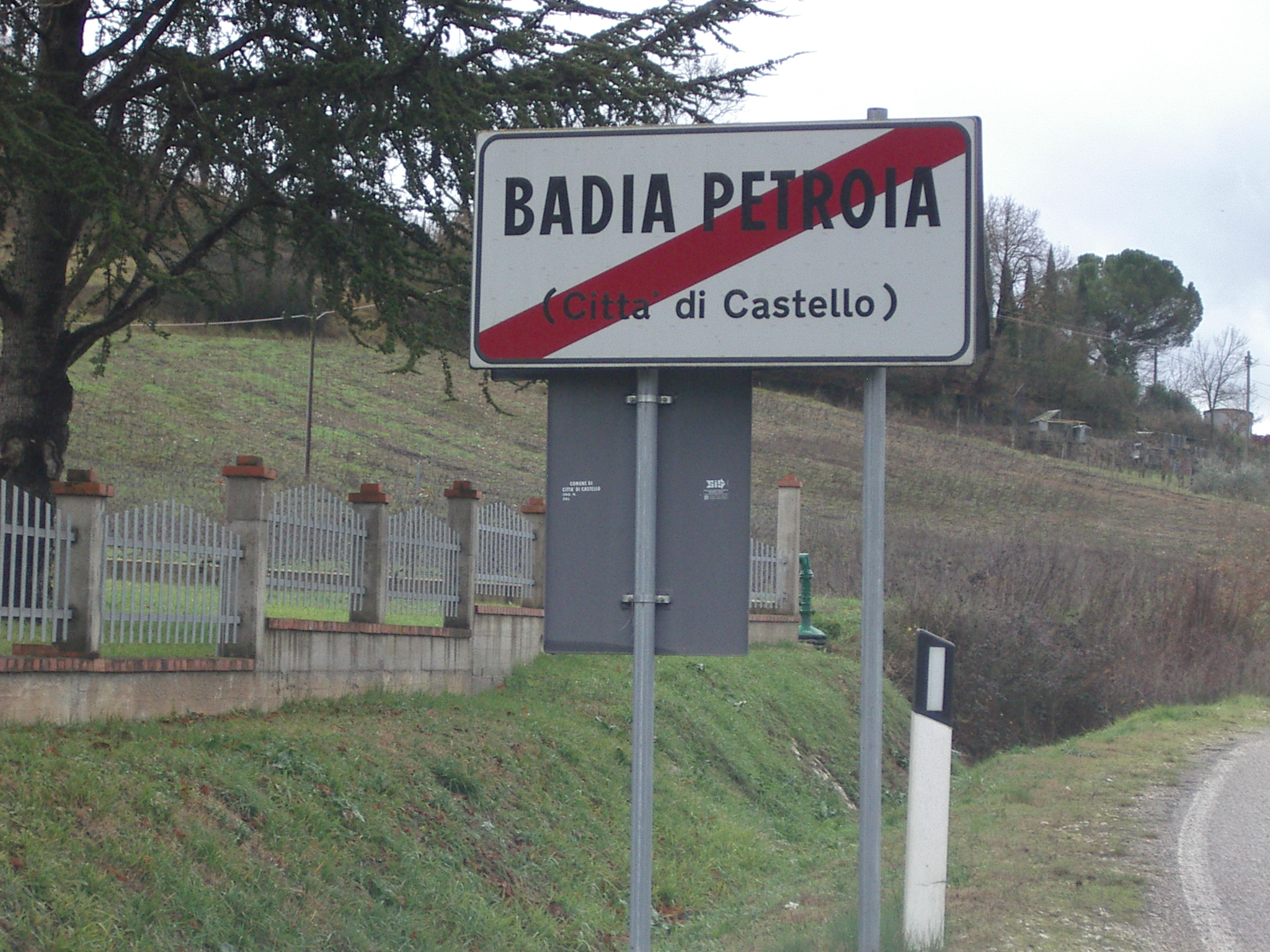
- Badia Petroia

- Location within Italy
- Coordinates: 43°22′47″N 12°10′4″E
- Country: Italy
- Region: Umbria
- Province: Perugia
- Comune: Città di Castello
- Elevation: 299 m (981 ft)

Population (2001)
  - Total: 172
- Time zone: UTC+1 (CET)
  - Summer (DST): UTC+2 (CEST)
- Postcode: 06010
- Area code: 075

Badia Petroia is a frazione of the comune of Città di Castello in the Province of Perugia, Umbria, central Italy. It stands at an elevation of 299 metres above sea level. At the time of the Istat census of 2001 it had 172 inhabitants.
