= Croce di Castiglione =

- Frazione
- Location within Italy
- Coordinates: 43°24′10″N 12°12′56″E
- Country: Italy
- Region: Umbria
- Province: Perugia
- Comune: Città di Castello
- Elevation: 362 m (1,188 ft)

Population (2001)
  - Total: 189
- Time zone: UTC+1 (CET)
  - Summer (DST): UTC+2 (CEST)
- Postcode: 06010
- Area code: 075

Croce di Castiglione is a frazione of the comune of Città di Castello in the Province of Perugia, Umbria, central Italy. It stands at an elevation of 362 metres above sea level. At the time of the Istat census of 2001 it had 189 inhabitants.
