= Cinquemiglia =

Cinquemiglia is a frazione of the comune of Città di Castello in the Province oPerugia, Umbria, central Italy. It stand at an elevation of 278 metres above sea level. At the time of the Istat census of 2001 it had 434 inhabitants.
