= Trestina, Città di Castello =

Trestina
- Frazione
- Location within Italy
- Coordinates: 43°22′13″N 12°05′18″E
- Country: Italy
- Region: Umbria
- Province: Perugia
- Comune: Città di Castello
- Elevation: 266 m (873 ft)

Population (2001)
  - Total: 1,816
- Time zone: UTC+1 (CET)
  - Summer (DST): UTC+2 (CEST)
- Postcode: 06010
- Area code: 075

Trestina (Italian pronunciation: [ˈtrɛstina]) is a frazione of the comune of Città di Castello in the Province of Perugia, Umbria, central Italy. It stands at an elevation of 266 metres above sea level. At the time of the Istat census of 2001 it had 1816 inhabitants.
