= Santa Lucia, Città di Castello =

Santa Lucia
- Frazione
- Location within Italy
- Coordinates: 43°25′11″N 12°14′54″E
- Country: Italy
- Region: Umbria
- Province: Perugia
- Comune: Città di Castello
- Elevation: 283 m (928 ft)

Population (2001)
  - Total: 232
- Time zone: UTC+1 (CET)
  - Summer (DST): UTC+2 (CEST)
- Postcode: 06010
- Area code: 075

Santa Lucia (Italian pronunciation: [ˈsanta luˈtʃiːa]) is a frazione of the comune of Città di Castello in the Province of Perugia, Umbria, central Italy. It stands at an elevation of 283 metres above sea level. At the time of the Istat census of 2001 it had 232 inhabitants.
