= Lerchi =

- Frazione
- Location within Italy
- Coordinates: 43°28′36″N 12°11′50″E
- Country: Italy
- Region: Umbria
- Province: Perugia
- Comune: Città di Castello
- Elevation: 293 m (961 ft)

Population (2001)
  - Total: 508
- Time zone: UTC+1 (CET)
  - Summer (DST): UTC+2 (CEST)
- Postcode: 06010
- Area code: 075

Lerchi is a frazione of the comune of Città di Castello in the Province of Perugia, Umbria, central Italy. It stands at an elevation of 293 meters above sea level. At the time of the Istat census of 2001 it counted 508 inhabitants.
