= San Leo Bastia =

- Frazione
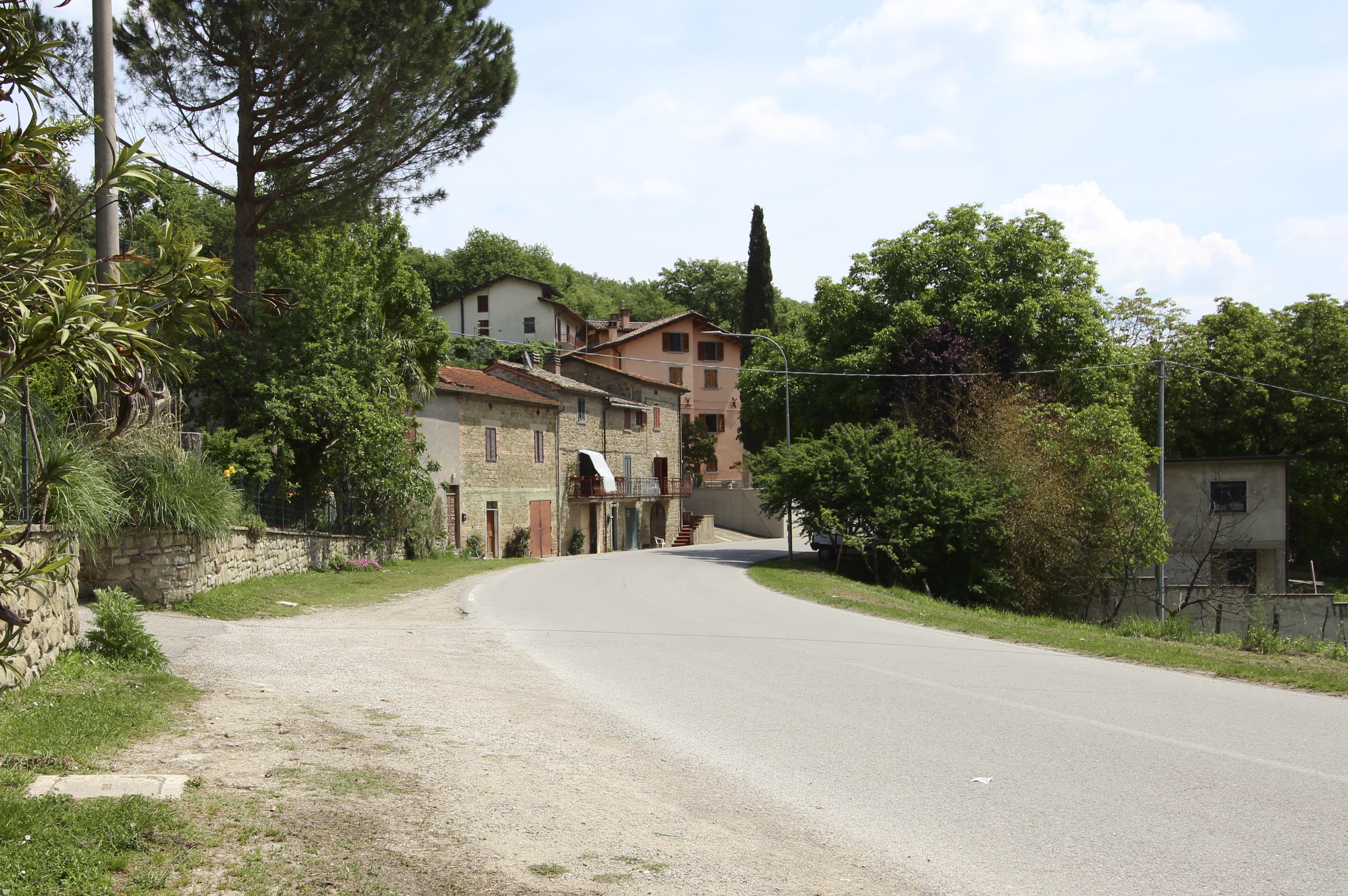
- San Leo Bastia

- Location within Italy
- Coordinates: 43°19′28″N 12°09′23″E
- Country: Italy
- Region: Umbria
- Province: Perugia
- Comune: Città di Castello
- Elevation: 320 m (1,050 ft)

Population (2001)
  - Total: 213
- Time zone: UTC+1 (CET)
  - Summer (DST): UTC+2 (CEST)
- Postcode: 06010
- Area code: 075

San Leo Bastia is a frazione of the comune of Città di Castello in the Province of Perugia, Umbria, central Italy. It stands at an elevation of 320 metres above sea level. At the time of the Istat census of 2001 it had 213 inhabitants.
