= Nicola Barbioni =

Italian architect

Nicola Barbioni (1637 - 29 August 1688) was an Italian architect, active in a Baroque-style mainly in his native Città di Castello in Umbria.

Nicola trained under Gabrielli Antonio, architect and scenographer, and with him completed the church of the Madonna di Belvedere. He also refurbished in 1668 the oratory of St Peter for the Oratorians. He completed the dome of the cathedral in 1680–1683 and designed the chapel of Santissimo Sacramento (1682-1685). He also worked on many other projects in this town including the facades of the Palazzo del Podestà and of the Church of the Zoccolanti. He died in Città di Castello.
