= Gregory Tifernas =

Italian humanist (1414–1464)

Gregory Tifernas (Latin: Gregorius Tiphernus; Italian: Gregorio Tifernate; Cortona, 1414 – Venice, 1464) was an Italian Renaissance humanist, of Greek ancestry, from the Italian city of Città di Castello (Tifernum in Latin, whence his surname).

He studied the Greek Classics under Manuel Chrysoloras and was the first teacher of Greek in France at the University of Paris in 1458. It appears that he only stayed a short time in Paris but it proved long enough to train several students who would carry on his work.

He translated Theophrastus' Physica into Latin under the title Physica Theophrasti e greco in latinam ab Gregorio Tifernio.
