= Bivio Lugnano =

- Frazione
- Location within Italy
- Coordinates: 43°22′27″N 12°12′05″E
- Country: Italy
- Region: Umbria
- Province: Perugia
- Comune: Città di Castello
- Elevation: 273 m (896 ft)

Population (2001)
  - Total: 156
- Time zone: UTC+1 (CET)
  - Summer (DST): UTC+2 (CEST)
- Postcode: 06010
- Area code: 075

Bivio Lugnano is a frazione of the comune of Città di Castello in the Province of Perugia, Umbria, central Italy. It stands at an elevation of 273 metres above sea level. At the time of the Istat census of 2001 it had 156 inhabitants.
