= Fraccano =

- Frazione
- Location within Italy
- Coordinates: 43°30′18″N 12°18′29″E
- Country: Italy
- Region: Umbria
- Province: Perugia
- Comune: Città di Castello
- Elevation: 551 m (1,808 ft)

Population (2001)
  - Total: 32
- Time zone: UTC+1 (CET)
  - Summer (DST): UTC+2 (CEST)
- Postcode: 06010
- Area code: 075

Fraccano is a frazione of the comune of Città di Castello in the Province of Perugia, Umbria, central Italy. It stands at an elevation of 551 metres above sea level. At the time of the Istat census of 2001 it had 32 inhabitants.
