= Giovanni Ventura Borghesi =

Italian painter

Giovanni Ventura Borghesi (October 29, 1640 – April 13, 1708) was an Italian painter of the Baroque period, active mainly in Rome.

== Biography ==
Born in Città di Castello, he was initially a pupil of the painter Giovanni Battista Pacetti (called Lo Sguazzino), but by 1665 had moved to Rome to worku under Pietro da Cortona. He lived in the parish of San Lorenzo in Lucina. After his master's death, he completed some of Cortona's unfinished work at the church of the Sapienza. He painted an Annunciation and Coronation of the Virgin for the chapel of the Santissima Annunziata in the church of San Nicola da Tolentino in Rome. He also painted in Germany.

In Citta di Castello, he painted a St Francesco Solano for the church of San Giovanni Battista of the Zoccolanti.
