= Fabbrecce =

- Frazione
- Location within Italy
- Coordinates: 43°22′50″N 12°14′16″E
- Country: Italy
- Region: Umbria
- Province: Perugia
- Comune: Città di Castello
- Elevation: 265 m (869 ft)

Population (2001)
  - Total: 303
- Time zone: UTC+1 (CET)
  - Summer (DST): UTC+2 (CEST)
- Postcode: 06012
- Area code: 075

Fabbrecce is a frazione of the comune of Città di Castello in the Province of Perugia, Umbria, central Italy. It stands at an elevation of 265 metres above sea level. At the time of the Istat census of 2001, it had 303 inhabitants.
