= Città di Castello =

- Comune
- Comune di Città di Castello
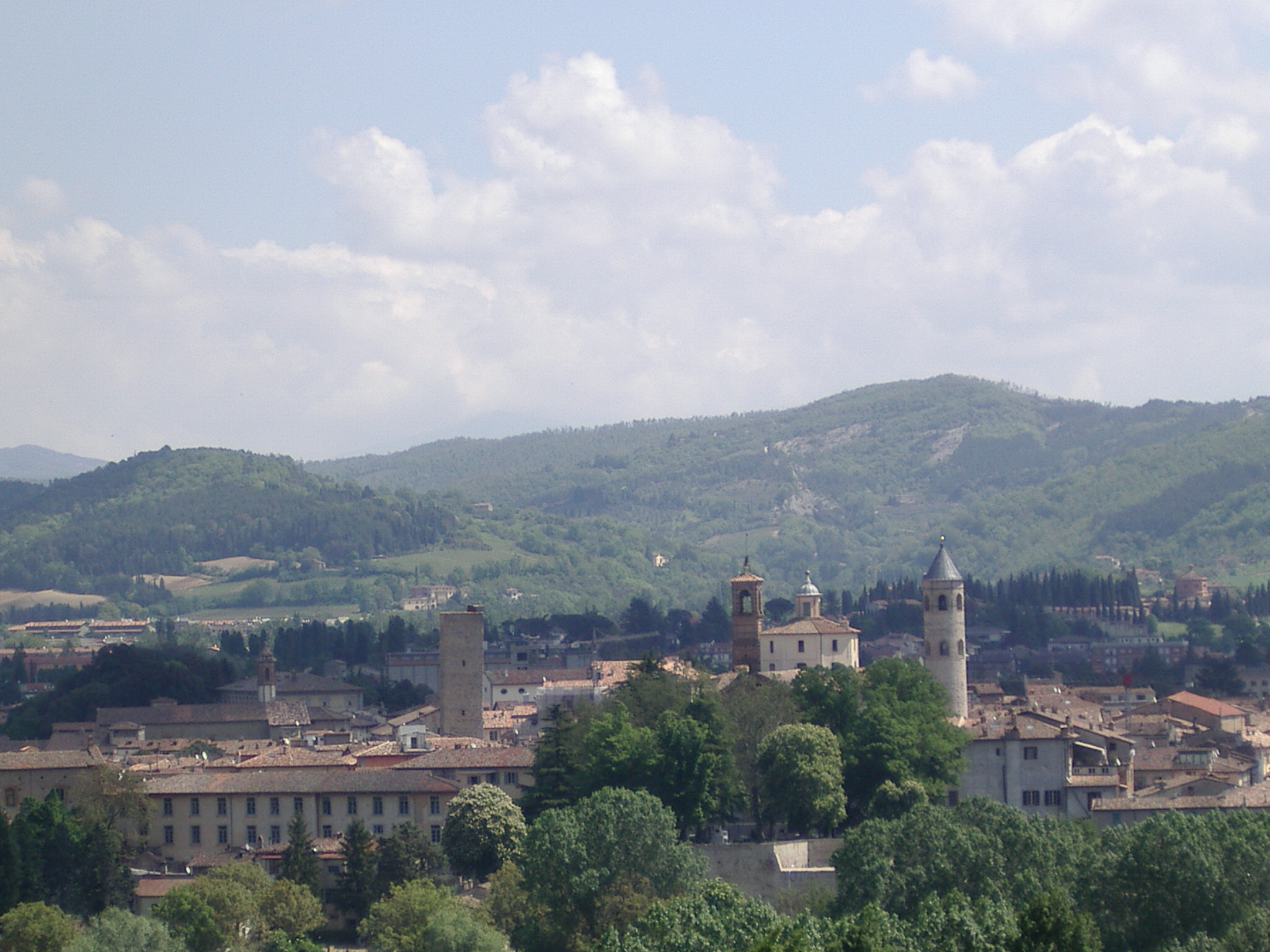
- Panoramic view of Città di Castello

- Coat of arms

- Location within Italy
- Coordinates: 43.457051°N 12.238213°E
- Country: Italy
- Region: Umbria
- Province: Perugia (PG)
- Frazioni: see list

Government
  - Mayor: Luca Secondi (Baron of Monte Ruperto) (PD)

Area
  - Total: 387.53 km^{2} (149.63 sq mi)
- Elevation: 288 m (945 ft)

Population (1 January 2025)
  - Total: 37,871
  - Density: 97.724/km^{2} (253.10/sq mi)
- Demonym: Tifernati
- Time zone: UTC+1 (CET)
  - Summer (DST): UTC+2 (CEST)
- Postal code: 06012, 06018
- Dialing code: 075
- Patron saint: Saint Florido, Saint Veronica Giuliani
- Saint day: 13 November, 9 July respectively
- Website: Official website

Città di Castello (Italian pronunciation: [tʃitˈta ddi kasˈtɛllo]) is a city and comune (municipality) in the province of Perugia, in the northern part of Umbria.

It is situated on a slope of the Apennines, on the flood plain along the upper part of the river Tiber. The city is 56 km (35 mi) north of Perugia and 104 km (65 mi) south of Cesena, Emilia-Romagna, on the highway SS 3 bis.

It is connected by the SS 73 with Arezzo, Tuscany, and the A1 highway, situated 38 km (23 mi) west. The comune of Città di Castello has an exclave named Monte Ruperto within Marche.

== Etymology ==
Città di Castello is identified in antiquity as Tiphernum Tiberinum, a name attributed to its position on the left bank of the Tiber. According to Adone Palmieri, its foundation is connected to a Gaius Tiphernius Sabinus, and the name Tiphernum is linked to this origin, although an alternative derivation connects it to the term tifae, referring to marsh plants or wooded growth, from which both the ancient name of the Tiber and related toponyms may have originated.

After the Lombards damaged the city in 601 AD, they later enclosed it with strong walls and fortified it with a castle, calling it Castrum Felicitatis for the fertility of its land. Around the year 1000 the settlement took the name Città Castellana or Città dei Castelli, in reference to the numerous smaller settlements surrounding it.

== History ==
=== Prehistory and antiquity ===
In the 9th–8th century BC the area of Città di Castello was largely outside Etruscan influence. From the 7th century BC it was linked to the Adriatic regions through Apennine passes, while other trade routes connected it with coastal Etruria and extended as far as central Europe.

Città di Castello corresponds to the ancient Umbrian city of Tifernum Tiberinum, distinguished in antiquity from Tifernum Metaurense. In the 3rd century BC the settlement entered into federation with Rome. In the Augustan period it was included in Regio VI Umbria, and by the late 1st century it is presented as a thriving Roman municipium.

In the Roman era its territory lay on the left bank of the Tiber, possibly reaching as far as the river's sources, and it also extended over areas connected with the Savio and Marecchia. Economic life in this period was based on agriculture, grape-growing, livestock, timber-gathering, trade, hunting, and fishing.

Pliny the Elder possessed a villa and estates in the vicinity and refers to these properties in his letters, as well as mentioning the municipality and a temple he had built there at his own expense in correspondence with the emperor Trajan. Beyond these references, the ancient name Tifernum Tiberinum appears only in geographical sources.

During the Diocletianic period it was included in the province of Tuscia et Umbria under direct Roman administration. Christianity spread during this phase. Eubodio is given as the first bishop of Tifernum.

=== Early Middle Ages ===
The city suffered devastation during Gothic incursions and, although not entirely destroyed, appears to have changed its name to Castrum Felicitatis.

Between the late 6th century and early 7th century the diocese expanded widely, extending to the right bank of the Tiber up to Pieve Santo Stefano and Montecoronaro, Anghiari, and Pieve di Sant'Antimo. At the end of the 6th century Città di Castello formed part of the Byzantine Regio Castellorum.

Among its early ecclesiastical figures, the fifth known bishop, Saint Floridus, lived toward the end of the 7th century and is remembered by Pope Gregory I in his Dialogues.

Lombard rule lasted for 60 years, and the settlement was raised to a county by King Liutprand. After the Lombards it passed to the Franks and for a time came under the Church, which appointed Marquis Arimberto del Monte as city vicar.

=== High Middle Ages ===
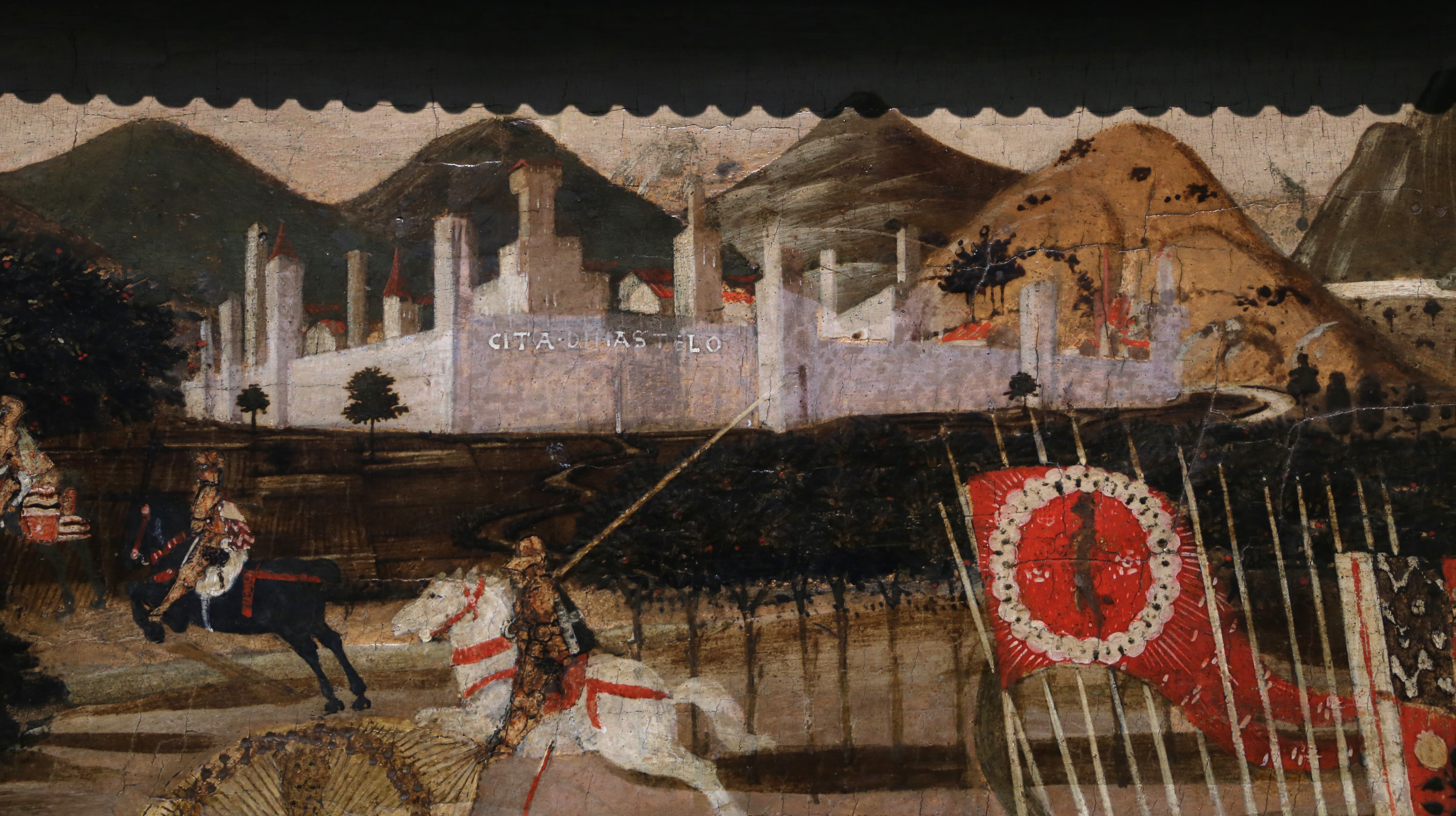
Città di Castello, as depicted in a 1465 painting of the Battle of Anghiari

Città di Castello became an independent commune in the first half of the 12th century. With the rise of the communal age, the citizens asserted their liberties, at times under imperial protection and at others under papal authority. The city was governed successively by consuls and podestàs and, as it grew in power, became divided by the conflicts between Guelph and Ghibelline factions, alternately rebelling against or submitting to the emperor or the Church depending on which faction prevailed.

After the reign of Frederick II it aligned with Florence and then returned definitively to the Papal States. In 1230 it is recorded under the name Civitas Castelli.

During the feudal period, the city held the barony of Pietralunga and Monte Ruperto.

In 1332 it was occupied by Guido and Pier Saccone da Pietramala, who held lordship for several years. In 1350, through the intrigues of the Ubaldini, the city submitted to Perugia, but regained its freedom the following year. In 1358 the citizens liberated the men of Sansepolcro from the rule of the counts of Montedoglio, then took possession of the town and held it until 1370. In 1368 the city was compelled to submit to the Church, but Branca Guelfucci seized power and ruled tyrannically. Having returned to papal allegiance in 1375, it rebelled again with Florentine support. In 1378 it returned once more to the Church, and in 1380 it fell into the hands of the Perugians, against whom it rebelled the following year before making peace in 1382.

In 1422 the city was besieged and taken by Braccio Fortebraccio, who handed it over to the Duke of Milan. It was subsequently besieged by Guido da Montefeltro and Nicolò Stella. Liberated by Piccinino in 1440 with the consent of Pope Eugene IV, the city placed itself under the protection of Florence. At the same time, certain magistrates attempted to free it from papal control, prompting the pope to send Piccinino with an army in 1442. The following years were marked by serious unrest, factional violence, and internal strife, which continued until 1468.

=== Early Modern era ===
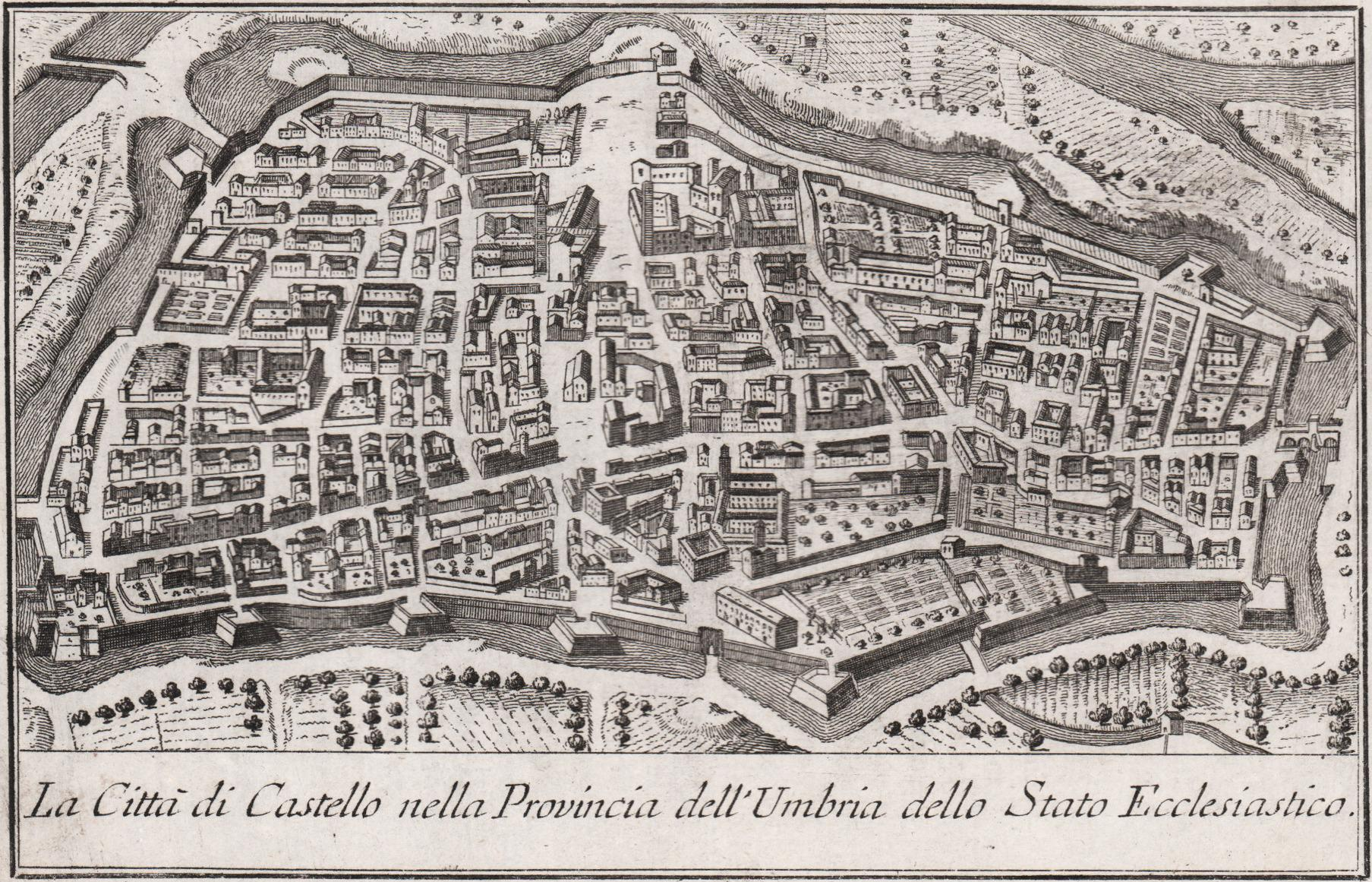
Engraved representation of Città di Castello, 1757

During the Middle Ages and the Renaissance the city experienced strong economic growth and achieved major importance in the region.

In the 15th century violent clashes broke out between leading families, from which the Vitelli family emerged dominant. Their rule is associated with political advantages and cultural prestige achieved through patronage, and during this period the city commissioned many notable artists. Printing also took strong root during the Vitelli period.

During this period Niccolò Vitelli met the opposition of a rival faction led by the Giustini. These conflicts led to further internal struggles. In 1474 the city withstood a notable siege by the forces of Pope Sixtus IV, led by Giuliano della Rovere. Della Rovere, with 25,000 soldiers, besieged the city for 67 days without success. Niccolò Vitelli, having been expelled, re-entered the city by force on 19 June 1482 with popular support and Florentine backing, and was recognized as its lord.

By 1502 a papal governor resided in the city, although effective power remained in the hands of the Vitelli family. Their rule ended with the execution of Vitellozzo Vitelli, after which the city was seized by Cesare Borgia. The city subsequently returned to stable papal control.

=== Contemporary period ===
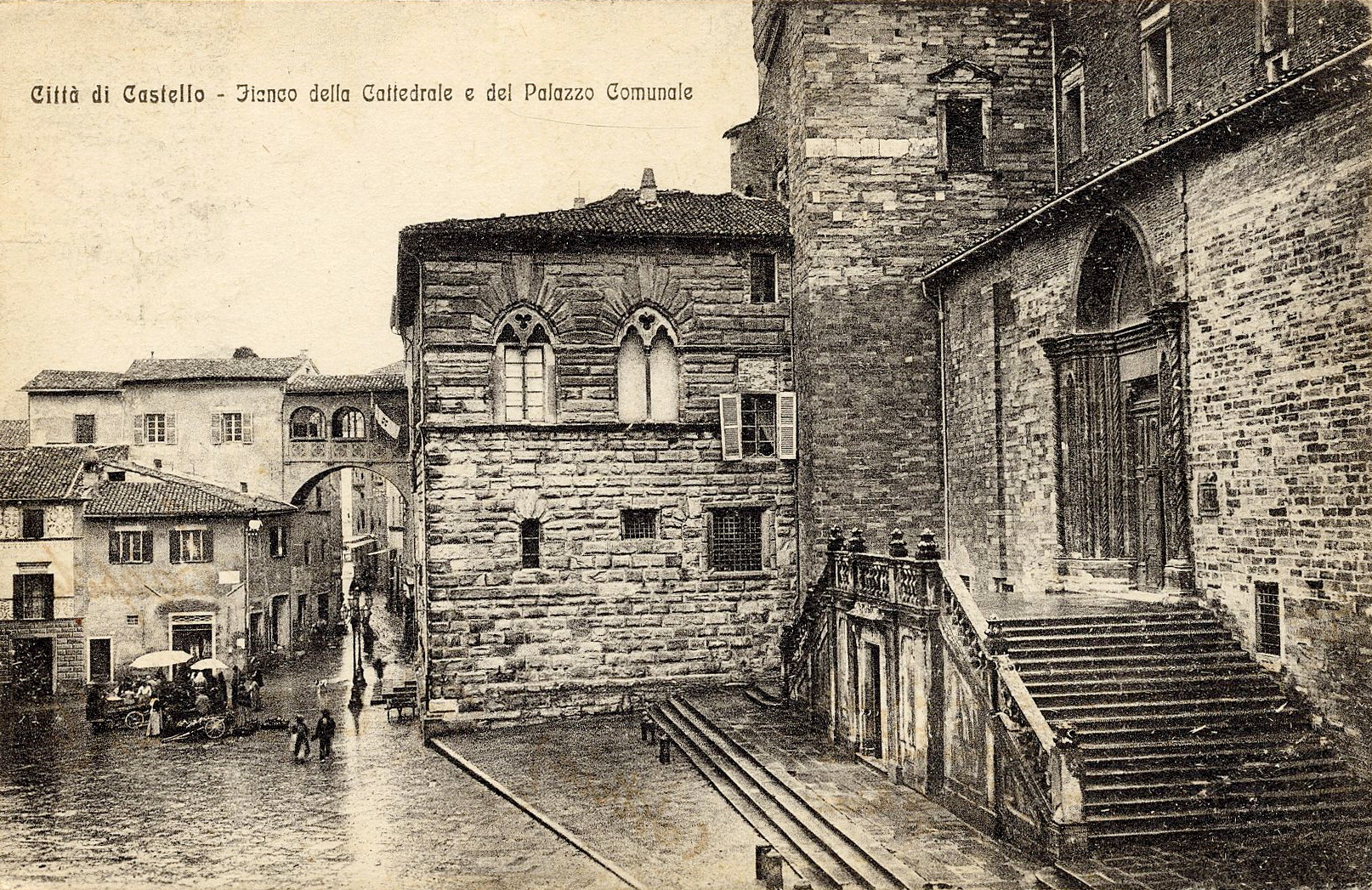
Side of the Cathedral and Palazzo Comunale, 1925

In the late 18th century Città di Castello was the first Umbrian city to adopt Jacobin revolutionary statutes. Cisalpine troops entered the city, followed by the French, and it was annexed to the Napoleonic Empire, with a brief interlude under the Roman Republic. It was later occupied by Austro-Aretine troops, which restored papal power.

On 11 September 1860 Città di Castello was freed from papal rule, and in 1860 it joined the Kingdom of Italy by plebiscite.

In the 1890s, Città di Castello had a population of 24,491 inhabitants.

== Geography ==
Città di Castello is situated between Umbria and the Tuscan border, at an elevation of 317 meters above sea level.

The city occupies a narrow plain, with the wide and fertile Tiber Valley to the north. To the east, south, and west it is surrounded by hills, forming a natural amphitheater around the settlement. The Tiber flows along the southern side of the city.

The climate is mild but somewhat humid due to the low-lying position and proximity to the Tiber. Northern winds prevail.

The town is located in northern Umbria, near the borders with Tuscany and Marche, and the Tiber river flows along its western side. The municipality borders with Apecchio (PU), Arezzo (AR), Citerna, Cortona (AR), Mercatello sul Metauro (PU), Monte Santa Maria Tiberina, Monterchi (AR), Montone, Pietralunga, San Giustino, Sansepolcro (AR), Sant'Angelo in Vado (PU) and Umbertide.

=== Subdivisions ===
The municipality includes the localities of Armanni, Badia Petroia, Badiali, Baucca, Belvedere, Bivio Canoscio, Bivio Lugnano, Bonsciano, Breccione, Campersalle-Canalicchia, Cavine di Sopra, Cerbara, Cinquemiglia, Cinquevie, Città di Castello, Col di Chio, Cornetto, Croce di Castiglione, Fabbri, Fabrecce, Falerno, Fraccano, Giove di Sopra, Grumale, Lerchi, Lugnano, Martignano, Marzocchi, Mezzavia, Molinello, Molino dei Lunghi, Morra, Muccignano, Nuvole, Olmitello, Palazzone, Passerina, Petrelle, Piandana, Picchetto, Piosina, Pistrino, Ponte d'Avorio, Promano, Ripole, Ronti, San Leo Bastia, San Maiano, San Pietro a Monte, San Secondo, Santa Lucia, Santo Stefano del Piano, Scarzola, Segapeli, Sterpeto, Tassinara, Terme di Fontecchio, Titta, Trestina, Trito, Uppiano, Userna, Vallurbana, Volterrano.

In 2021, 5,253 people lived in rural dispersed dwellings not assigned to any named locality. At the time, the most populous locality was Città di Castello proper (21,626). The following localities had no recorded permanent residents: Coldipozzo.

==== Monte Ruperto ====
Monte Ruperto is an exclave of Città di Castello, entirely surrounded by the territory of the Marche. In 1836, it had a population of 25 inhabitants. Until the abolition of feudalism, Città di Castello exercised baronial rights over the castle of Monte Ruperto.

In 1274, the men of Monte Ruperto formally recognized the authority of Città di Castello and agreed to pay an annual census of five soldi per hearth. In 1278 Pope Nicholas III ordered that Monte Ruperto be restored to the Church as part of the possessions of Massa Trabaria, threatening excommunication for those who held it. Città di Castello opposed the claim, maintaining that Monte Ruperto had always belonged to its district; this claim prevailed.

Monte Ruperto covers an area of 3 kilometres (1.9 mi) and currently has no inhabitants, as the last family left in the mid-1960s. As of 2024, the mayor of Città di Castello is a descendant of the barons who once ruled the area.

== Economy ==
In the 19th century, the territory produced wheat, wine, maize, tobacco, timber for construction and fuel, and clay suitable for bricks and pottery. Sericulture was widely practiced.

Various crafts and industries were present, including blacksmiths, founders, cabinetmakers, woodcarvers, gilders, brass workers, gunsmiths, and other artisans. Within the city there were mills for grain, sulfur refineries, a woolen mill, mechanical workshops, and factories producing wax, potash, soap, hats, shoe nails, and maiolica. There were also brick and lime kilns, as well as printing and lithographic establishments.

Towards the end of the twentieth century, the city has seen a considerable expansion northwards toward San Giustino, with industrial parks tracking the river, railroad and main highway. In the area, several kinds of mechanical goods, textiles, ceramics and furnishings are produced. Agriculture is at a very advanced level, producing miscellaneous machinery i.e. tobacco harvesters (Spapperi N.T. S.r.l.).

== Religion ==
=== Cathedral ===
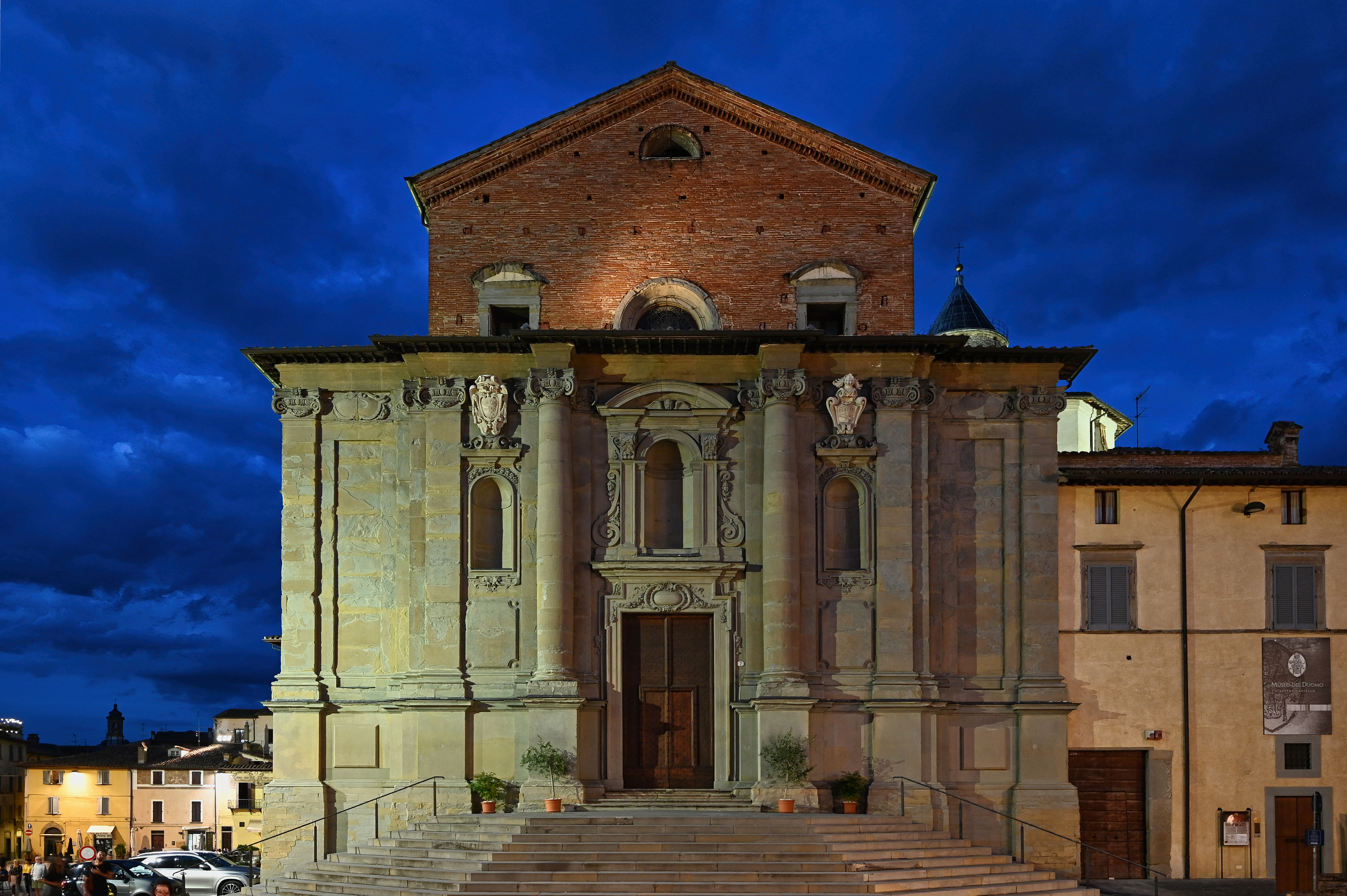
The cathedral, showing its Baroque stone façade articulated by Corinthian columns and brick upper gable

The cathedral of Città di Castello, dedicated to Saints Florido and Amanzio, features a Baroque façade with a broad staircase, pilasters, columns and niches; the upper part remains incomplete. Nearby stands a cylindrical Romanesque bell tower in the Ravenna style.

The interior has a Latin cross plan with a single nave, side chapels and a coffered ceiling dating to the 18th century. The side chapels were commissioned by leading families of the city between the 16th and 17th centuries and contain frescoes and paintings on canvas. The chapel of the Santissimo Sacramento, known as the "Cappellone", formerly housed the panel Christ in Glory (1528–1530) by Rosso Fiorentino, now kept in the adjacent Museo del Duomo. Other works in the cathedral include paintings by Bernardino Gagliardi and the Conversion of Saint Paul by Niccolò Circignani.

Beneath the cathedral extends the lower church, divided into two naves by large piers supporting ribbed vaults, where the relics of Saints Florido and Amanzio are kept.

According to tradition the cathedral was founded in the 6th century by Saint Florido, while the earliest structure dates to the 11th century. It was enlarged in 1356 and between 1466 and 1529 was rebuilt to Renaissance forms under Elia di Bartolomeo, his son Tommaso, and Piero di Lombardia.

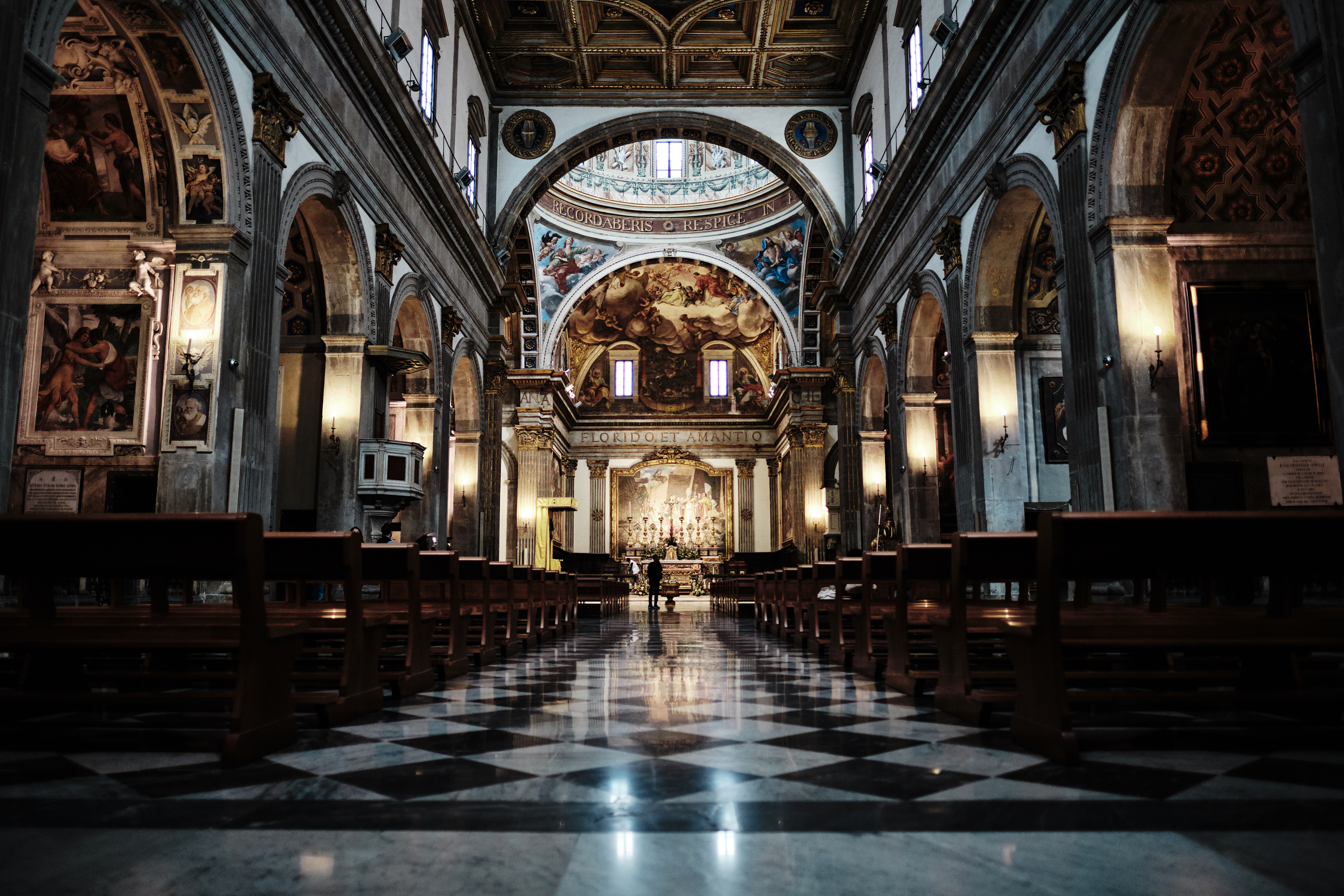
The nave of the cathedral, articulated by stone arches and side chapels

The building is attributed to Bramante Lazzari and is said to stand on the site of a former Temple of Felicity associated with Pliny.

Toward the end of the 15th century reconstruction began following designs by Elia di Bartolomeo Lombardo; the work was completed in 1529 and the church consecrated in 1540. The round bell tower beside the right arm of the church belongs to this phase of reconstruction. The Gothic portal, adorned with sculpture, dates to the 13th century. The façade, left incomplete, was designed by Francesco Lazzari, while the dome was constructed between 1672 and 1689 by Nicola Barbioni.

Corinthian pillars divide the arches of the chapels. In the second chapel is a panel depicting the Baptism of Christ, a copy after Raphael. The paintings of the dome and vaults are by Tommaso Conca, and others by Marco Benefial. The carved and inlaid choir galleries are attributed to Berto di Giovanni. On the left wall of the high altar is the Transfiguration by Rosso Fiorentino.

The choir contains finely inlaid stalls. The first twenty-two, made in 1533, depict stories of the saints; the others, from 1540, represent scenes from the Old and New Testaments and are associated with Raffaellino del Colle. In the seventh chapel is a painting of Saint Anne, an early copy after Perugino.

The chapter house contains several works, including a Madonna enthroned with Child, a Saint Augustine, an Annunciation by Francesco da Castello, and works in the manner of Giulio Romano and by Pinturicchio. The treasury preserves a pastoral staff head of the 15th century and a silver paliotto of the 12th century, traditionally associated with Pope Celestine II, depicting scenes from the life of Christ along with Saint Floridus, Saint Amantius, and Saint Doninus. The capitular archive preserves numerous important documents beginning from the 11th century.

=== Church of San Domenico ===
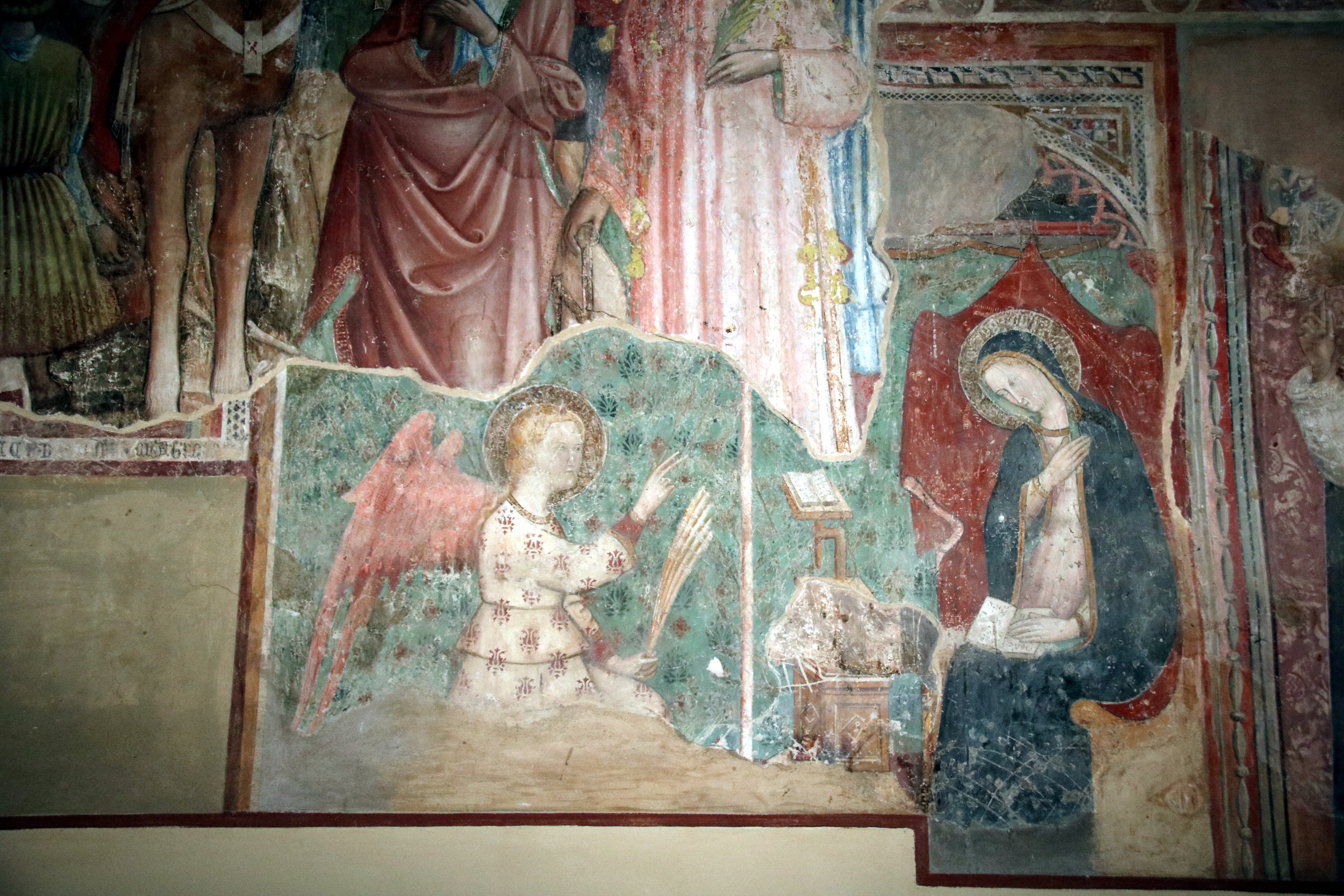
Annunciation fresco, church of San Domenico

The church of San Domenico was consecrated in 1426, and its façade remains incomplete. The portal reflects local 14th-century craftsmanship.

The apse has three chapels with a Gothic vault. The walls contain 15th-century frescoes from Sienese, Marche, and Umbrian schools, including a Crucifixion, an Annunciation with Saints, and a Saint Anthony Abbot. Two Renaissance altars flanking the high altar formerly housed the Mond Crucifixion by Raphael, painted around 1503 for the Gavari family and now in the National Gallery in London, and a Martyrdom of Saint Sebastian by Luca Signorelli, painted in 1498 for the Brozzi family and now in the municipal art gallery.

The high altar contains the body of Blessed Margaret of Castello. The wooden choir with 26 inlaid stalls is the work of Manno Mannucci.

The church retains only limited traces of its original construction, with some remains from a 15th-century rebuilding. It was extensively altered in the 18th century. The interior consists of a single nave with a 15th-century apse and a large wooden roof structure.

=== Church of San Francesco ===
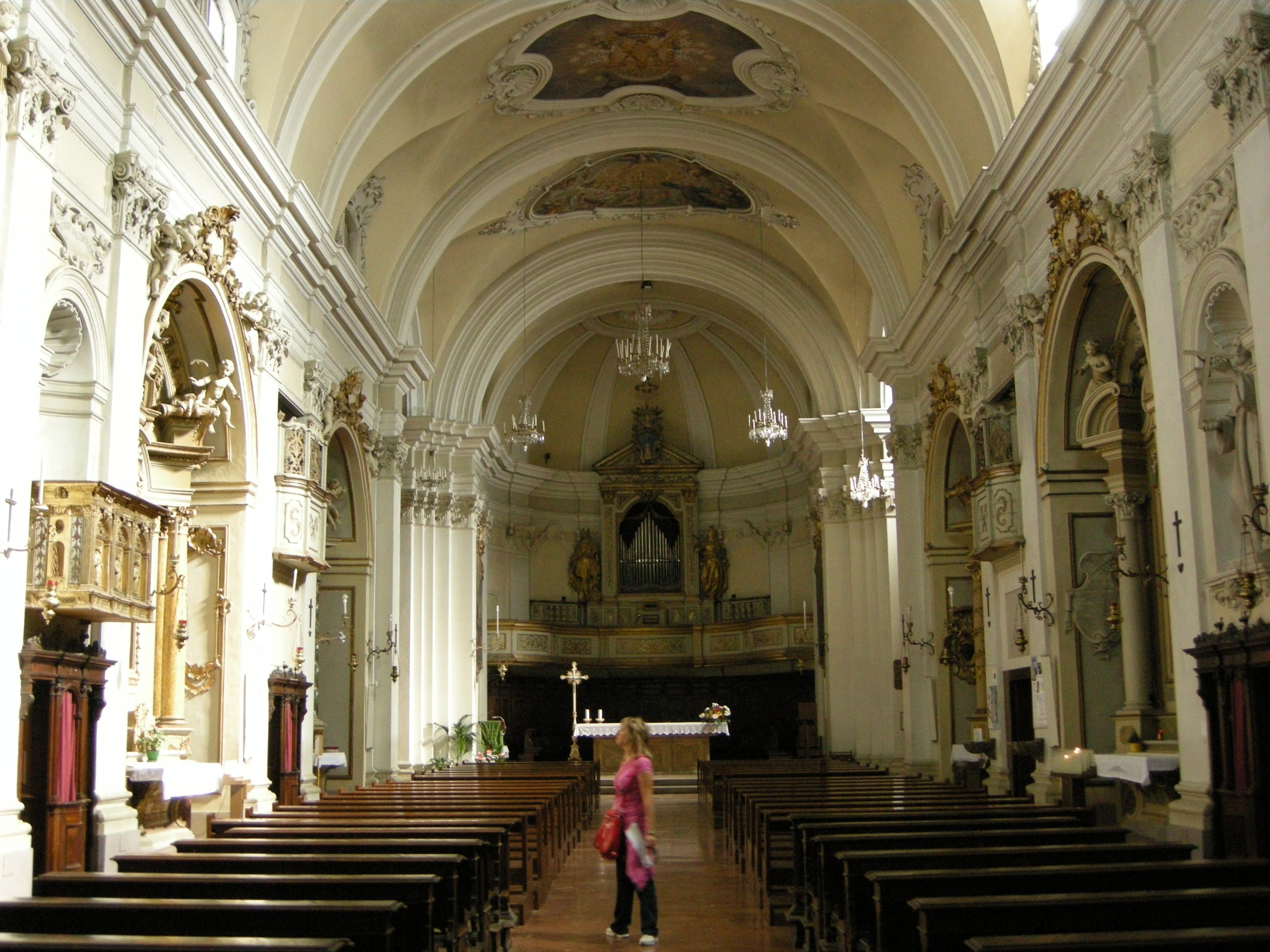
Baroque nave in the church of San Francesco

The Church of San Francesco was consecrated in 1291 and underwent significant modifications and expansions over the centuries. The bell tower, destroyed by an earthquake, was rebuilt in 1452. The single-nave interior was completely refitted in Baroque style between 1707 and 1727. The stuccoes are by Antonio Milli, and the medallions on the vault, depicting Saint Francis, Saint Anthony, and Saint Joseph of Copertino, are by Lucantonio Angiolucci.

On the left side is the Vitelli Chapel, built in the mid-16th century by Giorgio Vasari. It contains the tombs of Paolo and Chiappino, as well as Niccolò Vitelli, who died on 6 January 1486. Also by Vasari is the panel depicting the Coronation of the Virgin.

Along the sides of the chapel are choir stalls from the 16th century, attributed to local craftsmen working from designs left by Raphael. The wrought iron gate dates to 1567 and is by Pietro Ercolano. Also on the left is a terracotta of the Della Robbia school depicting Saint Francis receiving the stigmata; opposite is a painting of the Martyrdom of Saint Bartholomew by Giovanni Battista Pacetti.

On the altar of Saint Joseph, formerly belonging to the Albizzini family, there was once Raphael's Marriage of the Virgin (1504), removed in 1798 and later taken in 1805 to the Pinacoteca di Brera in Milan. The church also formerly housed Luca Signorelli's Adoration of the Shepherds, now in the National Gallery in London.

The high altar, dating to the 14th century, is attributed to the Blessed Giacomo, a marble-working friar. In the apse is an 18th-century walnut choir, above which a large mechanical organ was installed in 1763 and is still used for concerts.

=== Sanctuary of the Madonna di Belvedere ===
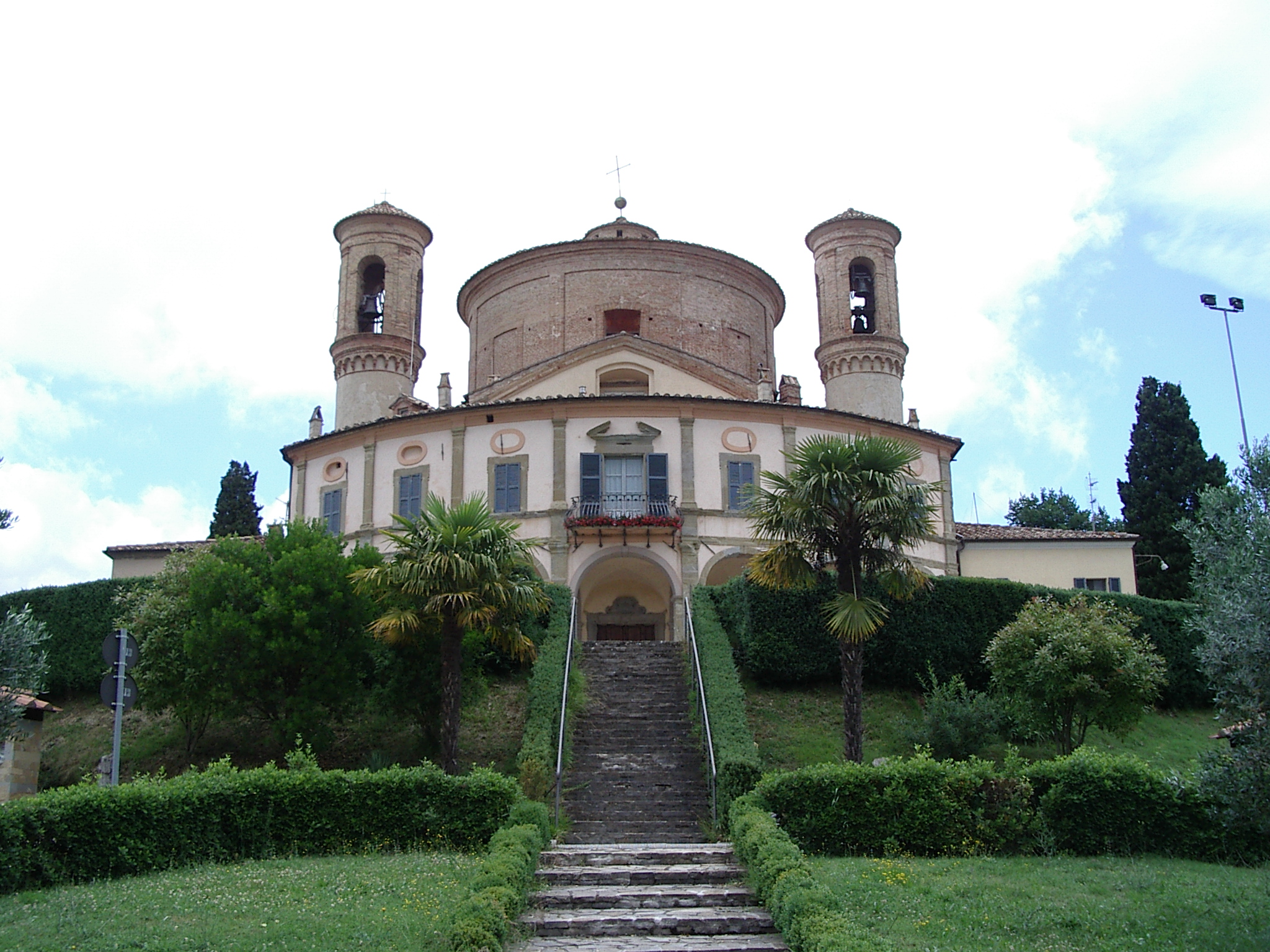
The exterior of the Sanctuary of Belvedere, defined by a domed rotunda

The sanctuary, which houses an ancient image of the Virgin Mary, is located about 5 kilometres (3.1 mi) from Città di Castello. The church stands on the hill of Caprano, now called Belvedere, and was built in Baroque style between 1669 and 1684 to a design by Antonio Gabrielli and Nicola Barbioni.

It has an octagonal plan with four short arms and is covered by a dome. A semicircular portico stands in front of the entrance. Inside, there is a wooden vestibule made in 1883. Among the works preserved in the sanctuary is the Martyrdom of Saint Vincent, painted by Giovanni Ventura Borghesi in 1699, located in the right side chapel dedicated to the saint. The high altar contains the image of the Virgin Mary.

Devotion to the Madonna di Belvedere increased over time, and the sanctuary became a Marian center known in central Italy. In 1703 the image was crowned with authorization from the Vatican Chapter.

=== Oratory of San Crescentino ===
The oratory of San Crescentino is located at Morra, a few kilometers from Città di Castello. It was built in 1420 and enlarged in 1507, and is dedicated to the Roman soldier Crescentinus, martyred in 303 AD under Emperor Diocletian.

The interior consists of a single nave. In the sacristy are late Gothic frescoes related to the original structure, while along the walls are decorations executed by the workshop of Luca Signorelli. The scenes of the Flagellation and the Crucifixion are attributed directly to Signorelli.

=== Abbey of Badia Petroia ===
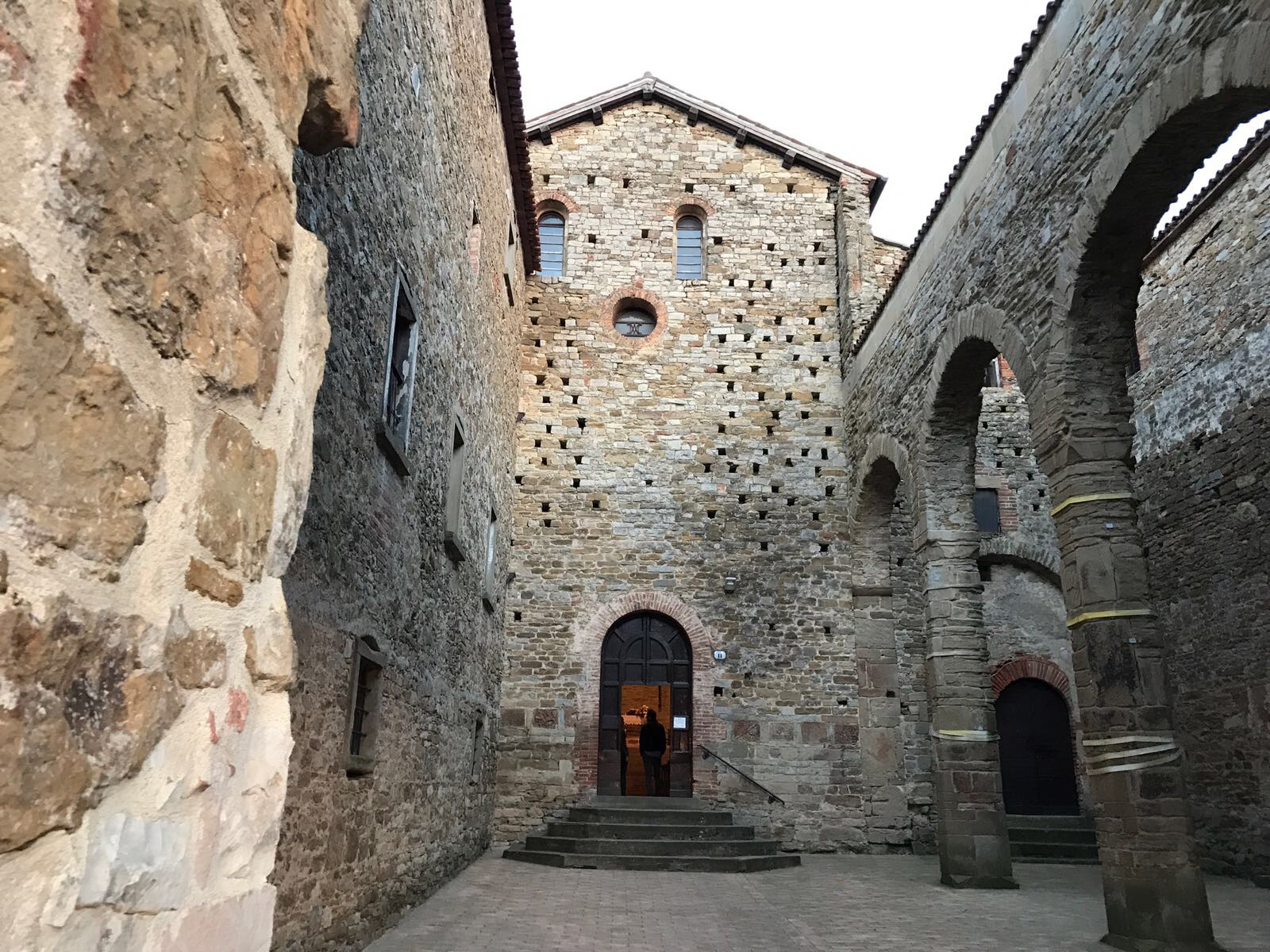
Inner courtyard of the Abbey of Badia Petroia

The Benedictine abbey stands on a hill overlooking the valley of the Nestore stream, about 16 kilometres (9.9 mi) south of Città di Castello. It was founded around 960 by Marquis Ugo del Colle. Its present appearance is the result of major alterations carried out in the 15th and 16th centuries, when the abbots progressively abandoned the complex and moved to the city.

The Romanesque church was reduced by one nave, and the residential buildings were adapted to other uses. Damage from the 1917 earthquake left the central space of the original church without a roof, giving it the appearance of an internal courtyard. The crypt preserves its original tripartite layout and includes reused materials in its structural elements. Terracotta panels dating from the 10th–11th centuries are set into the façade.

=== Hermitage of Buon Riposo ===
The Hermitage of Buon Riposo is located in an isolated area on Monte Citerone. A hermitage already existed there in the time of Saint Francis, consisting of natural caves. The name is linked to words attributed to Saint Francis, who stopped there when traveling to La Verna.

The hermitage hosted several religious figures, including Saint Anthony of Padua, Saint Bonaventure, Saint Bernardino of Siena, and Blessed Francis of Pavia.

=== Other religious buildings ===
The church of San Bartolomeo, located near Palazzo Vitelli at Sant'Egidio, contains a stone tabernacle from the 14th century and a painting of the Martyrdom of Saint Bartholomew by Sguazzino on the high altar.

The church of San Giovanni Decollato was built in the 15th century and later altered by restorations. On the old lateral entrance is a fresco of Saint John the Baptist attributed to Luca Signorelli. Inside are additional works attributed to Signorelli, including a Baptism of Christ and a Madonna and Child bearing a date of 1495.

The sanctuary of Canoscio stands on a wooded hill. A small chapel was established there in 1387 and enlarged in 1406. In the 19th century a new church was constructed and consecrated in 1878. The interior has three naves. The sanctuary contains an earlier shrine and paintings of the Virgin and Apostles by Annibale Gatti.

The church of Santa Maria Maggiore was built at the end of the 15th century to a design by Baccio Pontelli. It is said to be notable for the originality of its construction.

The church of Santa Cecilia contains, to the right of the high altar, a large glazed terracotta lunette depicting the Epiphany, a work of the Della Robbia workshop. The church, belonging to a convent, houses works by Pietro della Francesca and terracotta works by the Della Robbia family.

The church of Sant'Egidio existed from the 13th century and preserves in its façade a doorway and window from the 14th century. It contains a parish cross in embossed silver from the 16th century.

The church of Santa Maria delle Grazie is associated with devotion to the Virgin Mary as protector of the city and contains works by Raffaellino del Colle. The church preserves notable remains of 14th-century architecture.

The church of San Pietro of the Oratorians is richly decorated with gilding.

The church associated with the old hospital features stucco decoration, a marble floor, and a painting by Santi di Tito.

The church of Santa Chiara of the Capuchin nuns contains the body of Saint Veronica Giuliani.

== Culture ==
=== Palazzo Vitelli alla Cannoniera ===
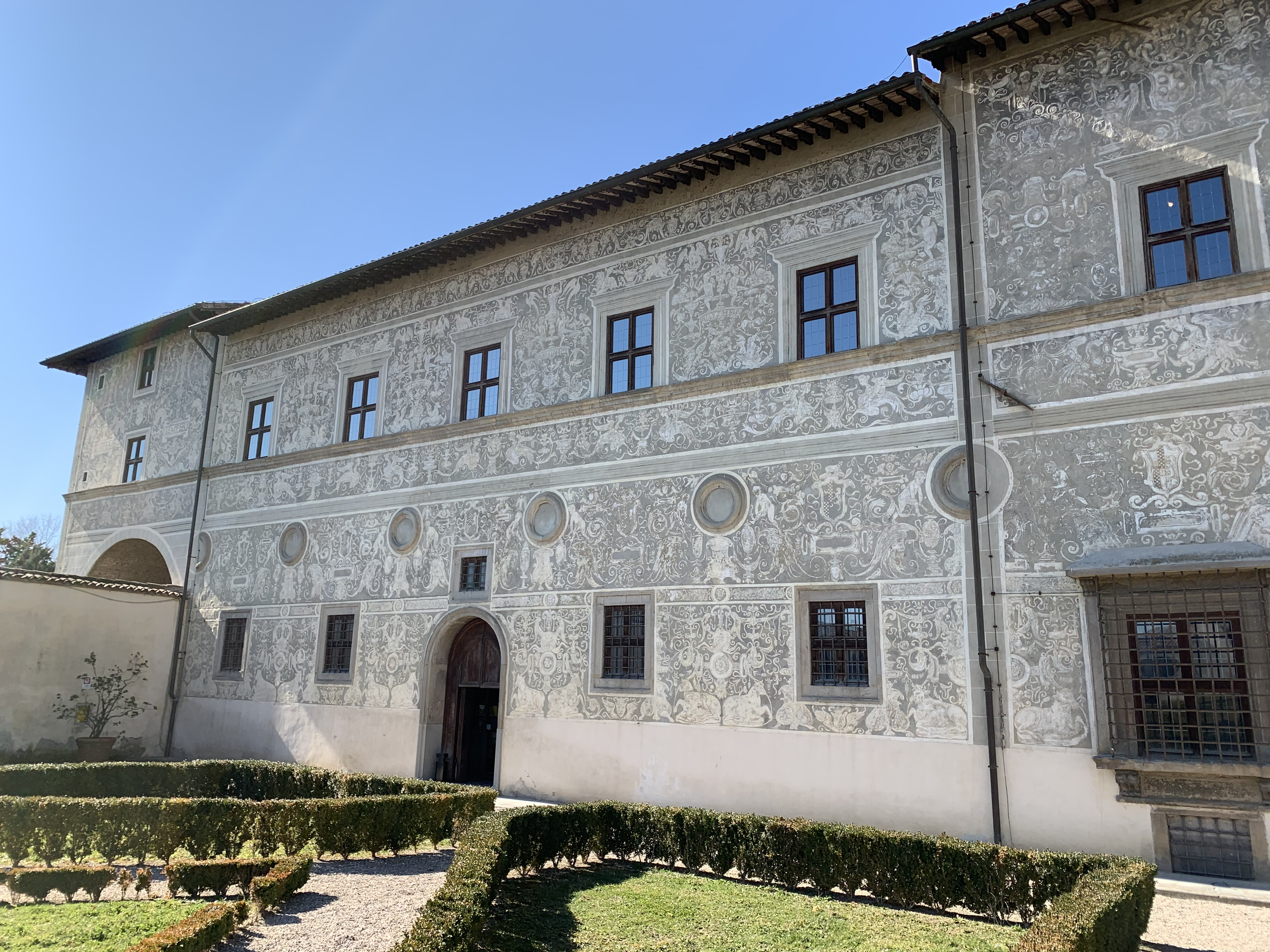
The sgraffito façade of Palazzo Vitelli alla Cannoniera, containing the picture gallery

Palazzo Vitelli alla Cannoniera, one of several palaces built by the Vitelli family in Città di Castello, was commissioned by Alessandro Vitelli. It was constructed in the historic center between 1521 and 1532 by Antonio da Sangallo the Younger and Pier Francesco da Viterbo. The name "Cannoniera" refers to its location near a depot of cannons. The palazzo currently houses the municipal picture gallery.

The main façade is decorated with sgraffito based on a design by Giorgio Vasari. In the 16th century the garden surrounding the palace was known for its collection of exotic plants. In 1912 the last owner donated the building to the city to serve as the seat of the municipal picture gallery.

The interior is decorated with frescoes by Cristofano Gherardi, and Cola dell'Amatrice, beginning from the staircase, which features mythological and allegorical subjects. In the main hall are depictions of the exploits of Hannibal, Scipio, Caesar, and Alexander the Great, commissioned by Alessandro Vitelli.

The gallery is arranged in twenty-six rooms, with additional spaces for temporary exhibitions, and contains works from the 14th to the 20th century. Many works entered public ownership following post-unification confiscations. Artists represented include Raphael, Luca Signorelli, Domenico Ghirlandaio, Andrea della Robbia, Lorenzo Ghiberti, Antonio Vivarini, Raffaellino del Colle, Pomarancio, and Santi di Tito.

Additional sections include the plaster cast collection of Elmo Palazzi, a collection of bronzes by Bruno Bartoccini, and the Ruggieri collection of 20th-century Italian paintings. The museum also preserves historic furnishings, including 16th-century tables, 17th–18th-century seating, and ecclesiastical furniture such as choir stalls, a sacristy cabinet dated 1501, and a carved and gilded sarcophagus associated with Blessed Margaret of Castello.

=== Palazzo dei Priori (Palazzo del Comune) ===
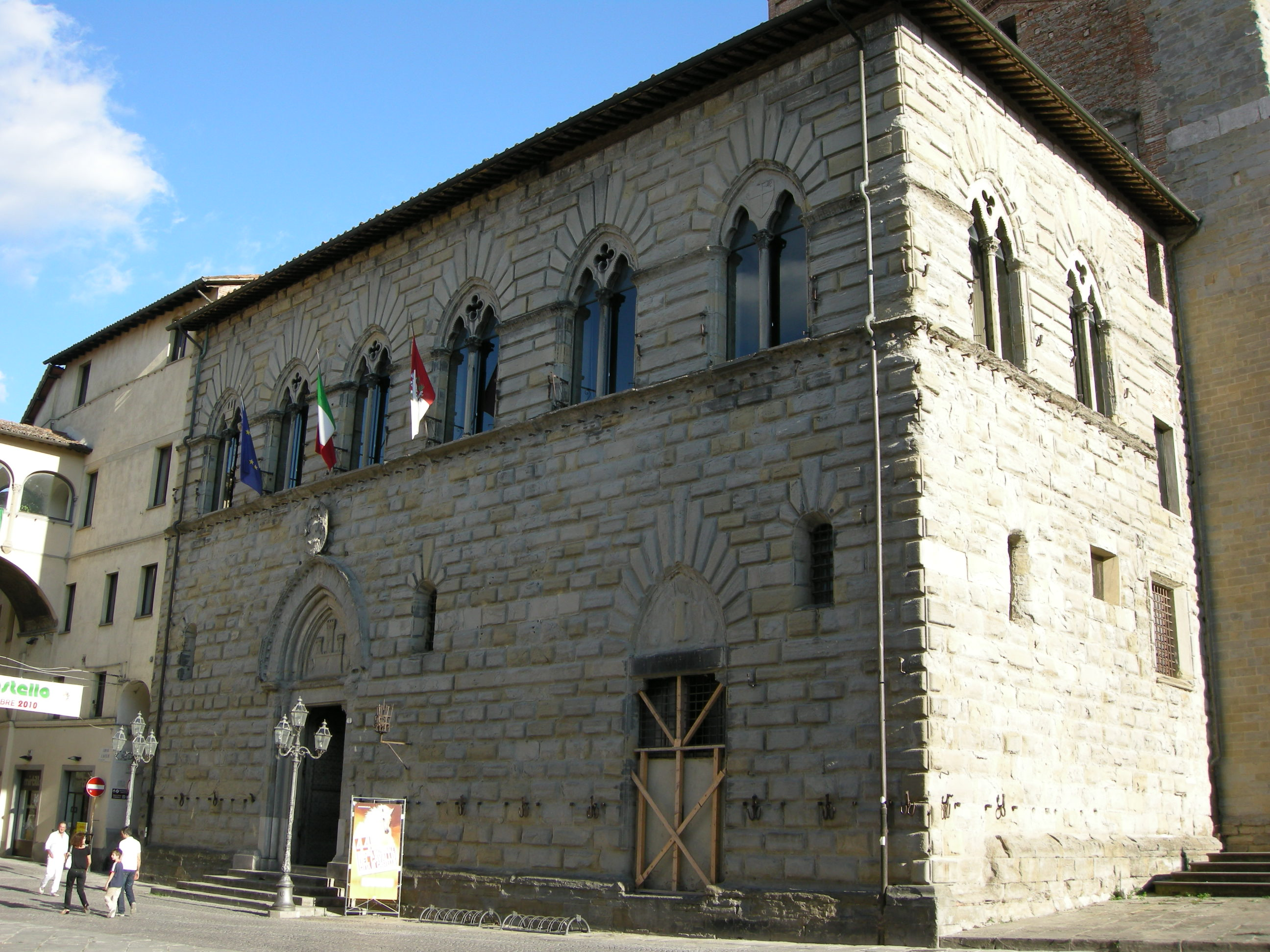
The façade of the Palazzo dei Priori, defined by rusticated stonework and Gothic arched windows

The Palazzo dei Priori, or Palazzo del Comune, is a public building whose construction began in 1322 and was interrupted in 1338 after completion of the first level of biforate windows. The lunette above the main portal bears the coat of arms of the municipality, while an inscription on the architrave recorded the name of the architect, Angelo da Orvieto, who was also engaged in the construction of other public buildings, including the Palazzo del Podestà in the city and the Palazzo dei Consoli in Gubbio.

The exterior decoration includes repeated motifs of the coat of arms of Città di Castello, consisting of a cross and a fortress with three towers. The lunette above the secondary entrance contains a sculpted figure of Justice. The façade is built in rusticated sandstone blocks. Inside, the atrium is supported by two octagonal pillars, from whose capitals extend intersecting ribs and rounded vaulting elements.

A 16th-century staircase leads to the council hall, where fragments of frescoes were uncovered during restoration. The building preserves Roman inscriptions on marble and stone, as well as stamped bricks from the surrounding territory. A statue representing Umbria by the local sculptor Elmo Palazzi is also present. In the adjacent hall are Garibaldian relics and a painting of the Martyrdom of Saint Lawrence by Vincenzo Barboni, dated 1832.

=== Palazzo del Podestà ===
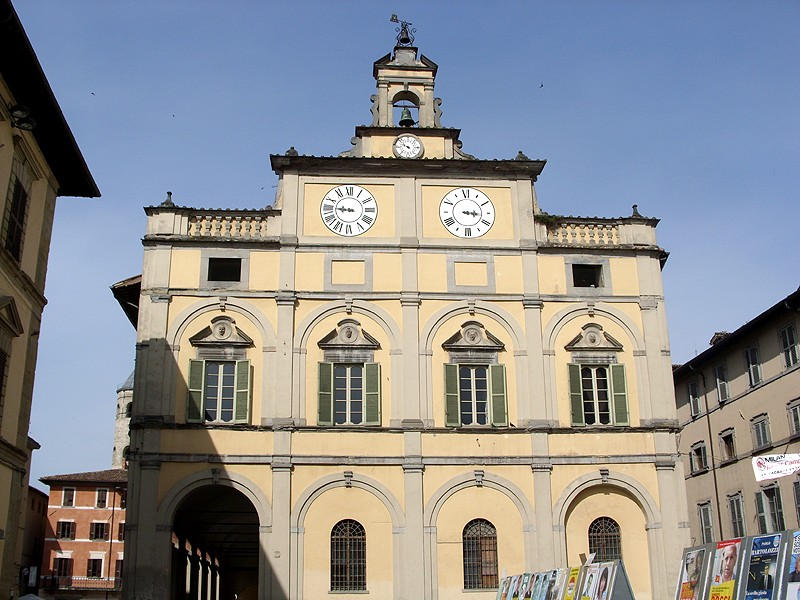
The Palazzo del Podestà, featuring two large dials on the main elevation and a wind dial above in the bell tower

The Palazzo del Podestà was constructed by Angelo da Orvieto a few years after the Palazzo del Comune and was completed in 1368, reportedly on commission from the Tarlati di Pietramala. The building employs courses of dressed pietra serena similar to those used in Gubbio.

On the lunettes above the portals of the former ground-floor shops are traces of friezes and coats of arms of the podestàs who governed the city. Each doorway is surmounted by a small semicircular window. One façade remains intact and features biforate windows with semicircular arches on the main floor. The façade facing Piazza Matteotti was rebuilt in 1687 by Nicola Barbioni, and the loggia toward Piazza Fanti was constructed in 1620. Above the clocks is a dial depicting a wind rose.

=== Palazzo Albizzini ===
Palazzo Albizzini dates to the 15th century and reflects Renaissance architectural forms influenced by Florence. The Albizzini family is documented from the 14th century and played a significant role in the history of the city.

The building houses a museum of contemporary art, open to the public since 1981, containing 130 works by Alberto Burri, created between 1948 and 1989 and arranged by the artist across twenty rooms. The works include painting, sculpture, graphic art, and stage design. The collection traces Burri's artistic development, including works using materials such as tar, sacks, wood, iron, and plastics. Sketches for theatrical scenography are also present, including those for a 1975 production of Tristan und Isolde.

=== Canoscio hoard ===
The Tesoro di Canoscio, preserved in the Museo del Duomo, is a collection of silver objects in repoussé work used for the Eucharistic liturgy and dated to the 6th century AD. It was discovered in 1935 at the Santuario di Canoscio near Città di Castello, found in a heap and covered by a large plate.

The group consists of 25 objects including plates, patens, chalices, a covered pyx, strainers, a small ladle and numerous spoons. The absence of religious symbols on some objects and the presence of utensils not typically liturgical have led to the interpretation that they were originally domestic items later donated to a Christian community and decorated with symbols such as the fish, the cross and the dove. The names Aelianus and Felicitas are inscribed on one of the patens and may indicate the donors.

=== Museo Malacologico Malakos ===
The Museo Malacologico Malakos, located at Villa Cappelletti, houses a collection of approximately 600,000 catalogued shells from seas across the world, including the Pacific Ocean, Indian Ocean, Red Sea, and Mediterranean. The collection was assembled by the biologist Gianluigi Bini, who gathered and studied around 15,000 different species from various regions.

The museum includes sections devoted to biology, introducing mollusks and their characteristics, and to paleontology, illustrating aspects of the formation of the earth and including invertebrates from earlier periods. Displays organized by biogeography present marine environments and the distribution and habits of species, including mangrove areas, deep-sea zones, terrestrial snails of large size, and marine predators. The museum also includes a reconstruction of a coral reef using materials originating from confiscations by the state forestry corps.

=== Other cultural sites ===
The Grifani-Donati printing house, founded in 1799, is located in the historic center above the former church of San Paolo (1237). It functions both as a workshop and as a museum, preserving traditional printing techniques such as typography, lithography, and engraving.

The Tela Umbra workshop is located in Palazzo Alberti Tomassini and continues the production of textiles using traditional manual techniques. Products include linen fabrics made with methods such as spolinato and quadruccio umbro, maintaining artisanal practices established in the early 20th century.

The complex of former tobacco drying facilities was inaugurated as a museum in 1990 and now houses an extensive collection of the Alberto Burri's work, including major pictorial cycles, monumental sculptures displayed both indoors and outdoors.

Palazzo Vecchio Bufalini, associated with Vignola, later housed a gallery and serves as the seat of cultural institutions and a printing establishment.

Palazzo Bufalini, formerly Vitelli, contains an extensive collection of paintings.

Palazzo Mancini houses a gallery including works attributed to Giotto, Signorelli, Guido Reni, Rubens, and others.

Palazzo Vitelli di San Giacomo and Palazzo Vitelli di Sant'Egidio are notable 16th-century residences, the latter richly decorated and associated with the Vitelli family.

Palazzo Pierleoni contains a collection of paintings.

The episcopal palace preserves an archive dating from the 12th century and includes a 13th-century tower.

A monument to Giuseppe Garibaldi was inaugurated on 3 July 1887 in front of the railway station.

The city has theatres, including the Teatro degli Illuminati built in 1650 by Antonio Gabrielli.

=== Other cultural aspects ===
The area is known for products such as truffles, which were already traded in the 15th century, and for the production of Vinosanto Affumicato, made from Trebbiano, Malvasia, and Grechetto grapes using traditional methods of drying and fermentation.

Traditional truffle hunting was historically carried out with pigs and later with trained dogs. A type of dog known as the Grifo Nero Valnerino was developed in the region.

The Parco dei frutti e sapori dimenticati (Archeologia Arborea), located in the surrounding countryside, preserves hundreds of varieties of traditional fruit and agricultural practices.

The art historian Vittorio Sgarbi has referred to the town as the place of the origin of the Renaissance or its capital.

=== Amphitheater ===
The amphitheater is an elliptical structure formed by two parallel walls with a gap between them and an outer facing in vittatum masonry. The structure lacks clear supports for a raised seating area, but it may have used the natural slope of the ground. It resembles so-called provincial amphitheaters, with a sunken arena and seating partly cut into the terrain and partly built up with earth.

The building dates to the 1st century AD based on construction technique and was used for public events. It is the first identified public building of this type at Tifernum Tiberinum.

Inscriptions were found near the entrance to the arena along with a statue base. They are dedicated to Gaius Palius and Gaius Tussidius Marcianus, magistrates of the Clustumina tribe, the main tribe of the inhabitants of Tifernum Tiberinum. The inscriptions likely record public honors. The individuals named may have been involved in the construction of the building.

=== Other archaeological sites ===
Riosecco is the main protohistoric site in the area. The settlement extended over more than one hectare. Excavations revealed large rectangular structures with wooden elevations. The materials recovered date from the late 8th to the 6th century BC.

Remains of ancient Tifernum Tiberinum include a colored mosaic with animal figures, now preserved in the municipal gallery. Outside Porta San Florido, in the area known as the Cascine, are the remains of a large structure in reticulated masonry with traces of mosaic pavements, possibly belonging to public baths.

== Notable people ==
Città di Castello is the birthplace of Saint Floridus, bishop of the 6th century; Pope Celestine II; the physician and scholar Hippolito Salviani; and the painter Francesco Tifernate.

Among the other notable historical figures associated with Città di Castello were Gregory Tifernas, humanist and philologist; and members of the Vitelli family, including Niccolò Vitelli, Vitellozzo Vitelli, Camillo Vitelli, Paolo Vitelli, and Alessandro Vitelli.

Religious figures include Giulio Vitelli; Vitellozzo Vitelli (cardinal); Francesco Vitelli; and Pietro Fiordelli.

Artists and scholars include Antonio Maria Abbatini; Guido Ubaldo Abbatini; Bernardino Gagliardi; Nicola Barbioni; and Filippo Titi.

Modern cultural figures include Alberto Burri, painter and sculptor; Monica Bellucci, actress; Marietta Alboni; and Michele Bravi, singer and television personality.

Sportspeople include Lamberto Giorgis; Adriano Banelli; and Giovanni Perugini.

== Twin towns ==
Majano, Friuli-Venezia Giulia, Italy, is the only official twin comune.
