= San Secondo, Città di Castello =

San Secondo
- Frazione
- Location within Italy
- Coordinates: 43°24′04″N 12°14′12″E
- Country: Italy
- Region: Umbria
- Province: Perugia
- Comune: Città di Castello
- Elevation: 271 m (889 ft)

Population (2001)
  - Total: 980
- Time zone: UTC+1 (CET)
  - Summer (DST): UTC+2 (CEST)
- Postcode: 06012
- Area code: 075

San Secondo (Italian pronunciation: [ˈsan seˈkondo]) is a frazione of the comune of Città di Castello in the Province of Perugia, Umbria, central Italy. It stands at an elevation of 271 metres above sea level. At the time of the Istat census of 2001 it had 980 inhabitants.
