= Cesare De Titta =

Italian poet

A la fónte - La scuncòrdie

Cesare De Titta (Sant'Eusanio del Sangro, 27 January 1862– ibidem, 14 February 1933) was an Italian poet who wrote in Italian, Latin and in Neapolitan Abruzzese.

His mother was Sofia Loreto, and his father, Vincenzo De Titta, was a public notary. Cesare attended the Seminary of Lanciano from the age of sixteen, in order to become a priest, and studied classical languages at the Seminary of Venosa from 1881 to 1889, where he would later be its dean. Among his most important linguistic works are Grammatica della lingua viva and Grammatica della lingua latina.

== Works ==
- Saggi di traduzione da Catulo (1890)
- Canzoni abruzzesi (1919)
- Nuove canzoni abruzzesi (1923)
- Gente d'Abruzzo (1923)
- Terra d'oro (1925)
- Acqua, foco, vento (1925)
