= Crescentinus =

Saint Crescentinus
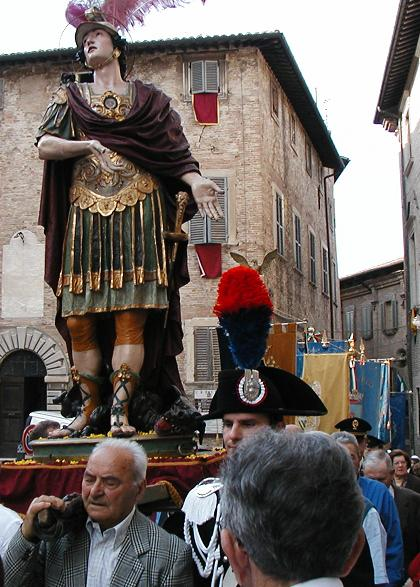
- A statue of Crescentinus borne in procession in the streets of Urbino for his feast day.

Martyr
- Died: ~303 AD
- Venerated in: Roman Catholic Church; Eastern Orthodox Church
- Major shrine: Urbino Cathedral
- Feast: 1 June
- Attributes: Military attire, depicted slaying a dragon
- Patronage: Urbino, Città di Castello, invoked against headache

Saint Crescentinus (Italian: San Crescentino, Crescenziano) (died June 1, 303) is the patron saint of Urbino whose feast day is celebrated on June 1. Venerated as a warrior saint, he is sometimes depicted on horseback, killing a dragon, in the same manner as Saint George. However, as Martin Davies writes, "S. Crescentino’s story, so far as I am aware, excludes a Princess or other female victim."

== Legend ==
Crescentinus is traditionally said to have been a Roman soldier who converted to Christianity. To escape the persecutions of Diocletian, he fled to Umbria, and found refuge at Thifernum Tiberinum (present-day Città di Castello). His defeat of a dragon led to a successful evangelization of the region, together with his companions. His mission was confined particularly to the Tiber Valley and the ancient Thifernum Tiberinum. He was subsequently beheaded.

== Veneration ==
Wishing to enrich his cathedral, Blessed Mainard (Mainardo), the Bishop of Urbino, brought the saint's relics to the city in 1068.

The coin known as the armellino (popularly called the volpetta) issued by the Duke of Urbino, Francesco Maria I della Rovere, featured Saint Crescentinus on horseback.

He is still venerated in Urbino, where his statue is carried through the streets in a procession on his feast day. Another ritual involves tapping devotees’ heads with Crescentinus' relics, to free the supplicant from headaches.

== Gallery ==
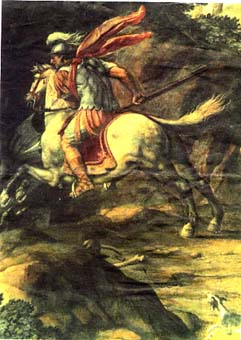
San Crescenziano uccide il drago (Saint Crescentinus kills the dragon), Marco Benefial 1747–49. Cathedral of Città di Castello
