= Giovanni Battista Pacetti =

Italian painter

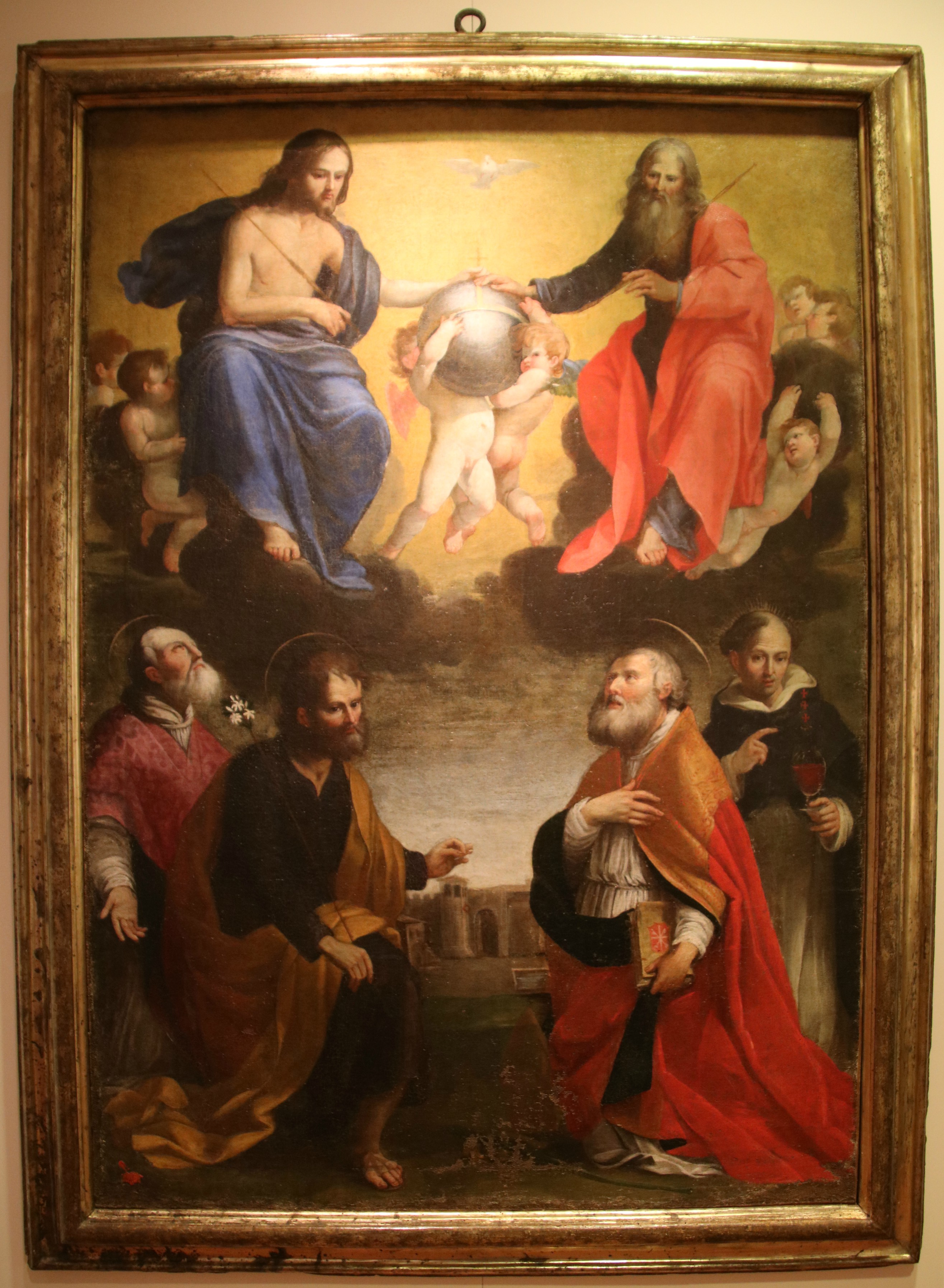
Adoration of the Trinity

Giovanni Battista Pacetti, nicknamed Lo Sguazzino (1593–1630) was an Italian painter of the Baroque period, active in his native Città di Castello. His nickname derives from the splashed on technique. He was prolific in painting altarpieces and religious subjects.

== Biography ==
He studied in Perugia. He painted mainly in the Citta di Castello, where he decorated the Chapel of the Angel Guardian and the adjacent Chapel of St Michael Archangel in the Cathedral. In 1609, the Jesuit order founded a college in Citta di Castello, and a few years later built the church of Gesu.

For the church he painted what was once the main altarpiece with Saint Anthony Abbot, Francis Xavier, and Ignatius Loyola. He also painted five other canvases of Saints for the church. For the parish church of San Bartolommeo, he painted an Apostle and a Madonna del Soccorso, as well as Saints Jerome and Stephen. He painted a Virgin with Saints Donino and Alberto for the first chapel on the left of the church of Phillip Neri. He also painted in the Convent of San Domenico.
