= Berto di Giovanni =

Italian painter

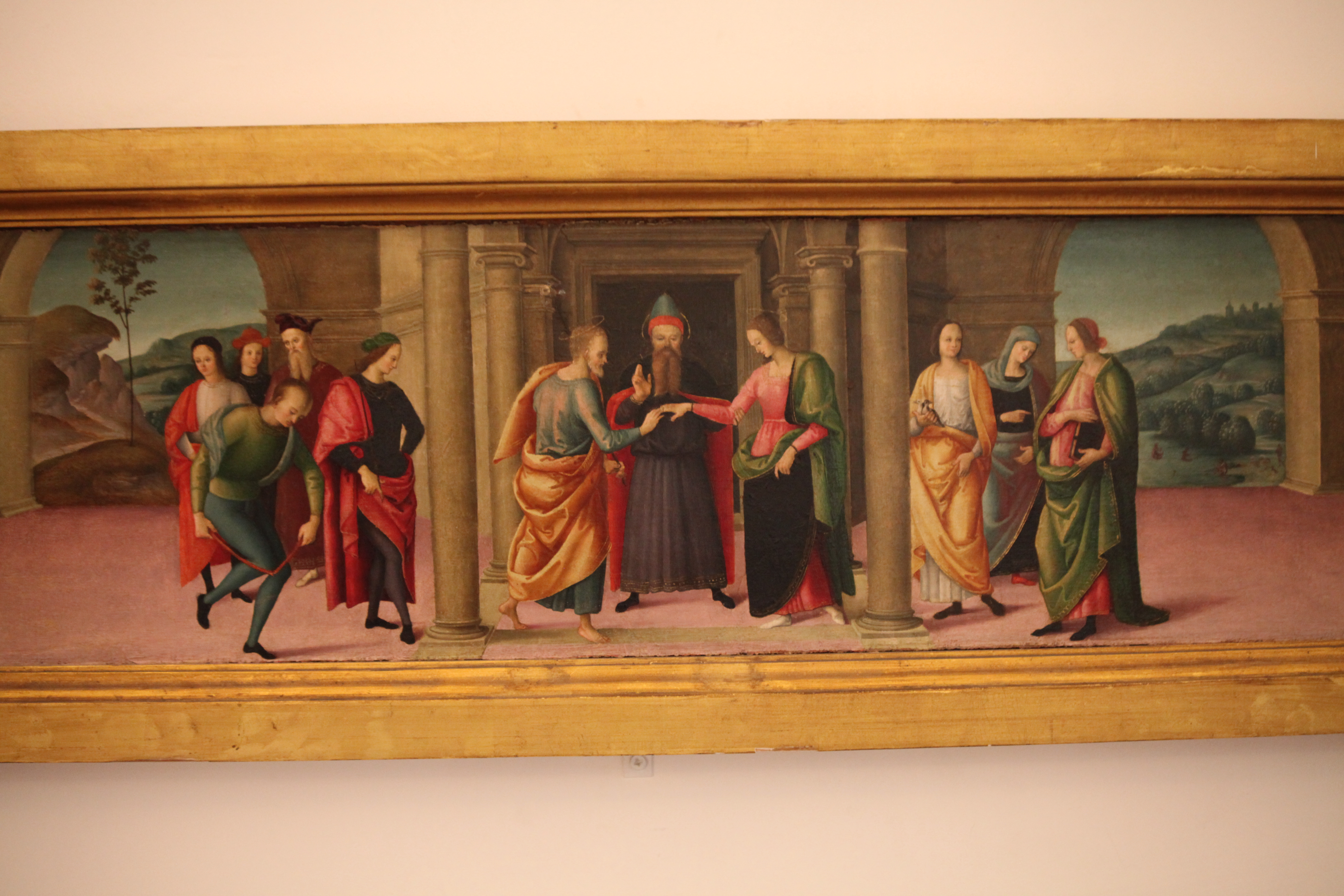
Marriage of the Virgin

Berto di Giovanni (di Marco), a pupil of Perugino, painted at Perugia from 1497 to 1525. He executed works for the magistrates, and was a member of the guild of that city. He painted with a predella, in the convent of Santa Maria di Monteluce at Perugia, the following subjects from the Life of Christ: 'The Nativity,' 'The Presentation,' and 'The Marriage' and 'Death of the Virgin.' These form part of a large work of the 'Coronation of the Virgin,' which Raphael was originally commissioned to paint, but which was subsequently executed by an artist whose name has not been recorded.

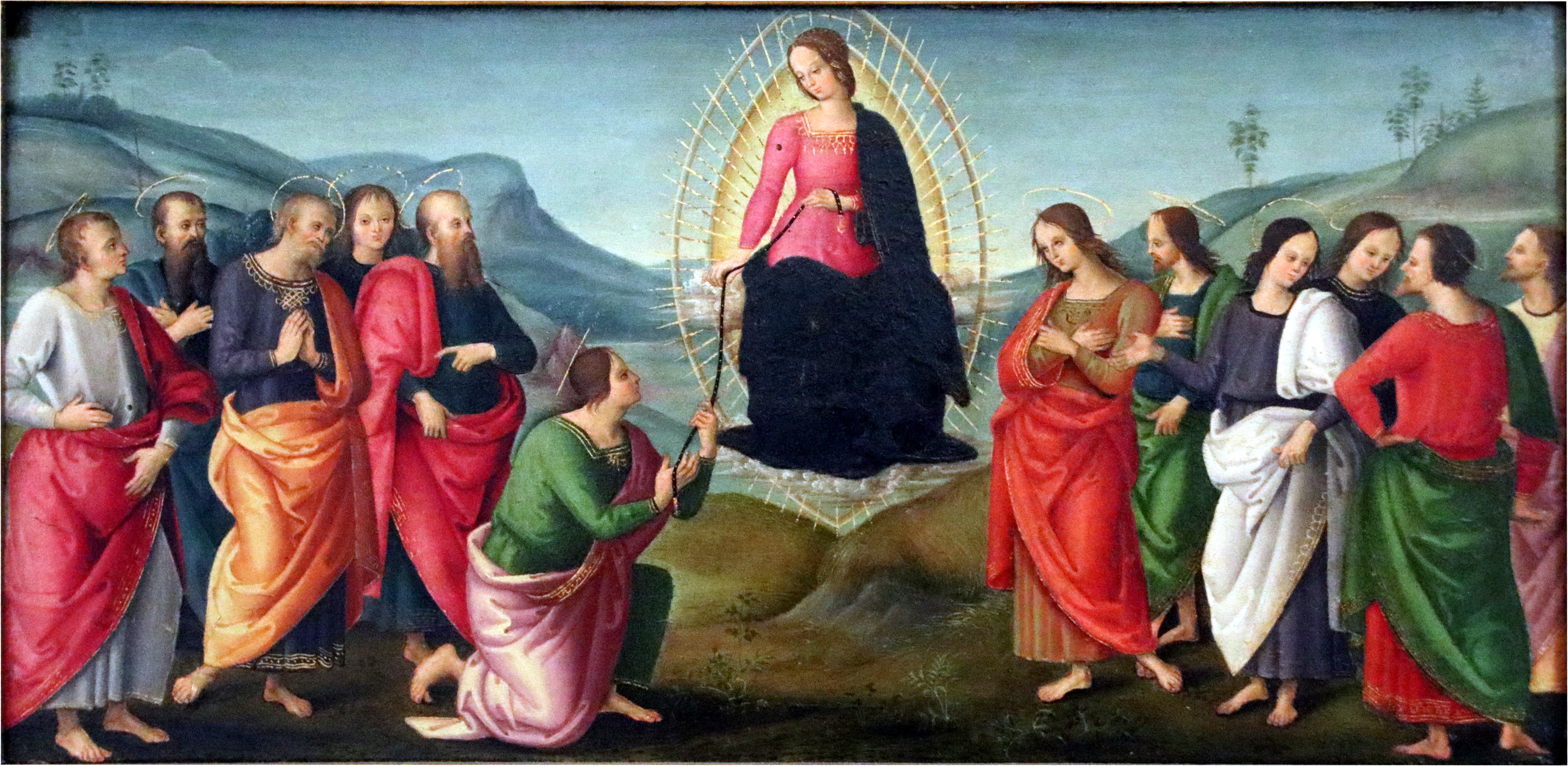
Virgin of the Assumption giving her belt to St. Thomas

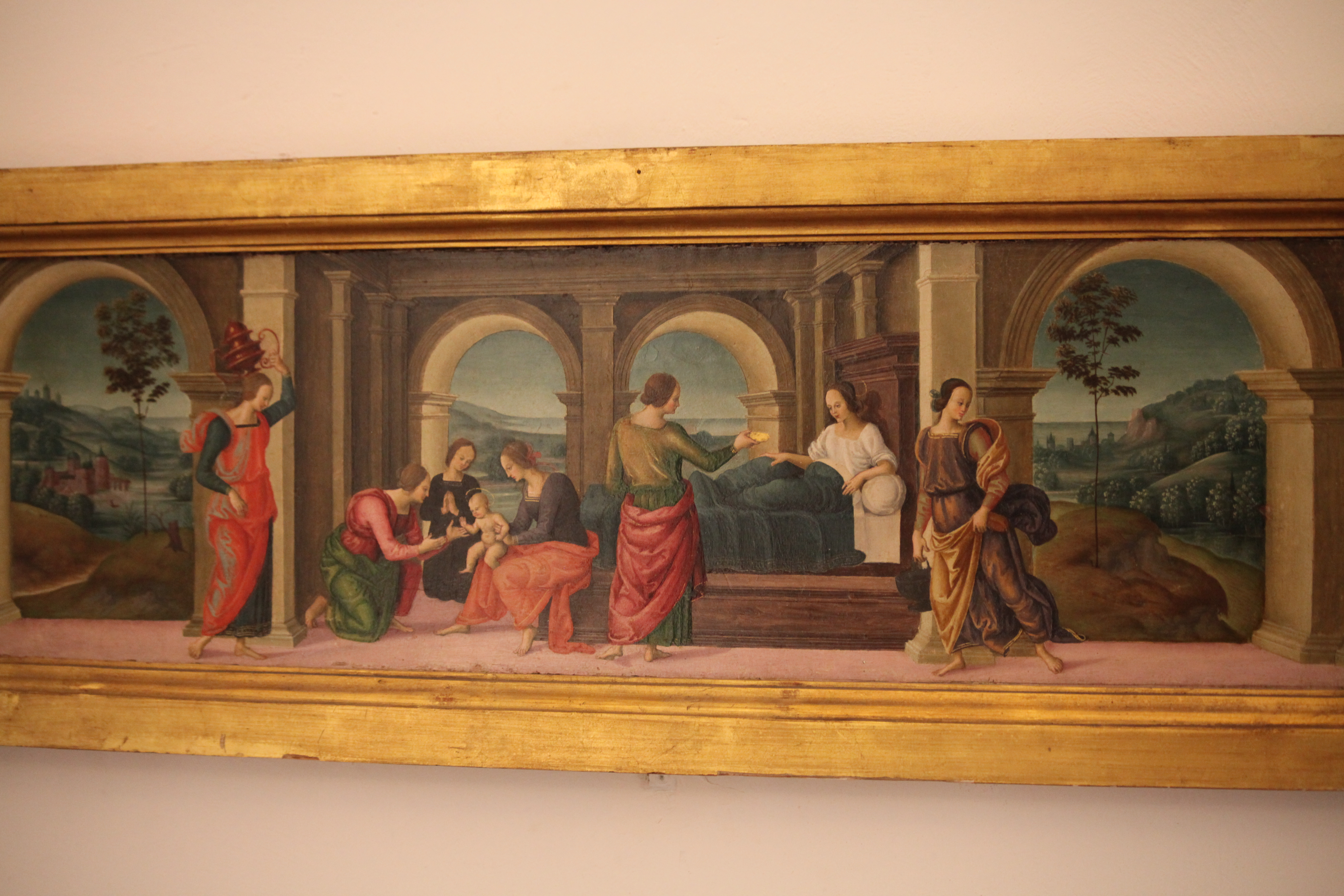
Nativity of the Virgin
