= Castles of the Duchy =

Consortium of Italian castle sites

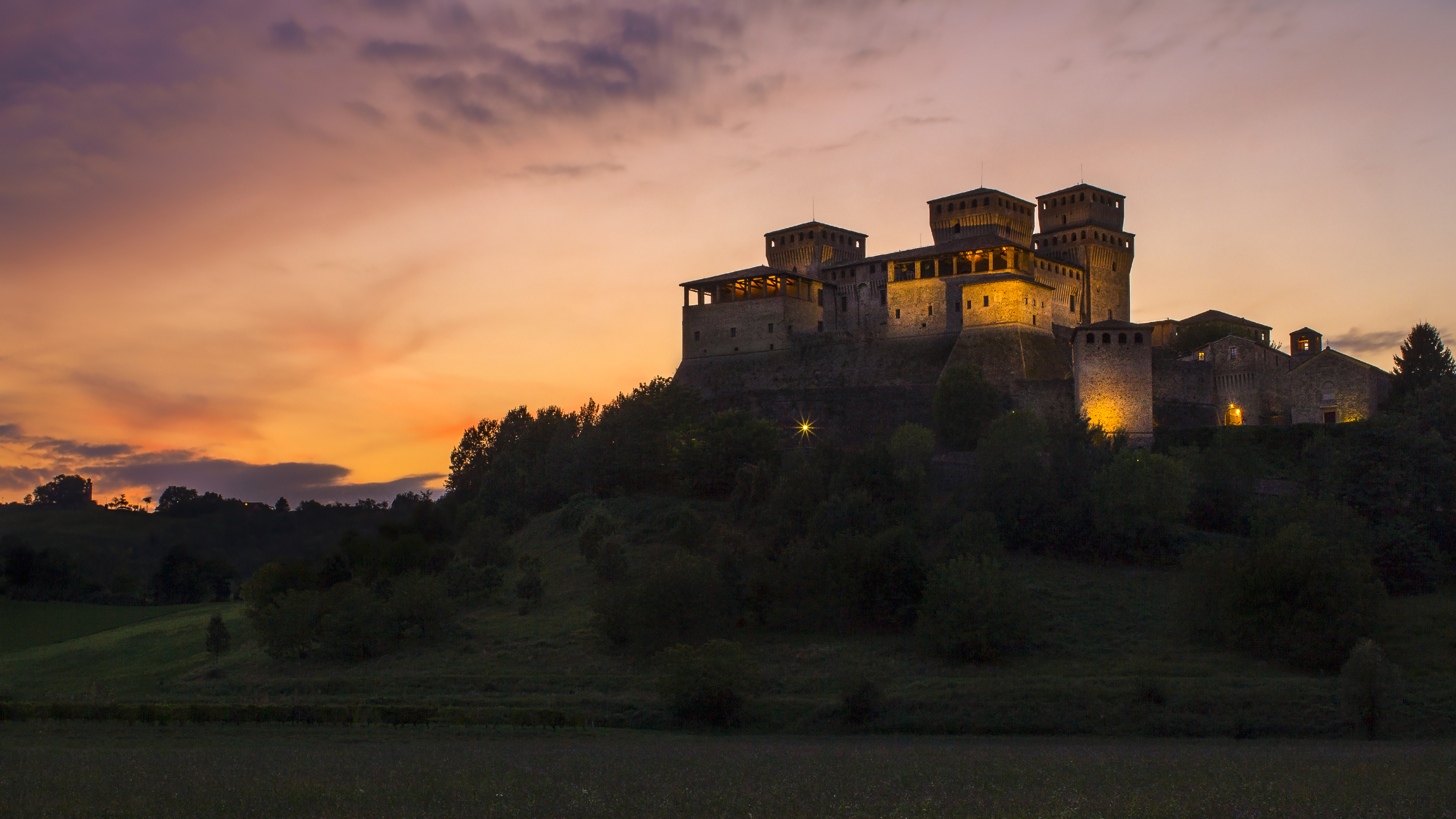
Castello di Torrechiara

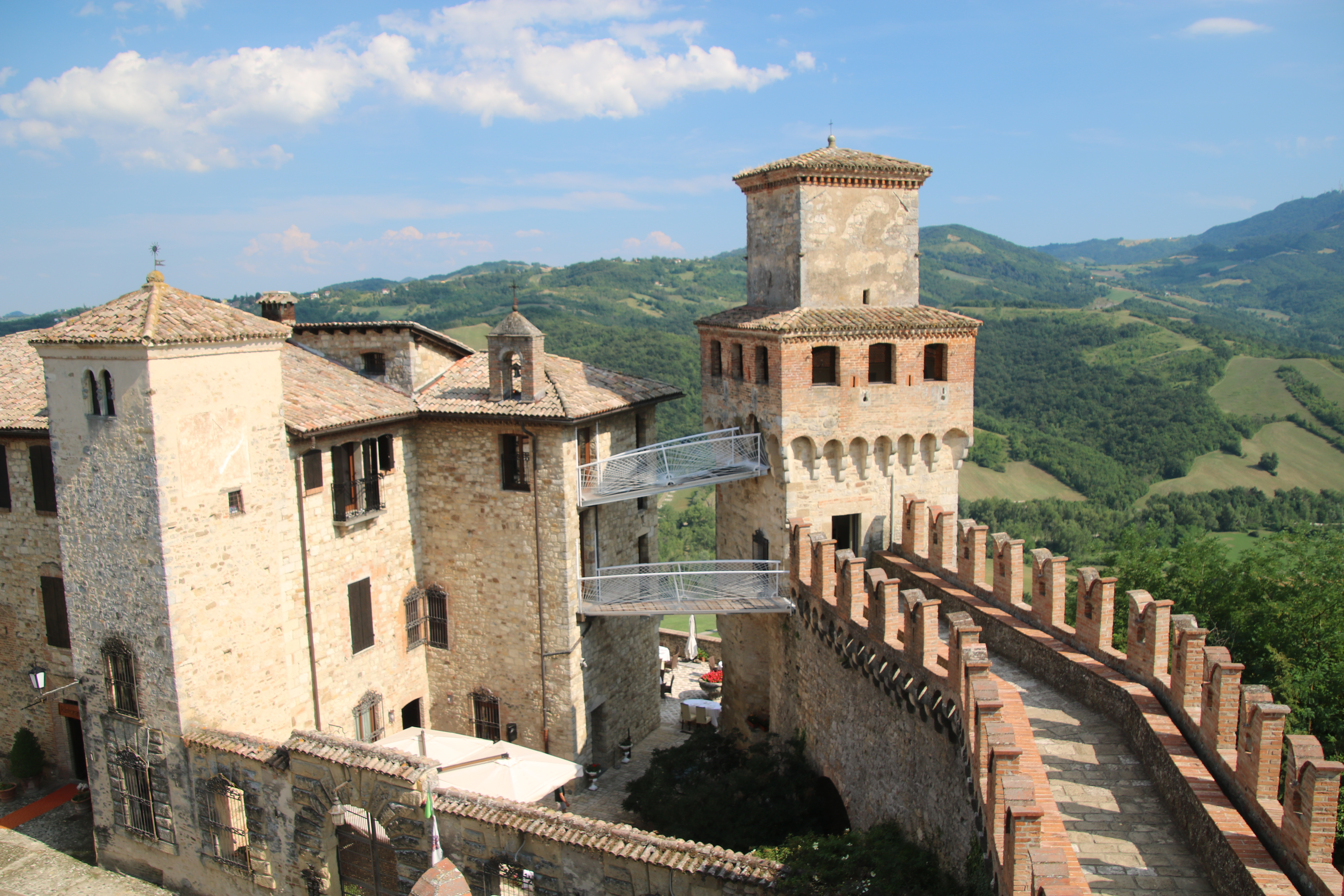
Castello di Vigoleno

The Associazione dei Castelli del Ducato di Parma, Piacenza e Pontremoli, also known as Castelli del Ducato, is a consortium that brings together numerous castles and historical sites in the provinces of Parma, Piacenza, Massa-Carrara, Reggio Emilia, and Cremona.

== History ==
The Associazione dei Castelli del Ducato di Parma e Piacenza was established on 27 May 1999. At its inception, the association, which enjoyed the patronage of the provinces of Parma and Piacenza, included 14 founding castles, along with some supporting members. Some of the castles joining the new association came from the Castelli della Bassa Parmense circuit, established in 1996, and the Associazione dei Castelli Aperti di Piacenza, founded in 1998.

Since the association’s establishment, the number of associated castles and annual visitors has grown steadily: in 2000, annual admissions were around 300,000, rising to over 500,000 in 2003; regarding the number of members, in 2004, there were 19 associated castles (11 in the province of Parma and 8 in the province of Piacenza).

Starting from 1 January 2018, following an agreement formalized in November 2017, the municipality of Pontremoli, home to the Castello del Piagnaro, located in the province of Massa-Carrara but bordering the province of Parma, joined the circuit, which consequently changed its name to Associazione dei Castelli del Ducato di Parma, Piacenza e Pontremoli.

Between 2019 and 2022, several castles and palaces in the province of Reggio Emilia joined the association, including the Rocca dei Boiardo in Scandiano, the Torre di Rossenella in Canossa, the Ducal Palace in Guastalla, and the historic village and rocchetta of Castellarano.

In November 2019, Villa Medici del Vascello, a noble building located in the municipality of San Giovanni in Croce in the province of Cremona, joined the association, becoming the first Cremonese structure to be part of the circuit. In January 2022, the second Cremonese member joined the association, the municipality of Casalmaggiore, with its Bijou Museum.

In 2019, before the COVID-19 pandemic in Italy, the annual number of visitors to the castles in the circuit was approximately 600,000.

== About ==
The association, headquartered at the Rocca Sanvitale in Fontanellato, in the province of Parma, is a thematic product club recognized by the Emilia-Romagna region, comprising legal and physical persons who own, or have the right to manage, a castle within the association’s territory that is open to the public, in good condition, and of significant artistic and historical value. Alongside ordinary members, there are supporting members who, while sharing the association’s goals, do not meet the requirements to be ordinary members; they do not have voting rights or the ability to hold office and may include public entities, restaurants, and accommodation facilities.

The circuit aims to achieve two objectives: the promotion and enhancement of the territory, its historical events, art, and gastronomy, and the provision of technical, administrative, and bureaucratic assistance to members to improve the quality of services offered to the public. Additionally, the circuit works to create synergies in promoting the various associated castles and the territory, to increase the average stay of tourist flows by offering proposals involving the entire circuit rather than individual buildings, and to destagger tourist flows by integrating castles with other forms of tourism such as gastronomy, cycling, art cities, and wellness.

== Castles ==
=== Castles of Parma ===
Castle	Location	Image
Antica Corte Pallavicina di Polesine Parmense	Polesine Parmense	
Castello di Compiano	Compiano	
Castello di Montechiarugolo	Montechiarugolo	
Castello di Roccabianca	Roccabianca	
Castello di Scipione	Salsomaggiore Terme	
Tabiano Castle	Salsomaggiore Terme	
Castello di Torrechiara	Torrechiara	
Castello di Varano de' Melegari	Varano de' Melegari	
Castello di Bardi	Bardi	
Reggia di Colorno	Colorno	
Rocca dei Rossi	San Secondo Parmense	
Rocca Sanvitale	Sala Baganza	
Rocca Meli Lupi	Soragna	
Rocca Sanvitale	Fontanellato	

=== Castles of Piacenza ===
Castle	Location	Image
Agazzano Castle	Agazzano	
Castello di Gropparello	Gropparello	
Castello di Paderna	Pontenure	
Castello di Rivalta	Gazzola	
Castello di San Pietro in Cerro	San Pietro in Cerro	
Castello Malaspina dal Verme di Bobbio	Bobbio	
Castello di Vigoleno	Vigoleno	
Palazzo Farnese and Cittadella Viscontea di Piacenza	Piacenza	
Rocca d'Olgisio	Pianello Val Tidone	
Visconti Rocca	Castell'Arquato	

=== Castles of Massa Carrara ===
Castle	Location	Image
Castello del Piagnaro	Pontremoli	

=== Other locations ===
Location		Location	Image
Fontevivo Abbey		Fontevivo	
Apotheosis of Galeotti		Sala Baganza	
Camera di San Paolo and Correggio		Parma	
Castell'Arquato		Castell'Arquato	
Castello di Castelnuovo Fogliani		Castelnuovo Fogliani	
Castello di Contignaco		Salsomaggiore Terme	
Rocca dei Sanvitale (Noceto)		Noceto	
Castello di Riva		Ponte dell'Olio	
Compiano		Compiano	
Corniglio		Corniglio	
Dallara Academy		Varano de' Melegari	
Fontanellato		Fontanellato	
Guastalla		Guastalla	
Giuseppe Verdi sites	Birthplace of Giuseppe Verdi	Roncole Verdi	
Giuseppe Verdi sites	Church of San Michele Arcangelo	Roncole Verdi	
Giuseppe Verdi sites	Rocca Pallavicino	Busseto	
Giuseppe Verdi sites	Collegiata di San Bartolomeo Apostolo	Busseto	
Giuseppe Verdi sites	Oratory of the Santissima Trinità	Busseto	
Giuseppe Verdi sites	Palazzo del Monte di Pietà (Busseto)	Busseto	
Giuseppe Verdi sites	Santa Maria degli Angeli	Busseto	
Giuseppe Verdi sites	Casa Barezzi	Busseto	
Giuseppe Verdi sites	Palazzo Orlandi	Busseto	
Labirinto della Masone by Franco Maria Ricci in Fontanellato		Fontanellato	
Monchio delle Corti		Monchio delle Corti	
Montechiarugolo	Church of San Quintino	Montechiarugolo	
Montechiarugolo	Civic Palace	Montechiarugolo	
Montechiarugolo	Sanctuary of Santa Maria Ausiliatrice	Montechiarugolo	
Montechiarugolo	Church of Santo Stefano (Montechiarugolo)	Basilicagoiano	
Montechiarugolo	Church of San Donnino	Monticelli Terme	
Montechiarugolo	Oratorio del Romito	Montechiarugolo	
Museo Agorà Orsi Coppini		San Secondo Parmense	
Museo costantiniano della Steccata		Parma	
Jewish Museum Fausto Levi		Soragna	
Palazzo Marchi		Parma	
Polesine Zibello	Museum "Il cinematografo"	Zibello	
Polesine Zibello	Teatro Pallavicino	Zibello	
Polesine Zibello	Museum of Peasant Civilization "Giuseppe Riccardi"	Zibello	
Ponte dell'Olio		Ponte dell'Olio	
Rocca dei Terzi		Sissa	
Rocca di Valle di Castrignano		Valle di Castrignano	
Roccabianca		Roccabianca	
Salsomaggiore Terme		Salsomaggiore Terme	
Soragna		Soragna	
On the Via Francigena along the history of Borgo San Donnino	Fidenza Cathedral	Fidenza	

=== Reggio Emilia ===
Castle	Location	Image
Borgo and Rocchetta of Castellarano	Castellarano	
Castello di Bianello	Quattro Castella	
Correggio	Correggio	
Ducal Palace of Guastalla	Guastalla	

=== Cremona ===
Location		Location	Image
Casalmaggiore		Casalmaggiore	
Historic Cremonese residences	Palazzo Calciati Crotti	Cremona	
Historic Cremonese residences	Palazzo Cattaneo Ala Imperiali	Cremona	
Historic Cremonese residences	Villa Calciati Crotti	Persico Dosimo	
Historic Cremonese residences	Castello Mina della Scala	Casteldidone	
Historic Cremonese residences	Villa Sommi Picenardi	Torre de' Picenardi	
Historic Cremonese residences	Villa Bottini La Limonaia	Monasterolo di Robecco d'Oglio	
Historic Cremonese residences	Villa Manna Roncadelli Vaghi	Grumone di Corte de' Frati	
Historic Cremonese residences	Palazzo Zurla De Poli	Crema	
Historic Cremonese residences	Palazzo Terni de' Gregorj	Crema	

=== Mantova ===
Castle	Location	Image
Sabbioneta UNESCO World Heritage city	Sabbioneta	

== See also ==
- Province of Parma
- Province of Piacenza
- Duchy of Parma and Piacenza

== Bibliography ==
- Il ducato di Parma, Piacenza e Guastalla [The Duchy of Parma, Piacenza, and Guastalla] (in Italian). Piacenza: Itinerari, servizio stampa editore. 2000.
- Carmen Artocchini (1967). Castelli piacentini [Piacenza Castles] (in Italian). Piacenza: Edizioni TEP.
- Andrea Corna (1913). Castelli e rocche del Piacentino [Castles and Fortresses of the Piacenza Area] (in Italian). Piacenza: Unione Tip. Piacentina.
- Daniela Guerrieri (2006). Castelli del Ducato di Parma e Piacenza [Castles of the Duchy of Parma and Piacenza] (in Italian). NLF.
- Alessandra Mordacci (2009). Castelli del Parmense [Castles of the Parma Area] (in Italian). Parma: Gazzetta di Parma.
