= De Rossi =

De Rossi (Italian pronunciation: [de ˈrossi]) is an Italian surname and may refer to:

== Academics ==
- Azariah dei Rossi, an Italian-Jewish physician and scholar
- Bernardo de Rossi, (1687–1775), Italian theologian and historian
- Elena De Rossi Filibeck (20th century), Italian writer on Tibetan subjects
- Giovanni Battista de Rossi (archaeologist), 19th-century Italian archaeologist
- Giovanni Bernardo De Rossi, 19th-century Italian Christian Hebraist
- Michele Stefano de Rossi (1834-1898), Italian seismologist
- Roberto de' Rossi, early humanist in Florence, a follower of Coluccio Salutati and, as the first pupil of Manuel Chrysoloras

== Actresses ==
- Alessandra De Rossi (born 1984), Philippine actress
- Assunta De Rossi (born 1983), Philippine actress
- Barbara De Rossi (born 1960), Italian actress
- Portia de Rossi (born 1973), Australian actress

== Architects ==
- Giovanni Antonio de' Rossi (1616–1695), Italian architect of the Baroque
- Mattia de Rossi (1637–1695), Italian architect of the Baroque period

== Artists ==
- Angelo de Rossi (1671-1715), Italian sculptor
- Bernardino de Rossi (15th century), Italian artist at the court of Lodovico Sforza
- Domenico de' Rossi (1659-1730), Italian sculptor and engraver
- Francesco de' Rossi (1510-1563), Italian Mannerist painter
- Giannetto De Rossi (1942–2021), Italian make-up artist
- Giovanni Giacomo de Rossi (1627-1691), Italian engraver and printer, active in Rome
- Pasquale de' Rossi (1641–1722), Italian painter
- Properzia de' Rossi (1490-1530), Italian Renaissance sculptor

== Clergy ==
- Andrea de Rossi (archbishop) (1644-1696), Italian Roman Catholic Archbishop of Rossano
- Bernardo de' Rossi (1468-1527), Italian bishop and patron of the arts
- Biagio Proto de Rossi (1548-1646), Roman Catholic Archbishop of Messina
- Giovanni de Rossi (bishop) (died 1667), Roman Catholic Bishop of Ossero and Bishop of Chiron
- Giovanni Battista de' Rossi (priest) (1698-1764), Italian Roman Catholic priest
- Giovanni Girolamo de' Rossi (16th century), Italian Roman Catholic Bishop of Pavia
- Giuseppe de Rossi (archbishop of Acerenza e Matera) (died 1610), Roman Catholic Archbishop of Acerenza e Matera, and Bishop of L'Aquila
- Giuseppe de Rossi (bishop of Umbriatico) O.F.M. Conv. (1610–1659), Roman Catholic prelate who served as Bishop of Umbriatico
- Ippolito de' Rossi (1531-1591), Italian Roman Catholic cardinal
- Luigi de' Rossi (1474-1519), Italian Roman Catholic cardinal
- Thomas de Rossi O.F.M. (14th century), Scottish Franciscan friar, papal penitentiary, bishop and theologian

== Composers ==
- Camilla de Rossi (fl. 1670–1710), Italian composer
- Fabrizio De Rossi Re (born 1960), Italian composer and librettist
- Giuseppe de Rossi (composer) (born mid 17th-century - died c. 1719-1720), Italian composer and choir conductor
- Luigi de Rossi (c. 1597-1653), Italian Baroque composer

== Nobility ==
- Angela de' Rossi (1506-1573), Italian noblewoman
- Giovanni de' Rossi (1431-1502), Italian condottiero and the fifth count of San Secondo
- Guido de' Rossi (1440-1490), Italian condottiero
- Pier Maria II de' Rossi (1413-1482), Italian condottiero and count of San Secondo
- Pier Maria III de' Rossi (1504-1547), Italian general and nobleman

== Sportspeople ==
- Alberto De Rossi (born 1957), Italian former footballer and Roma Primavera coach
- Andrea de Rossi (born 1972), Italian former rugby union footballer and a current coach
- Daniele De Rossi (born 1983), Italian former footballer
- Mino De Rossi (1931–2022), Italian road bicycle and track cyclist

== See also ==
- Rossi (surname)
- Ríos (disambiguation)
