= Rocca Sanvitale, Sala Baganza =

Medieval fortress in Sala Baganza, Parma

Coordinates: 44.7128°N 10.2273°E

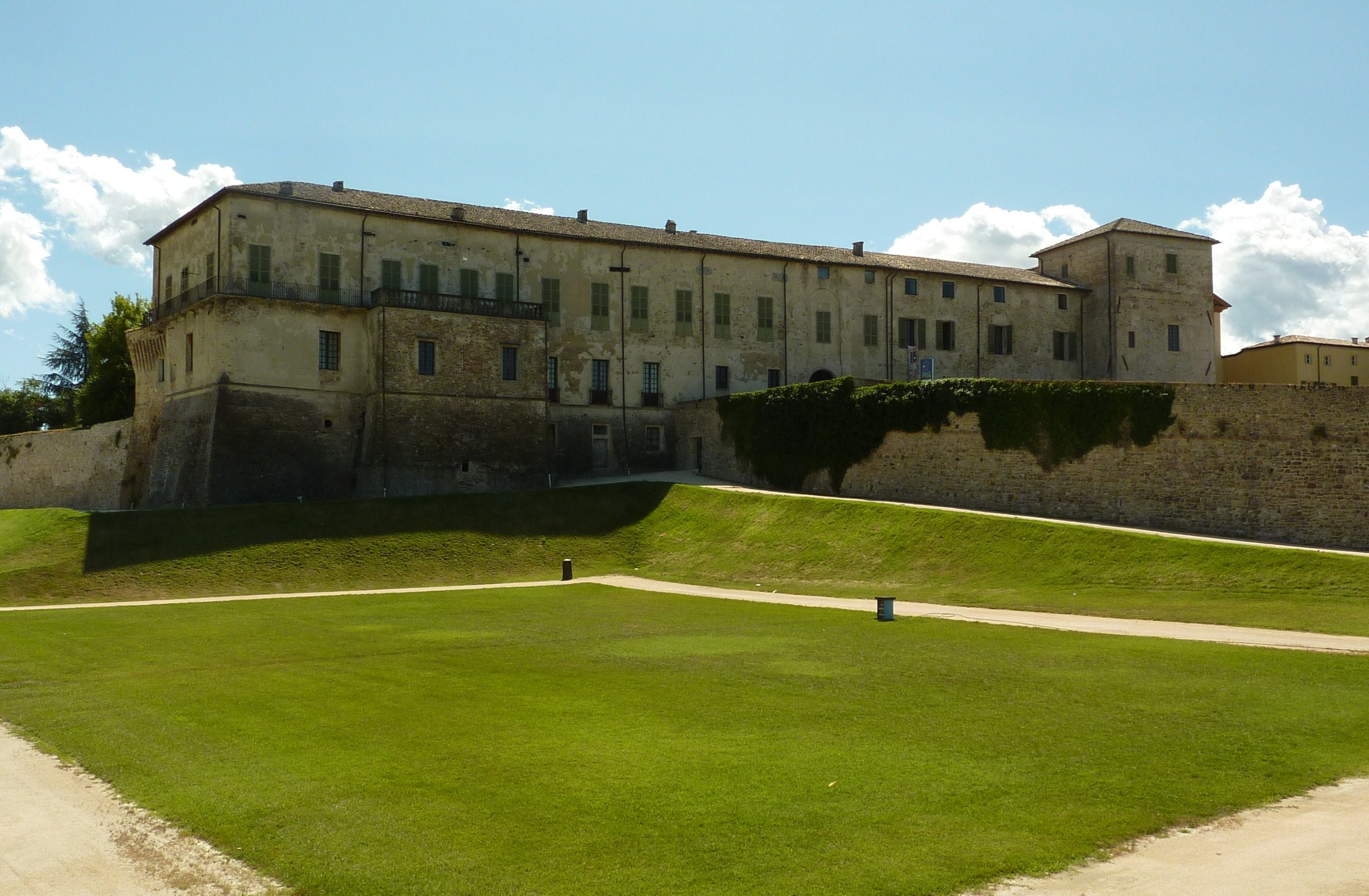
View of the palace/castle

The Rocca Sanvitale or Sanvitale Castle of Sala Baganza is a fortress/palatial residence located on Piazza Gramsci #1, overlooking the small town of Sala Baganza, just southwest of Parma, region of Emilia-Romagna, Italy. It is distinct from the more-visited moated castle of Rocca Sanvitale, Fontanellato.

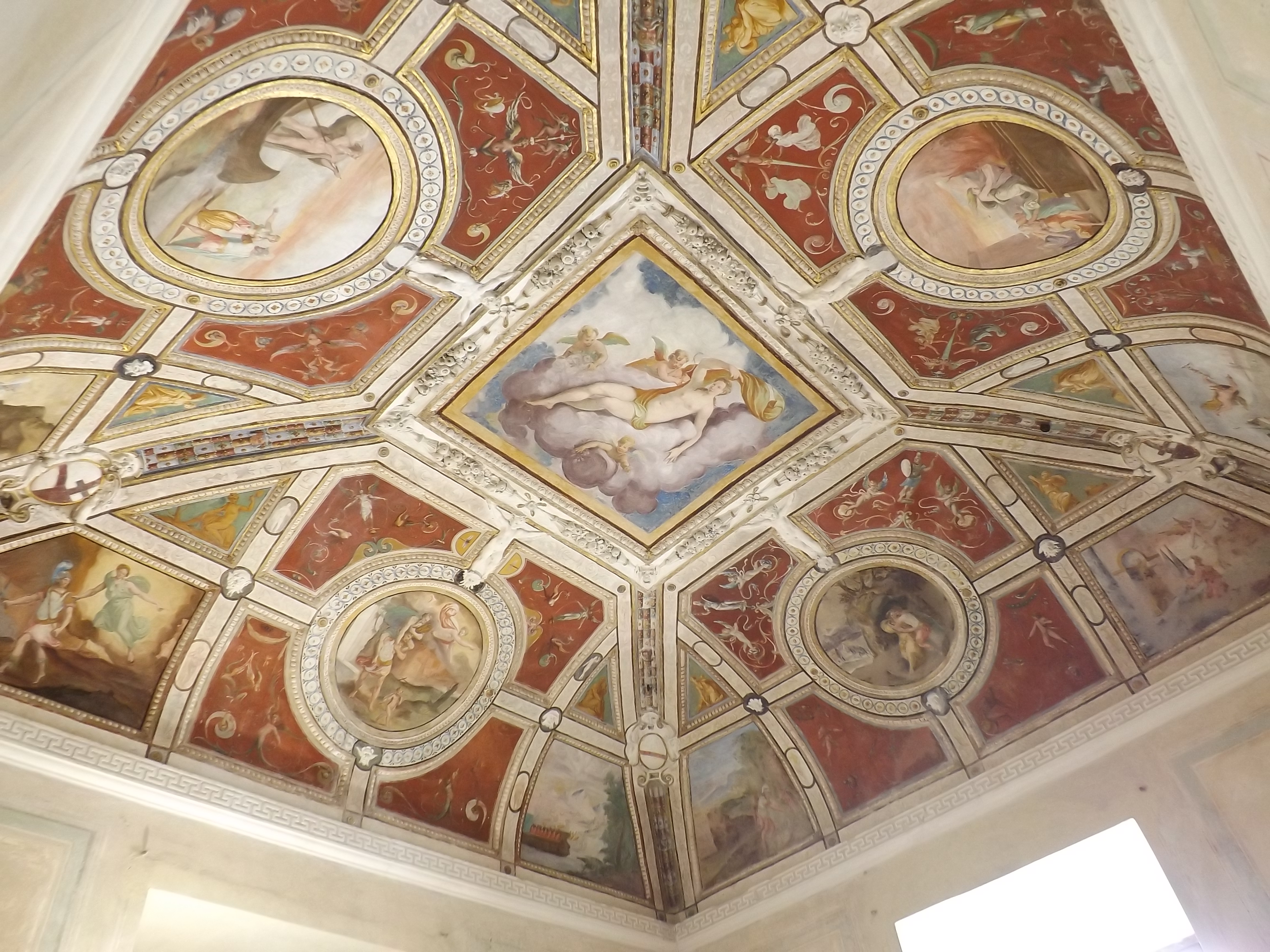
Frescoed ceiling of the Hall of the Aenid

The structure was initially a walled fortress built in 1477 by Gilberto III Sanvitale. Originally the fortress had a walled internal courtyard with surrounding wings and towers, of which only a single one remains. In 1612 a putative conspiracy to depose Ranuccio I Farnese led to the execution of major feudal lords of the duchy, including the countess of Colorno, Barbara Sanseverino, and her son Girolamo Sanvitale, the Farnese confiscated the properties of the Sanvitale family. They proceeded to refurbish his property, commissioning frescoes from Orazio Samacchini, Bernardino Campi and Cesare Baglione. Adjacent and to the north of the palace is the Assunta oratory, commissioned by Ferdinand I of Parma in 1795. A villa surrounded by forests, located about a mile northwest was the Casino dei Boschi, often used in the first half of the 19th century by Marie Louise, Duchess of Parma.

To the south of the Rocca is a walled and geometrically traced grid of paths around a circular pool. This garden was putatively designed by Ennemond Alexandre Petitot, the architect for Phillip, Duke of Parma. Petitot designed this as an orchard with fruit trees. In 2009, an attempt to restore its original structure was performed, funded by the Comune of Sala Baganza, by replanting similar fruit trees to those which would have been present in the ducal orchard. The site now also houses a museum of local wine production.

== See also ==
- Castles of the Duchy
