= Giovanni de' Rossi =

Italian captain in 15th century

- Born: 21 November 1431; San Secondo Parmense
- Died: c. 1502 (aged 71); San Secondo Parmense
- Military career
- Allegiance: Kingdom of France; Republic of Venice; San Secondo
- Nickname: 'il diseredato'

Giovanni de' Rossi (21 November 1431 – 1502) was an Italian condottiero and the fifth count of San Secondo. He was nicknamed 'il diseredato' (the disinherited).

== Biography ==
The eldest son of Pier Maria II de' Rossi and Antonia Torelli, he was born in San Secondo and was so different to his father (especially in politics) that he ended up disinheriting him in his 1464 will in favour of his legitimate sons Guido and Bernardo and his illegitimate son Ottaviano (Arluno). Giovanni was thus exiled with nothing and entered the service of the king of France, though he continued to claim the inheritance which had been denied him. When Pier Maria II died on 1 September 1482 in the midst of the Rossi War against Sforza troops under Ludovico il Moro and Pier Maria II's own son Guido, the succession became even more tangled. He attempted a last-ditch defence of the castle at San Secondo in 1483 before fleeing to Venice, where he died in exile in 1490.

Giovanni refused to back either side during the war, as did his brother Bertrando. However, thanks to good relations with Gian Giacomo Trivulzio, Trivulzio returned the fiefdom of San Secondo to Giovanni, by then an old man Between 1497 and 1499 Giovanni and Gian Giacomo served under Louis XII of France, and after Ludovico il Moro's fall the French king officially reinstated Giovanni in all his fiefdoms in 1499. He died at San Secondo in 1502 and was succeeded as count by his son Troilo I. The conflict provoked by Pier Maria II's will was finally fully resolved by the Battle of San Secondo in 1522.

== Marriage and issue ==
Giovanni married Angela Scotti Douglas, daughter of Francesco Scotti Douglas, count of Carpaneto and Vigoleno. They had four children:

- Troilo I de' Rossi (Note: not named with the others in his grandfather Pier Maria II's 1464 will, but referred to in all surviving sources in the Rossi family archives as Giovanni's son and in other fragments as Giovanni's son by Angela Scotti Douglas)
- Ettore de' Rossi
- Alessandro de' Rossi
- Pentesilea de' Rossi

== Sources ==
- Pellegri Marco, Il castello e la terra di San Secondo nella storia dell'arte, 1979
- Giuseppe Maria Cavalli, Cenni storici della Borgata di San Secondo, 1870
- Le signorie dei Rossi di Parma, am L. Arcangeli and M. Gentile (ed.), Florence 2008
