= Guido de' Rossi =

Italian mercenary captain (15th century)

Guido de' Rossi (c. 1440 - 1490) was an Italian condottiero.

== Life ==
He was almost certainly born in the castle at San Secondo, the residence of his father Pier Maria II de' Rossi. His mother was Pier Maria II's wife Antonia Torelli. Little is known of his youth: he served in the Duke of Milan's army and in 1478 was made governor of Pontremoli and Lunigiana. He is known to have been a condottiero and man-at-arms in 1479. In his will in 1464, Pier Maria II made Guido, his brother Bertrando and one of his illegitimate sons his heirs. This disinherited Pier Maria II's eldest son Giovanni.

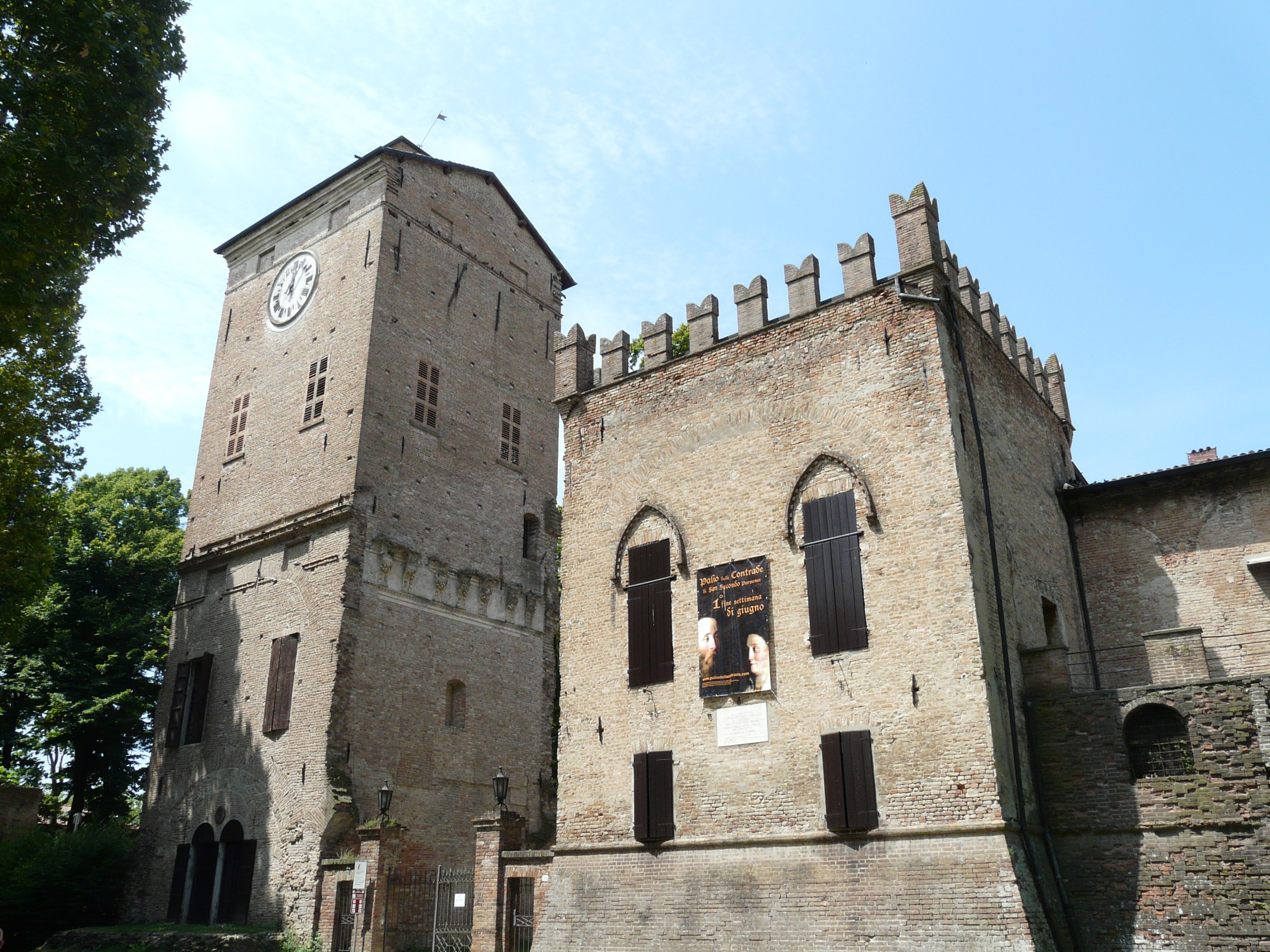
The Rocca dei Rossi in San Secondo.

Guido came to his father's aid during the Rossi War against Ludovico il Moro and was thus declared a rebel by the Duchy of Milan. He successfully held the Rocca dei Rossi in San Secondo against a Sforza siege under Antonio del Vasto (son of the marquess of Saluzzo), who was killed during the siege. Guido put a price on Sforza's head, but the situation soon worsened. He was promised Venetian reinforcements, but these were tied down in the War of Ferrara and could not reach him. Pier Maria II moved from San Secondo to Torrechiara, dying in the latter location on 1 September 1482. Some castles were betrayed, such as those at Carona, Bosco di Corniglio and Roccaferrara. San Secondo was still under siege - Guido attempted a night sortie on 12 September, but this failed.

The war against the Rossi was using up precious resources that were needed for the War of Ferrara, and so il Moro could not afford to prolong the siege. Guido's father-in-law Filippo Borromeo pushed him to accept a very unfavourable peace settlement. Guido personally went into the enemy camp, where he was offered an end to the siege and to hostilities as a whole in return for swearing fealty to the Duchy of Milan, disarming and giving up several territories and his castles. He accepted and in the end even gave up several annexations and territories and his castles on the border with Parma as well as handing over his son Filippo Maria as a hostage. The Venetians stoked the brothers' feud, however, and the Sforza family soon found a pretext to renew it in the form of Torelli family's alliance and a Venetian provveditore's reception at the castle at Torrechiara. They declared Guido a public enemy on 18 January 1483, and Sforza Secondo Sforza, count of Borgonovo, attacked him, forcing him to retreat into Piacentine territory. After skirmishes in the Nure valley, Guido moved into the territory of the Republic of Genoa, losing the 33 castles remaining to him after the 1482 peace settlement - even the castle at San Secondo surrendered on 21 June that year.

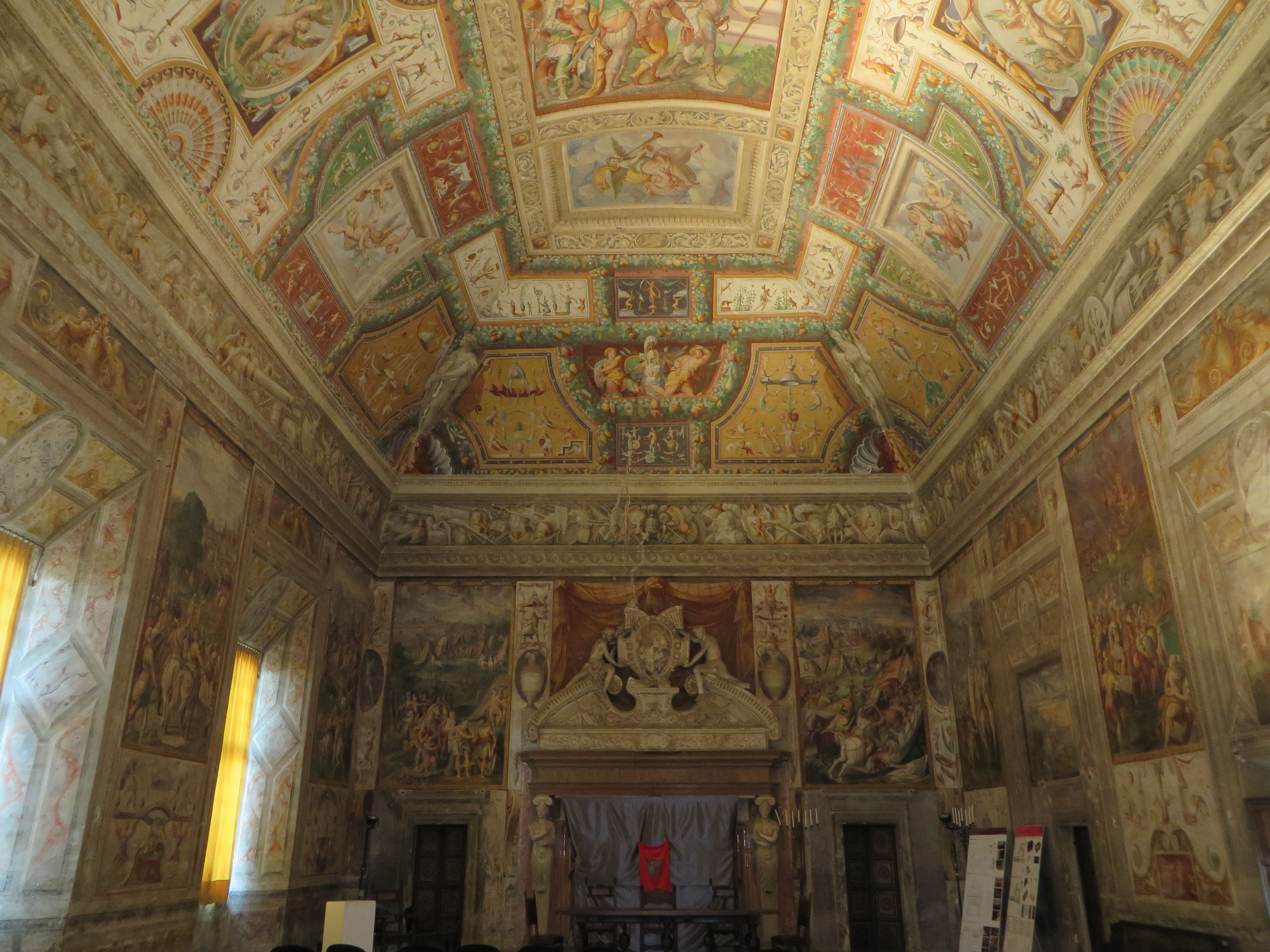
The sala delle Gesta Rossiane in the Rocca di Rossi, with paintings showing Guido's conduct at Calliano.

The Peace of Bagnolo ended the War of Ferrara on 7 August 1484, but instead of returning the Rossi family lands to the Rossi, the treaty handed them directly to il Moro to distribute among his favourites. Guido thus moved to Venice, where he was given an annual allowance as a condottiero and a company of 200 men-at-arms and 300 mounted archers. He led this force in the war between Venice and the County of Tyrol, provoked by Sigismund of Austria over tax issues. At the decisive battle of Calliano on 1 August 1487, when the Venetian commander-in-chief Roberto Sanseverino was killed and surrender seemed inevitable, Guido took over command and made a surprise attack on the German troops with 300 mounted archers, including his son Filippo Maria. This forced the Tyroleans to retreat to Trento with heavy losses. In his "Historia vinitiana" Pietro Bembo wrote:

Only lord Guido Maria de' Rossi with his company of cavalry, having first made a route through the enemy by force of arms and by courage, and having saved himself on the plain, met the Germans - over-confident of victory - and turned them back. He showed what great deeds of combat [and] what feats of arms the soul and the constancy can do. He killed part of their force and forced the others to flee, and in this guise showed the clearest victory over the defeated enemy (which only sometimes happens).

Guido died in Venice in 1490 and was buried there at Santa Maria della Carità.

== Marriage and issue ==
He married Ambrosina Borromeo, with whom he had six children:

- Bernardo de' Rossi, bishop of Treviso
- Giovanni Maria
- Filippo Maria de' Rossi, his heir
- Ettore
- Betrando, died young in Venice
- Giovanna, married Gianbattista Malaspina, marquess of Spinola
