= Castello di Roccabianca =

Castle in Roccabianca, Italy

Coordinates: 45.0088°N 10.2195°E

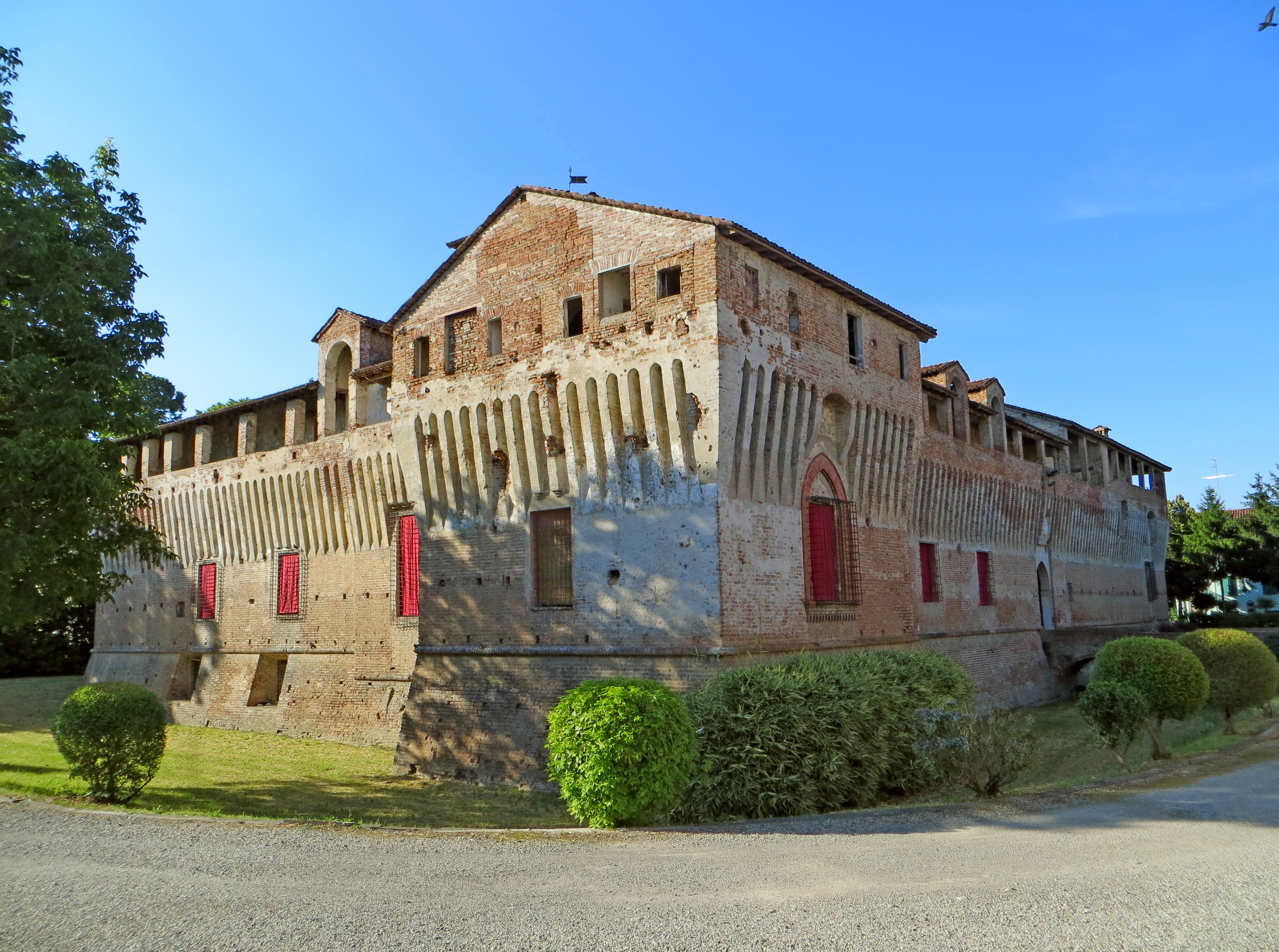
South facade of the castle

The Castello or Castle of Roccabianca, also called Rocca dei Rossi, is a castle built in the town of Roccabianca, province of Parma, Emilia Romagna, northern Italy.

It was built and decorated in 1460 by the lord of San Secondo, Pier Maria II de' Rossi, for his great love Bianca Pellegrini. From the Rossi family, it passed to the Pallavicino, and later to the Rangoni family. In 1831, the castle was acquired by Maria Luigia of Parma, becoming a direct possession of the Duchy of Parma.

The castle has undergone much despoiling, most prominently a 15th-century cycle of frescoes depicting the Story of Griselda da Saluzzo from the novel of Decameron of Boccaccio, which was detached and taken to Milan. A copy was frescoed in the 20th century. Other rooms contain allegorical frescoes, portraits, and landscapes.

The castle is now used for cultural and private events. It houses the Museum of Distilling.

== See also ==
- Castles of the Duchy
