= Pieve di San Genesio, San Secondo Parmense =

Church in San Secondo Parmense, Italy

Coordinates: 44°55′20″N 10°12′08″E

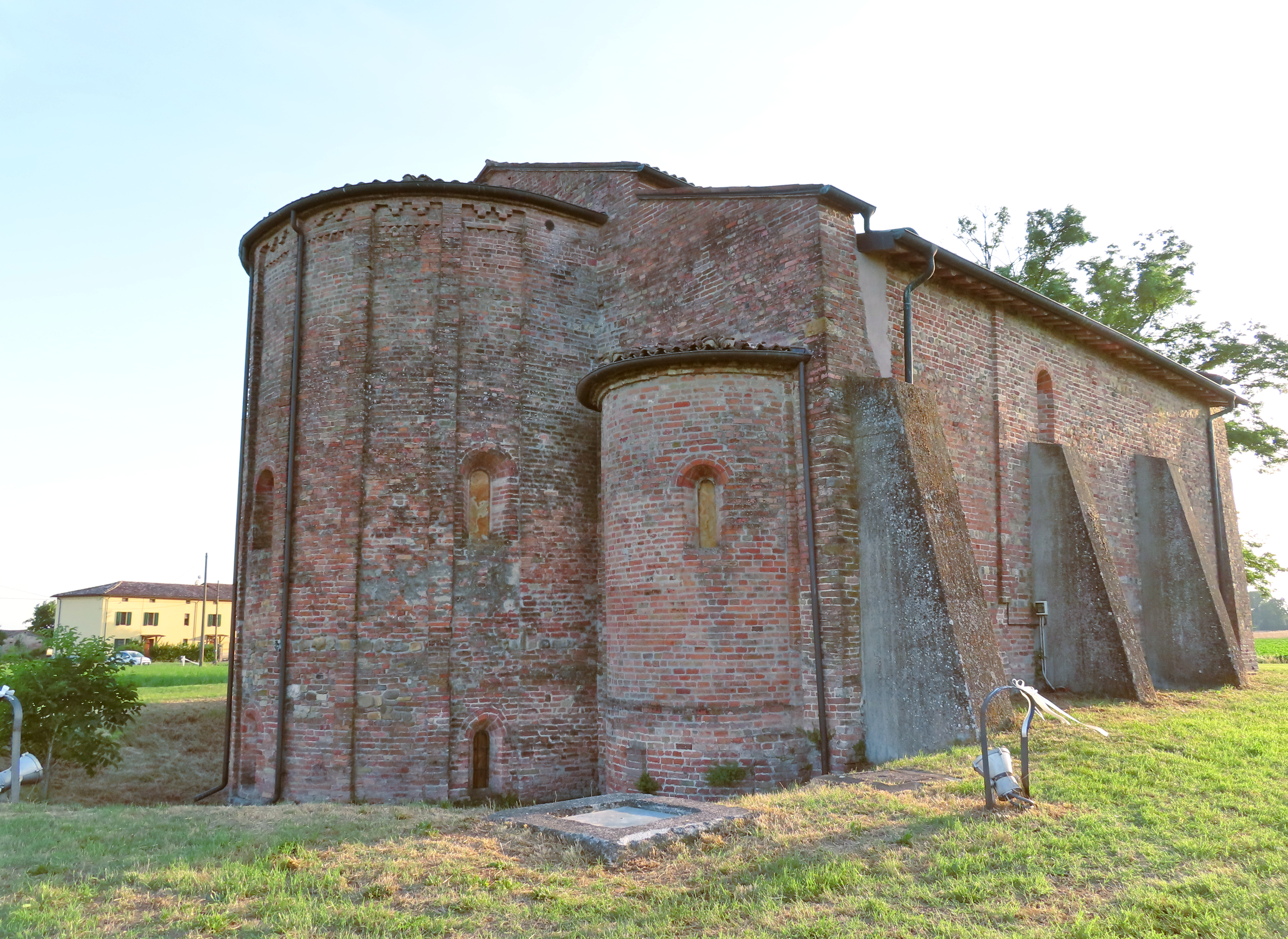
View of the apses from the northeast

San Genesio is a Romanesque architecture, Roman Catholic pieve, or rural parish church, on the road to Busseto, outside of San Secondo Parmense, province of Parma, Emilia-Romagna, northern Italy.

The church is known from documentation from 1084. It is cited as a pieve church by 1195. The present structure seems to have been completed over the centuries: the lower part of the apse derives from an early church of the 11th century. After a flood of the river Taro in the 13th century, the church was reconstructed in the present layout with three semicircular apses and a nave divided on each side by seven arches. It appears the population of the area also moved after 1470, when the new town center of San Secondo was founded with a new parish church (Annunziata) by Pier Maria II de' Rossi. By 1787, the church was deconsecrated, and being used as a home and warehouse. The length of the nave was shortened and the new, present facade was built. In 1967–72, a restoration attempted to highlight the early romanesque elements.
