= Sissa, Sissa Trecasali =

Sissa
- Comune
- Comune di Sissa
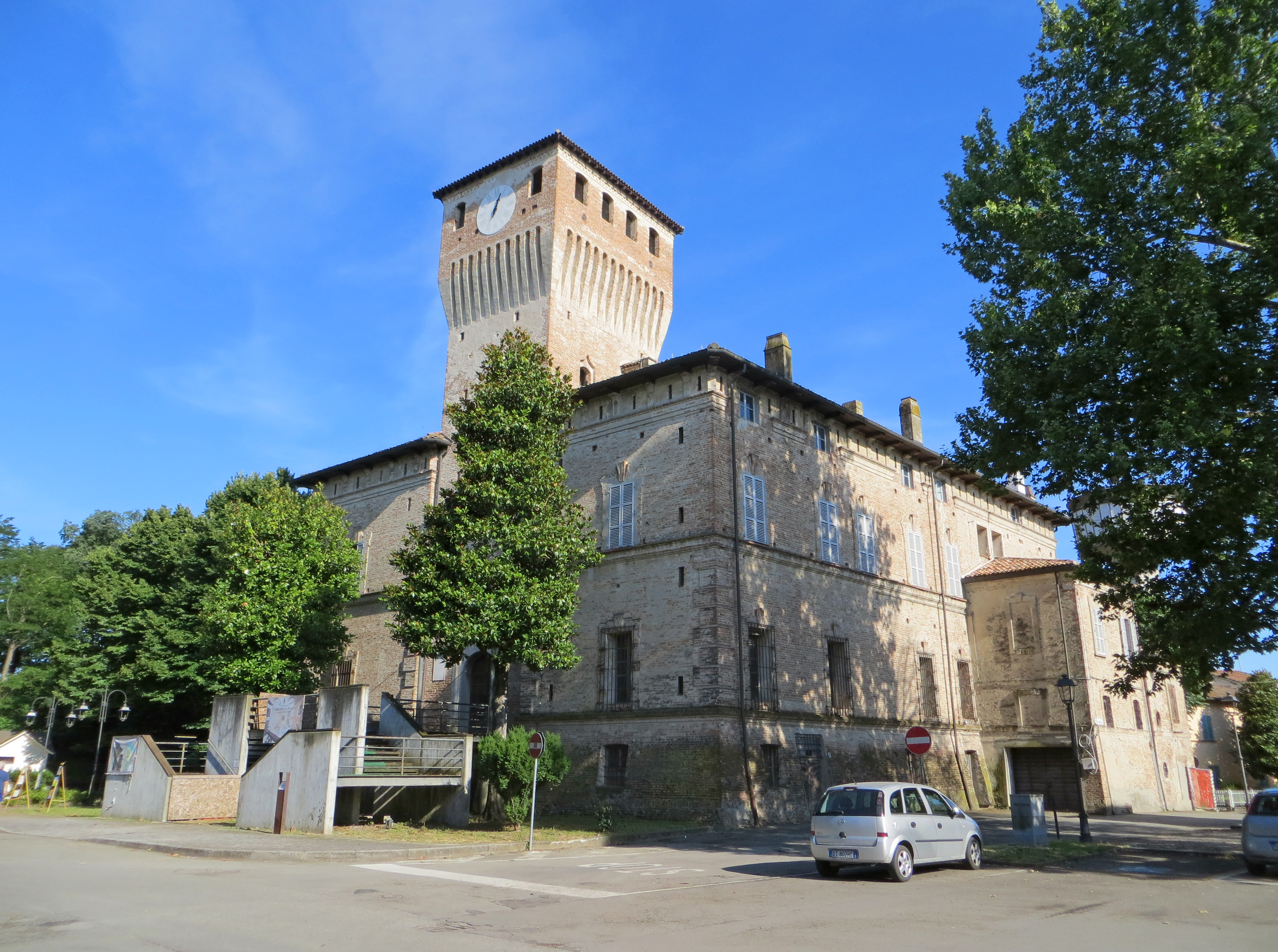
- Castle

- Coat of arms

- Location within Italy Location within Emilia-Romagna
- Coordinates: 44°58′N 10°16′E
- Country: Italy
- Region: Emilia-Romagna
- Province: Parma (PR)
- Frazioni: Borghetta, Borgonovo, Casalfoschino, Coltaro, Gramignazzo, Palasone, San Nazzaro, Torricella

Government
  - Mayor: Grazia Cavanna

Area
  - Total: 42.9 km^{2} (16.6 sq mi)

Population (30 June 2009)
  - Total: 4,286
  - Density: 99.9/km^{2} (259/sq mi)
- Demonym: Sissesi
- Time zone: UTC+1 (CET)
  - Summer (DST): UTC+2 (CEST)
- Postal code: 43018
- Dialing code: 0521
- Patron saint: St. James
- Saint day: 7 April

Sissa is a town in the Italian region of Emilia-Romagna. Administratively, it is a frazione of the comune of Sissa Trecasali in the Province of Parma. It was an independent comune until it was merged in 2014 with Trecasali to form Sissa Trecasali. It is located about 100 kilometres (62 mi) northwest of Bologna and about 20 kilometres (12 mi) northwest of Parma.

Sissa borders the following municipalities: Colorno, Gussola, Martignana di Po, Roccabianca, San Secondo Parmense, Torricella del Pizzo, Torrile, Trecasali. The town is home to a Pork carnival in November, known as the Sapori del Maiale.

== Main sights ==
- Rocca dei Terzi
