= Rocca dei Rossi =

Coordinates: 44°55′13″N 10°13′35″E

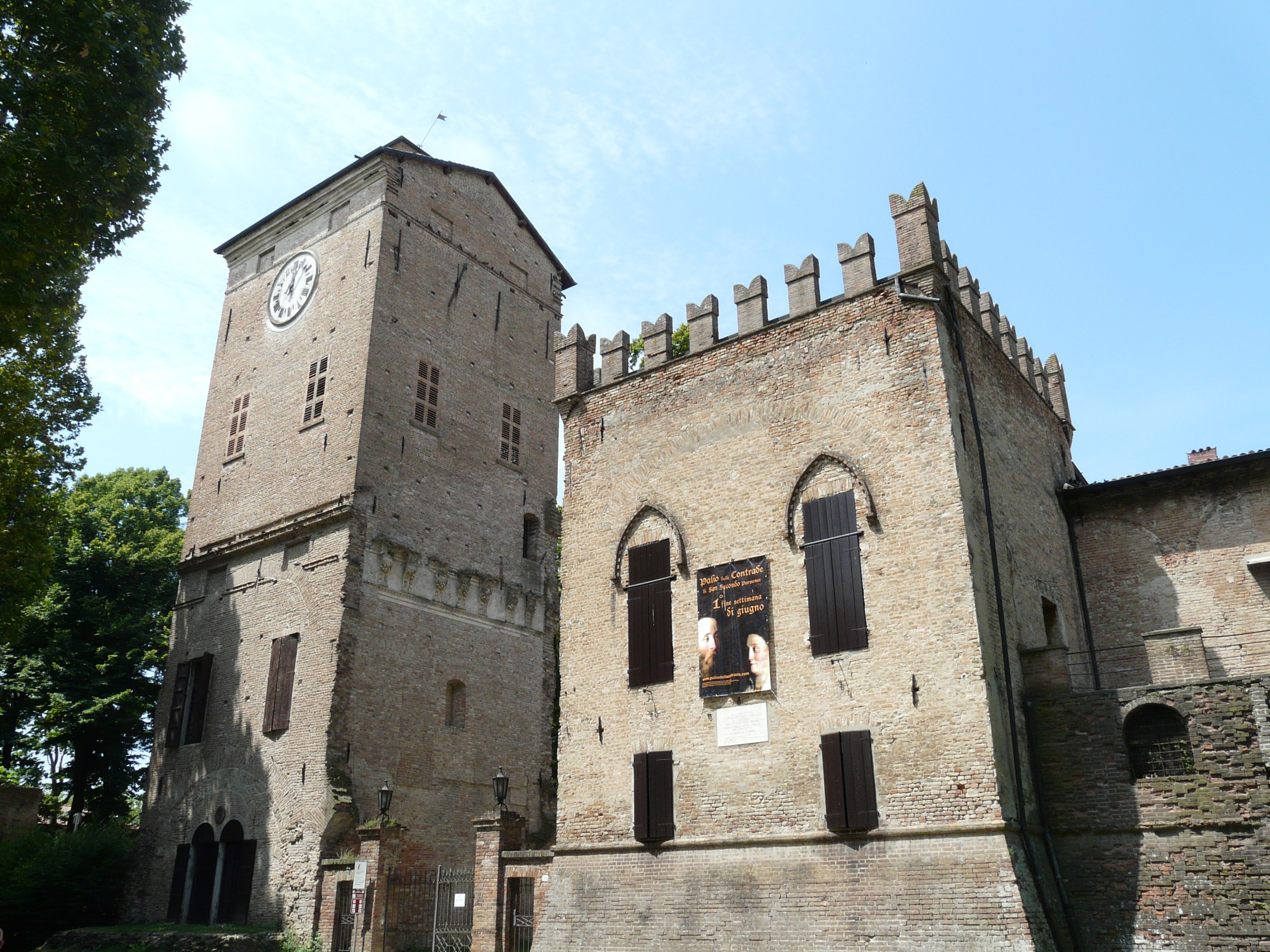
Rocca dei Rossi.

Rocca dei Rossi is a castle located at piazza Mazzini #12 in the town of San Secondo Parmense, province of Parma, in the Italian region Emilia-Romagna. A different Rocca dei Rossi, also known as Castello di Roccabianca, is located in the town of Roccabianca.

== History ==
The castle was built on an elevated land in 1413 by Pier Maria I de' Rossi, father of Pier Maria II, to defend the fortified borough of San Secondo, which had been a family fief since the 12th century. The rocca sites on the opposite shore of the Taro river than the borough, and also used its water to fill a defensive moat.

The stronghold was later turned into a luxurious manor decorated with 16th-century frescoes by local artists. The last heir of the Rossi family donated the castle back to the Municipality of San Secondo, and henceforth was used as Town hall until 2007. The manor is open to tours of its architecture and artwork all year.

== Castle ==
Only the northwest wing and the northeast façade remain of the 16th century structure. During the last part of the 19th century, a large part of the castle was destroyed. The Renaissance courtyard, the main staircase and the reception hall, and the frescoes on the piano nobile remain. In 1983, an earthquake caused considerable damage to the building, requiring extensive restructuring. Today, guided tours of the castle are held regularly with performers dressed in historic costumes. In the first week of June, the Rocca provides the stage for a traditional Palio of San Secondo, contested among the various contrade of the town, and the theatrical representation of the marriage between Pier Maria III de' Rossi and Camilla Gonzaga, originally celebrated on 13 February 1523.

== Art ==
In the 16th century, the Rossi castle was decorated with frescoes depicting secular themes by prominent disciples of Giulio Romano, including by Baglione, Orazio Samacchini, il Bertoja, Procaccini and Paganino. The extravagant decoration was due to a wish by the Rossi not to appear inferior to the new lords of Parma, the Farnese.

Main artworks include:

- The Hall of Bellerophon. Beyond the courtyard and the main staircase, this grand hall houses the most important equipment for the San Secondo Palio. On the ceiling is a fresco of Bellerophon killing the chimaera, a monster with the heads of a lion, of a dragon and of a goat, representing the fight between Good and Evil.
- The Hall of Justice, completely frescoed by Baglione.
- Aesop’s Gallery and The Hall of Fables show frescoes illustrating popular fables, including "The Fox and the Wild Pig", "The Fox and the Lion", "The Dog and the Rooster" and "The Wolf and the Lamb".
- The Hall of the Golden Donkey has 17 paintings from Apuleius' Golden Ass. The story runs counterclockwise around the room starting at the bottom strip and concludes at the center of the vault.

== See also ==
- Castles of the Duchy

== Sources ==
- Guerrieri, Daniela (2006). Castelli del Ducato di Parma e Piacenza. NLF.
