= Barbara Sanseverino =

Italian noblewoman

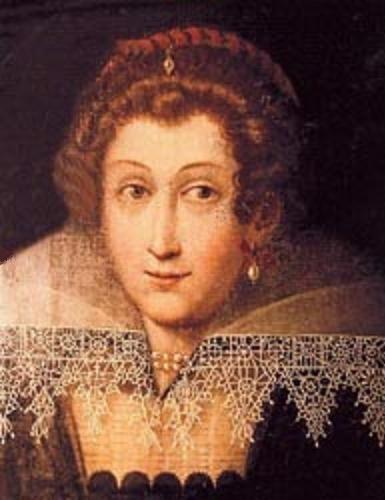
- Portrait of Barbara Sanseverino
- Born: 1550; Milan
- Died: 19 May 1612 (aged 61–62); Parma
- Noble family: House of Sanseverino
- Spouses: Giberto IV Sanvitale (–1585); Orazio Simonetta (1596–1612)
- Issue: Girolamo Sanvitale
- Father: Gianfrancesco Sanseverino
- Mother: Lavinia Sanseverino

Barbara Sanseverino (Milan, 1550 – Parma, 19 May 1612) was an Italian noblewoman.

== Biography ==
Daughter of Gianfrancesco and Lavinia Sanseverino, she moved to Parma after marrying Giberto IV Sanvitale, Lord of Sala Baganza. In 1585 Giberto died in Piacenza under mysterious circumstances and her son Girolamo was invested by Ottavio Farnese, Duke of Colorno, with the obligation to acquire the surname and the coat of arms of the House of Sanseverino, native to the Kingdom of Naples.

She was confidant and mistress of Vincenzo I Gonzaga, Duke of Mantua, who temporarily moved for her from Mantua to Viadana in 1580. These escapades took place at the time when Vincenzo I Gonzaga visited the Court of Ferrara to meet Margherita Farnese.

After being widowed in 1596, Barbara married Count Orazio Simonetta, Overlord of Torricella, and moved to Colorno, to put order in her life.

=== The "Conspiracy of the Overlords" against the Farnese ===
At the time the aim of Ranuccio Farnese to take control of Colorno became clearer every day. By speculating on hereditary quarrels, the Duke started to claim that the investiture of Colorno to the Sanvitale family had to be considered null; thus began a lawsuit based on the feudal law, in which the most notable jurists of the time were involved. When they realized that the odds were against them, the Sanvitale had the idea of a conspiracy to remove Ranuccio and reassert their rights.

Many adhered to this secret plan: Barbara and her second husband Orazio Simonetta, her firstborn Girolamo and his child Gianfrancesco, Alfonso II Sanvitale, Count Girolamo da Correggio, Count Alberto of Canossa, the Marquise of Grana Agnese del Carretto, Oliviero Olivieri, Onofrio Martani and other gentlemen and gentlewomen.

The attack should have been carried out in the church of Fontevivo, at the baptism of the nephew of Ranuccio, Alessandro. However the plan went differently since one of the servants of Gianfrancesco, imprisoned and tortured for some reasons not related to the conspiracy, exposed several names and statements which alerted the justice.

The conspiracy was uncovered and all the plotters were arrested. The inquisitorial trial, conducted by Judge Piossasco, was ruthless; all the attempts of the conspirators to deny their true intentions were worthless. On May 4, 1612, the trial resulted in a death sentence for all and the confiscation of their goods. On May 19, 1612, in Parma, Barbara and nine other plotters were publicly beheaded on a stage built close to Piazza Garibaldi. The headsman proved unable to sever Barbara's neck with the axe and had to complete the task with a smaller, more manageable butcher's cleaver. Immediately afterwards, amidst the cheers of the audience, he desecrated the corpse by lifting her dress and spanking her bottom in front of everyone as a sign of contempt.

Ranuccio accused the Duke of Mantua Ferdinando Gonzaga, and three small Malaspina feudal lords from the Lunigiana and the Vara valley of conspiracy, allegedly for having offered a sum of money to accomplish the plot. The Duke threatened to take up arms against the Farnese, but first Pope Paul V and then the Kings of France and Spain and Charles Emmanuel of Savoy mediated and a compromise was found.

== Literary references ==
Famous for her beauty, poet Torquato Tasso dedicated the sonnet In lode de' capelli di D. Barbara Sanseverini Contessa di Sala to her.

The case of Barbara Sanseverino and the conspiracy was recounted by Alfredo Zerbini in the historical poem, written in Parmigiano dialect, La congiura di Feudatäri, published in 1947. The poem consists of eighty sonnets, divided into four parts of twenty sonnets each: I Feudatäri, La Congiura, Al Procèss and La Gran Giustissia.

== Bibliography ==
- Coniglio, Giuseppe (1973). I Gonzaga. Varese: Dall'Oglio. [ISBN unspecified]
- Bellonci, Maria (1947). Segreti dei Gonzaga. Verona. ISBN 978-88-04-49300-6.
