= Ducal Palace of Guastalla =

Coordinates: 44.9225°N 10.6543°E

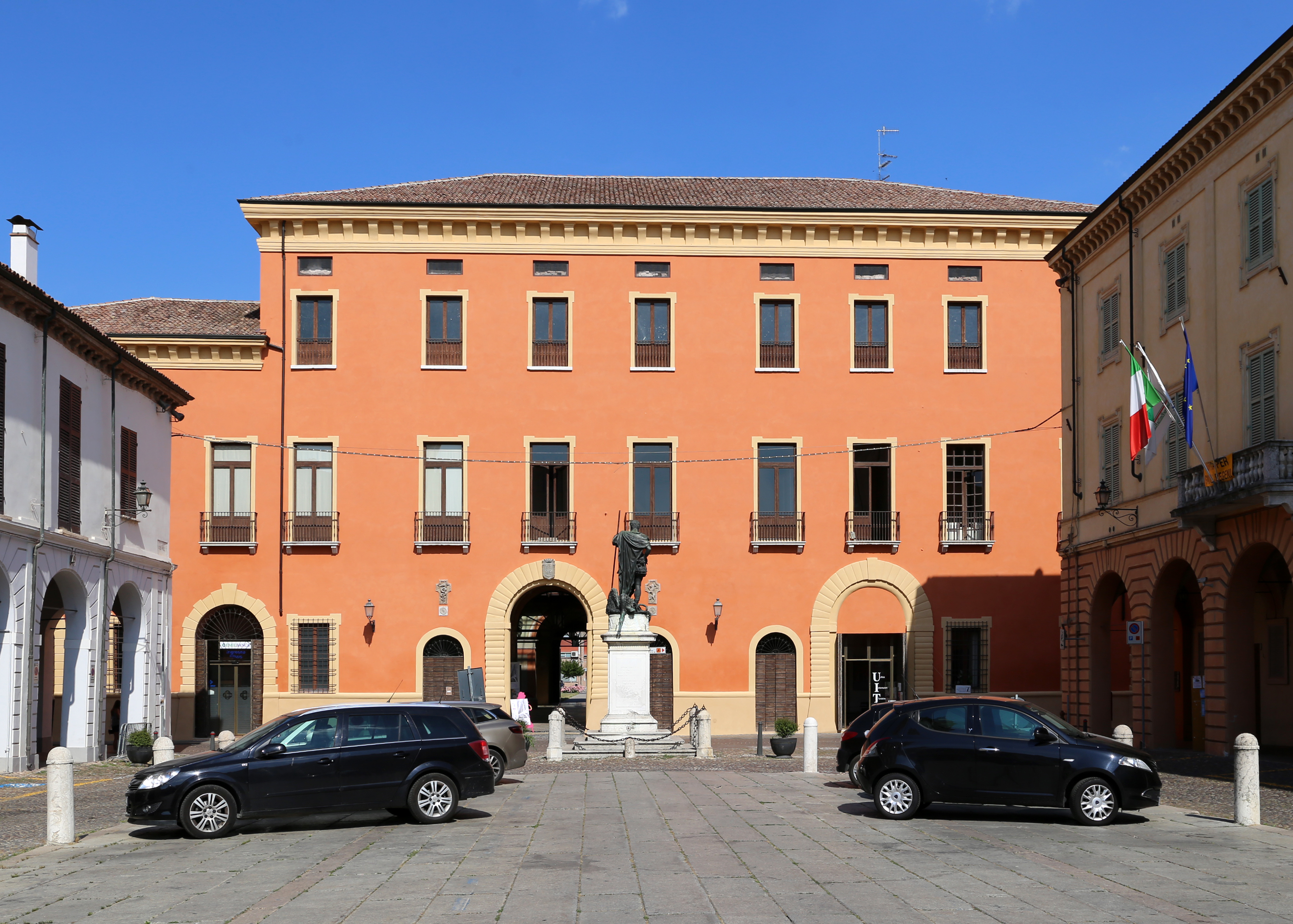
- Interactive map of the Ducal Palace of Guastalla area

General information
- Architectural style: Renaissance
- Location: Italy

The Ducal Palace of Guastalla (Palazzo Ducale di Guastalla or Palazzo Gonzaga di Guastalla) is an urban Renaissance-style palace in the town of Guastalla, a municipality in the Province of Reggio Emilia, Emilia-Romagna, Italy.

It was built on the site of a 15th-century palazzo of the Conti Torelli family, and rebuilt in the next century by Francesco Capriana (Francesco da Volterra), under commission to the Count of Guastalla, Cesare I Gonzaga. Neglected for years, it is currently a museum of the city. It contains art works from antique Roman cemeteries, paintings from deconsecrated chapels and oratories, as well as an exhibit of the modern watercolor painters Mario Bolzoni.

== See also ==
- Castles of the Duchy
