= San Vitale, Sala Baganza =

Church in Emilia-Romagna, Italy

Coordinates: 44.6662°N 10.1894°E

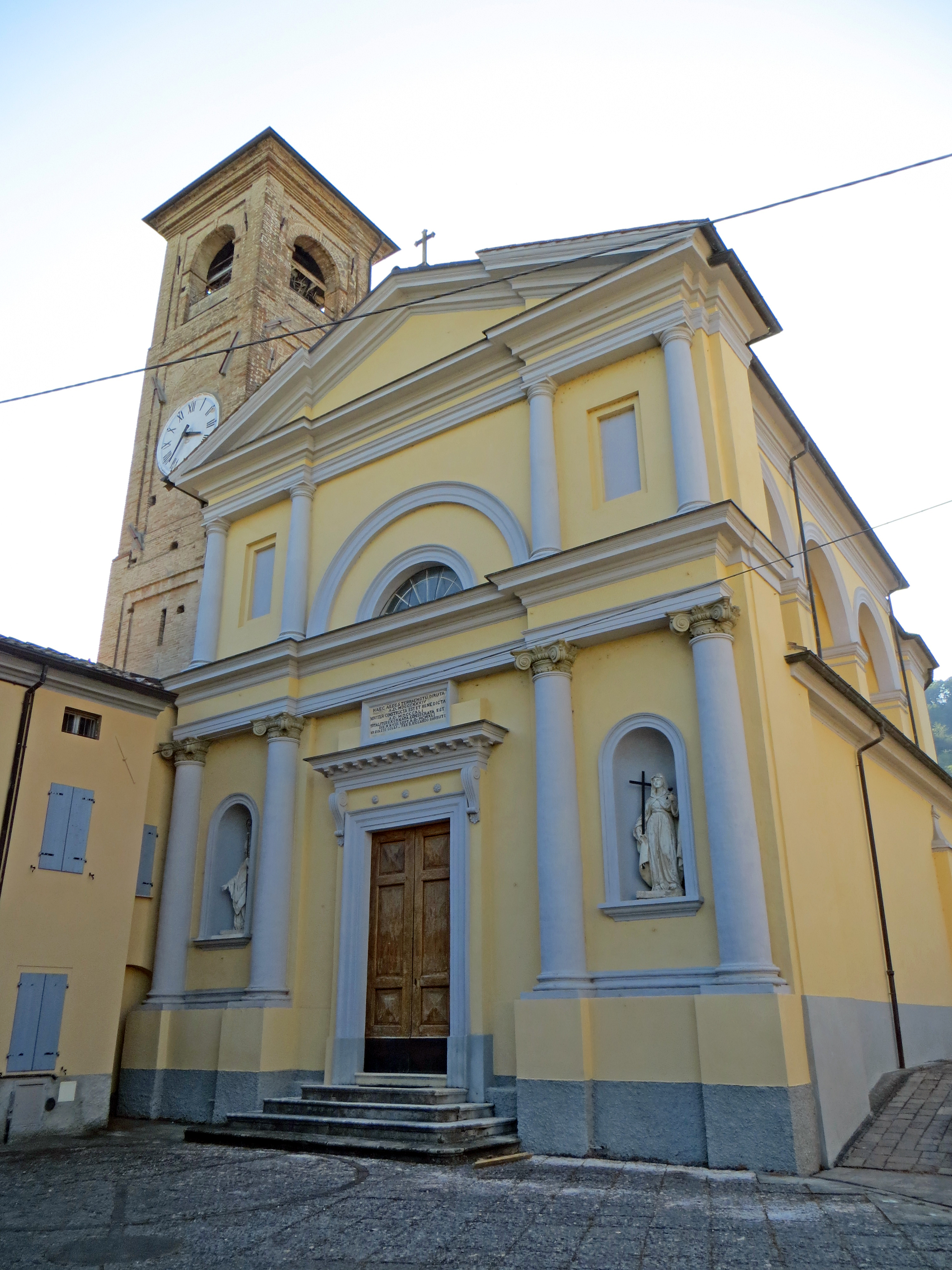
Facade and belltower.

San Vitale is a Roman Catholic parish church located in the San Vitale neighborhood of Sala Baganza, region of Emilia-Romagna, Italy. The Neoclassical church houses altarpieces by Giuseppe Peroni, including a Madonna between Santi Gregorio and Vitale.

A small parish church at the site is first mentioned by the year 1005. By 1142, the church and the nearby castle and hamlet belonged to the Abbey of San Giovanni Evangelista of Parma. In the 18th century, a bell-tower was erected, but this and the church were partially ruined by an earthquake on 14 February 1834. The church was rebuilt using designs of Lorenzo Raschi, with work completed by 1841. The facade was designed by Luigi Bianchi, and completed in 1868. The facade statuary, attributed to Agostino Ferrarini, was added in 1885. On 23 December 2008, an earthquake again damaged the building, and restructuring and restoration was completed in 2012.
