= Giuseppe Peroni =

Italian painter (1700–1776)

Giuseppe Peroni (6 May 1710 – 22 September 1776) was an Italian painter of the late Baroque period known for his religious paintings.

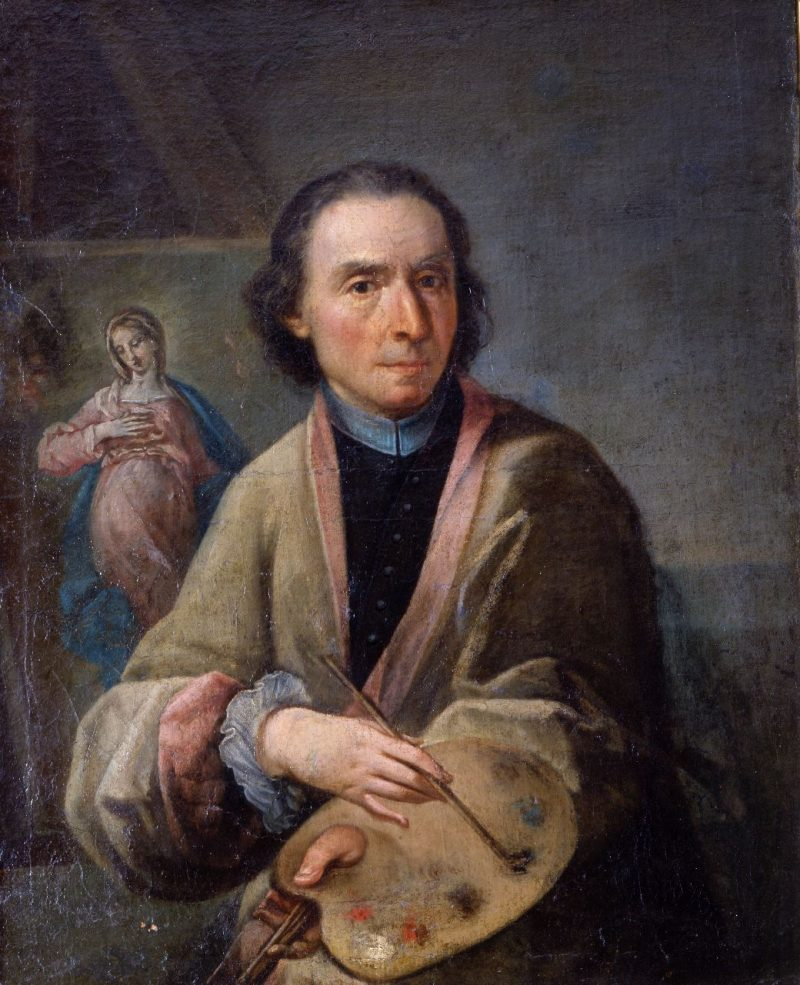
Self-portrait, 1760

== Biography ==
He painted in the pre-eminent style of his time, the grand manner of Carlo Maratta. In Rome, he attended the Academy of France in Rome and the Accademia di San Luca, where he formed a friendship with the painter and caricaturist Pier Leone Ghezzi. In 1738, Giuseppe won a first prize for painting submitted to an exhibition at the Accademia di San Luca. He became a priest by 1744. Returning to Parma, he became active in teaching at the local Academy of Fine Arts (founded 1757) and painting mostly altarpieces for churches.

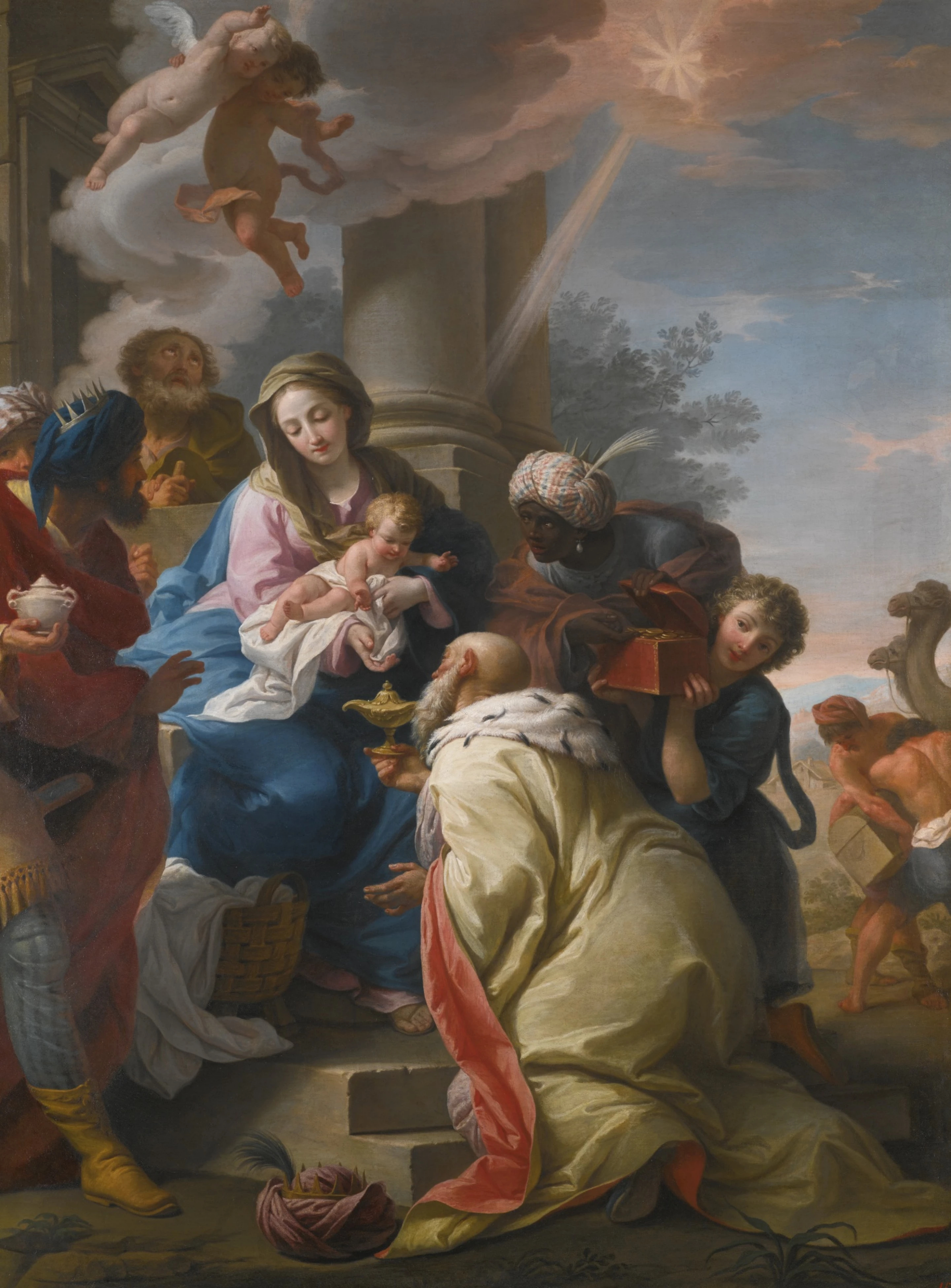
Adoration of the Magi

He painted a The Magdalene at the feet of Christ (1757) for the Certosa di Pavia, St Camillo de Lellis for the church of Santa Maria della Visitazione (Chiesa della Madonnina) in Ferrara. He painted a Marriage of the Virgin for the Cathedral of Santa Maria del Popolo in Pontremoli. In Parma, he painted frescoes for the church of San Vitale, a St John the Baptist for the no longer extant church of San Cecilia, a canvas of St Francesco di Sales for the church of San Giuseppe, and a Martyrdom of San Bartolomeo for the church of San Bartolomeo. He painted two altarpieces for the church of San Vitale in Sala Baganza. He also painted frescoes in the Savoy castle of Casotto in Garessio. He also painted for churches in Turin.

In Parma, his pupils included Domenico Muzzi and Gaetano Callani. He died in Parma in 1676.
