= Vittorio Casaretti =

Italian footballer

Personal information
- Date of birth: 24 October 1922
- Place of birth: Trecasali, Italy
- Position: Midfielder

Senior career*
Years	Team	Apps	(Gls)
1941–1942	Ambrosiana-Inter	8	(0)
1945–1947	Gallaratese		
- * Club domestic league appearances and goals

Vittorio Casaretti (born 24 October 1922) is an Italian retired professional football player.
