= San Michele Arcangelo, Trecasali =

Church in Sissa Trecasali, Italy

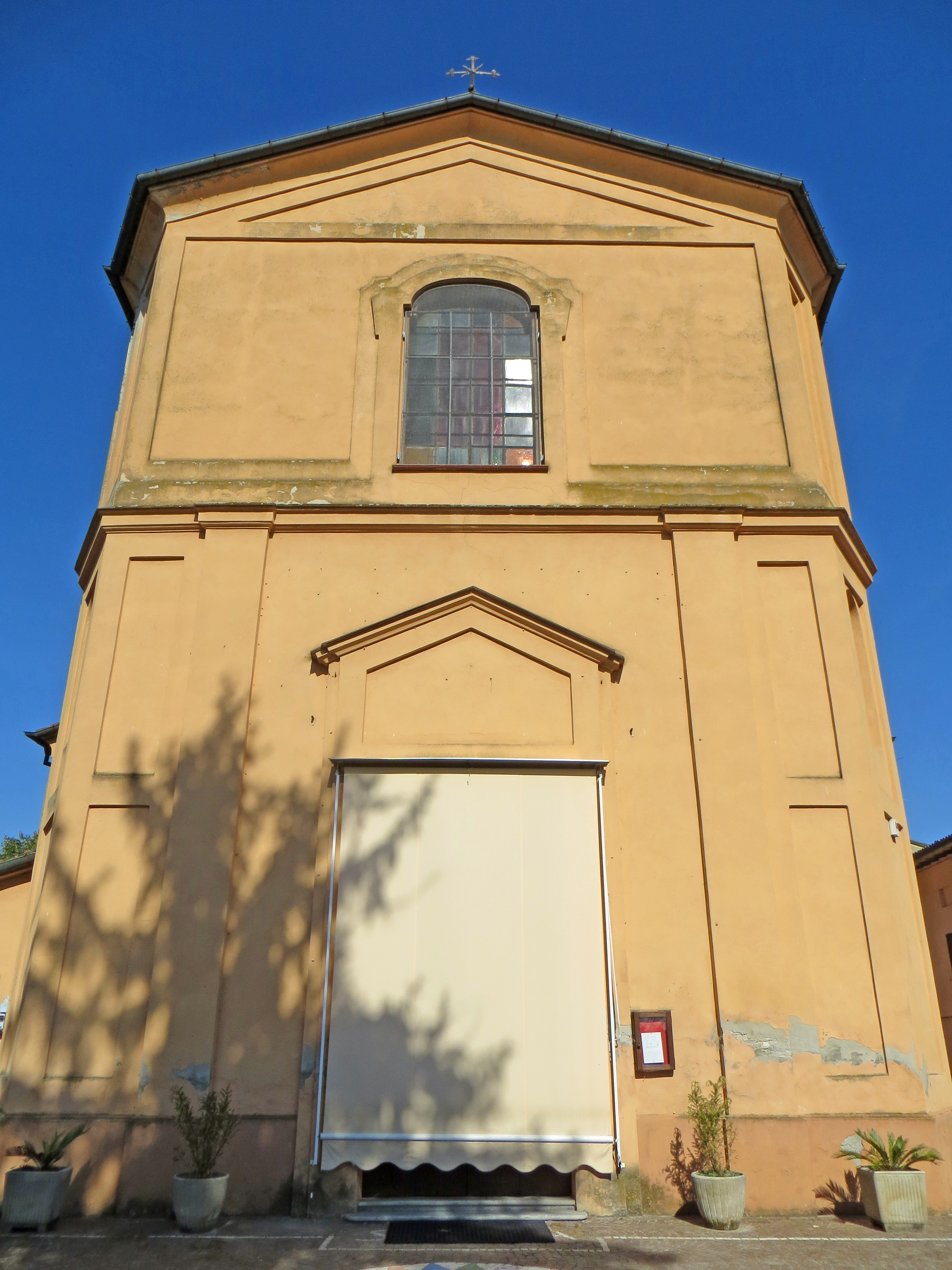
Church of San Michele (Trecasali) - facade

San Michele Arcangelo or St Michael Archangel is a Baroque style, Roman Catholic parish church in Trecasali, Province of Parma, Italy.

A church at the site is documented since the 13th, century, however, the present structure was built 1740–1766. The interior has frescoes by Paolo Ferrari depicting: St Michael defeats the Demons, the Story of Moses, the Story of St Michael, The Four Evangelists, and St Peter in Glory within stucco decoration by Fortunato Rusca.

The main altarpiece depicts St Michael defeating the Devil (1768), by Gaetano Callani, a copy of a Raphael's St. Michael Vanquishing Satan found in the Louvre museum. The frame of the altarpiece was created by Ignazio Marchetti.
