= Castello of Compiano =

Coordinates: 44.4965°N 9.6628°E

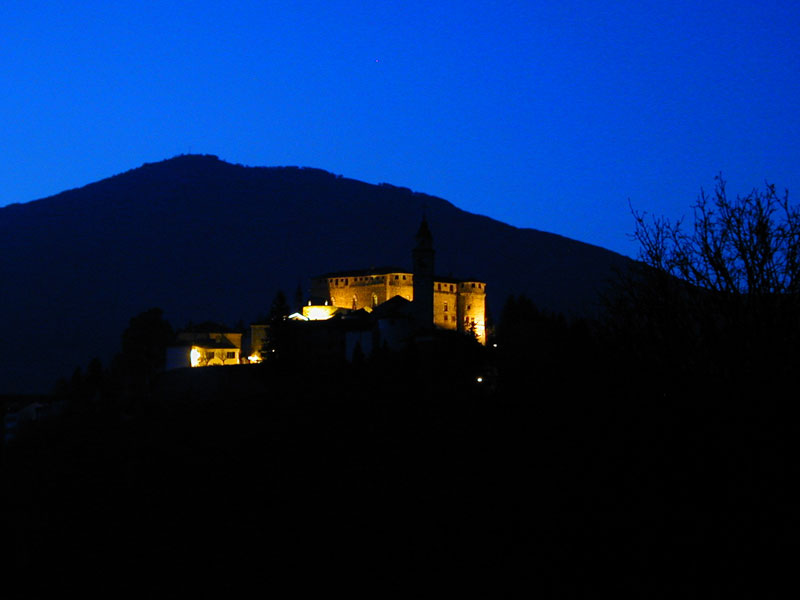
Castello di Compiano at night.

Castello di Compiano is a castle at the top of Compiano's hill, in the province of Parma, northern Italy.

== History ==
It is believed to have been built in the early Middle Ages by the Lombards, on the road which links the neighbouring Emilia and Liguria. It first belonged to the Malaspina family, then to the Commune of Piacenza and, finally, to the Landi family which ruled the area for 425 consecutive years, eventually forming a small independent principality, the Landi State.

Between the 16th and the 17th centuries, Compiano was in its prime, and minted its own currency, opened state schools and started a pawn system. In the 18th century Compiano passed from the Farnese to the Borbone family, and was then annexed to the realm of Maria Luigia of Austria, then Duchess of Parma, who used the castle as a State prison for Carbonari captives in 1821.

Before World War II it was used as a girls' orphanage. After the war ended, the school was closed down and the castle was bought by Marchioness Lina Raimondi Gambarotta who, after her death in 1987, left it to the Compiano municipality.

Built on a rocky spur which dominates the river Taro, the castle is similar to a projection from the surrounding fortified walls.

== Compiano Masonic Museum ==
Since July 2002, the castle hosts the International Masonic Museum Orizzonti Massonici, the only museum of this kind in Italy. The three rooms dedicated to this museum contain precious relics, such as medallions, paintings, and honours belonging to the British Masonic symbolism used in the 18th and 19th Century; one of the rooms, called room 33, holds various Italian relics and objects displayed by the Italian Masonic association Grande Oriente d'Italia - Palazzo Giustiniani.

== See also ==
- Castles of the Duchy
