= Elena De Rossi Filibeck =

Elena De Rossi Filibeck is a writer on Tibetan subjects. She graduated in East Asian History under Professor Luciano Petech in 1971 at the Sapienza University of Rome. Since 1980, she has been a researcher at the Department of Oriental Studies in the Faculty of Arts, Sapienza University of Rome, and Associate Professor at the Faculty of Oriental Studies of the same university. Her publications cover many aspects of Tibetan textual studies, most notably from Tabo Monastery. Since 1980, she has dedicated her professional life to cataloguing the Tucci Tibetan Fund texts, numbering more than a thousand. The first volume of the catalogue was published in 1994, and in the preface Petech praises her achievements and speaks warmly of her as a friend.

== Bibliography (selection) ==
- 1977: Testi Tibetani riguardanti i Gorkha, Memorie dell'Accademia dei Lincei, Rome (in Italian)
- 1988: Two Tibetan Guide Books to Ti se and La phyi, Monumenta Tibetica Historica, VGH Wissenschaftsverlag, Bonn
- 1994: Catalogue of the Tucci Tibetan Fund in the Library of IsMEO, Rome, volume I, ISBN 978-88-85320-76-5
- 2003: Catalogue of the Tucci Tibetan Fund in the Library of IsAO, Rome, volume II, ISBN 978-88-85320-77-2
