= Compiano =

- Comune
- Comune di Compiano
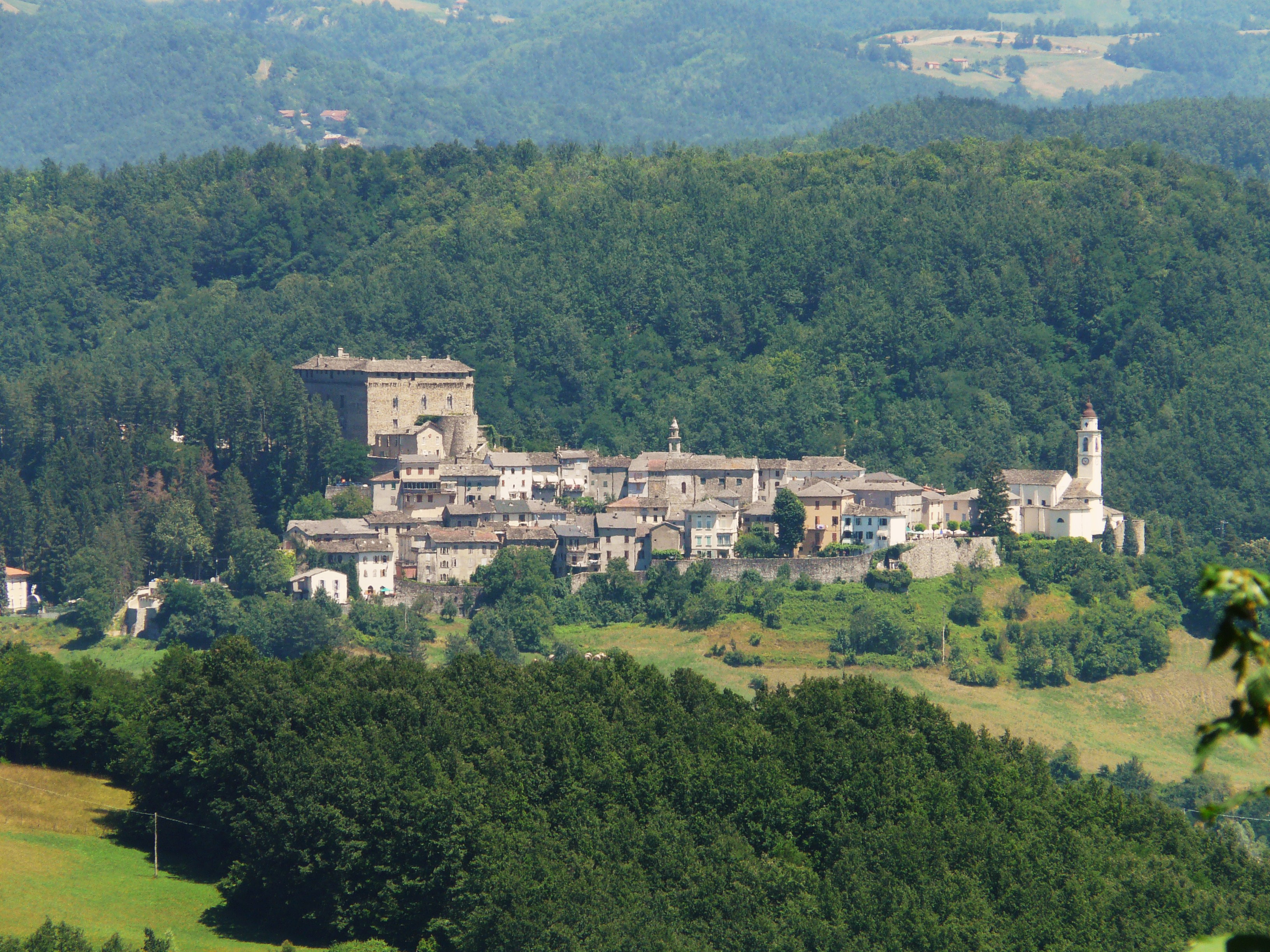
- Compiano

- Coat of arms

- Location within Italy Location within Emilia-Romagna
- Coordinates: 44°29′50″N 09°39′45″E
- Country: Italy
- Region: Emilia-Romagna
- Province: Parma (PR)
- Frazioni: Barbigarezza, Breia, Caboara, Casello, Cereseto, Costa, Farfanaro, Isola, Piano Moglie, Ponte, Rio, Roncodesiderio, Sambuceto, Strela, Sugremaro, Trario

Government
  - Mayor: Sabina Delnevo

Area
  - Total: 37 km^{2} (14 sq mi)

Population (31 May 2007)
  - Total: 1,092
  - Density: 30/km^{2} (76/sq mi)
- Time zone: UTC+1 (CET)
  - Summer (DST): UTC+2 (CEST)
- Postal code: 43053
- Dialing code: 050
- Website: Official website

Compiano (Parmigiano: Cumpiàn) is a medieval walled town in the Taro Valley (Parmesan Apennines), a 50 minute-drive to the Ligurian Sea and Parma. It is one of I Borghi più belli d'Italia ("The most beautiful villages of Italy").

The top of Compiano's hill is home to the medieval Castello di Compiano.

== History ==
It was said the Grimaldis, the royal family of Monaco, have their roots right here. A marble plate hung on the castle wall reports all the royal families that have inhabited the castle since 800 AD.
