= Roccabianca =

- Comune
- Comune di Roccabianca
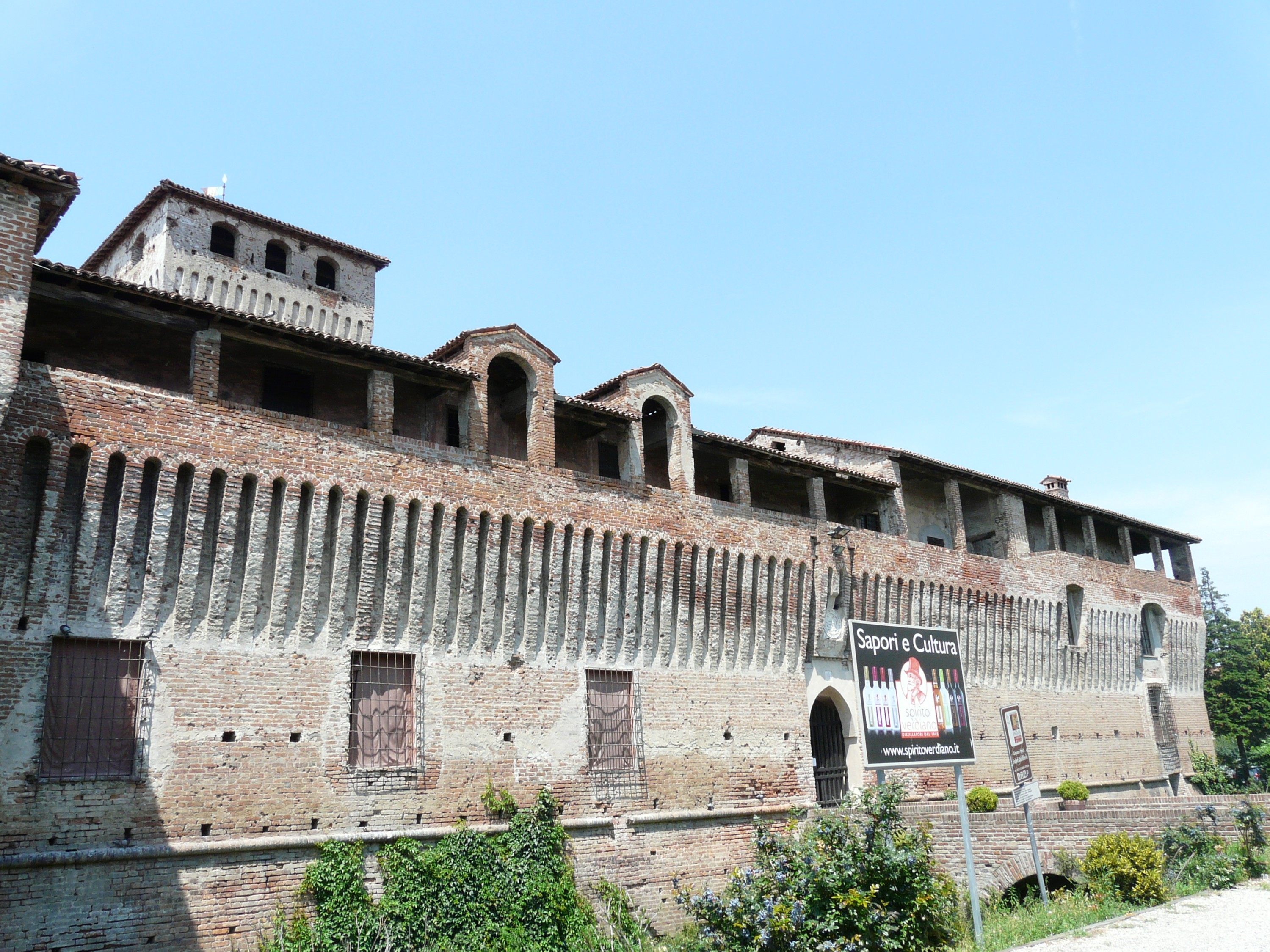
- Rocca dei Rossi.

- Coat of arms

- Location within Italy Location within Emilia-Romagna
- Coordinates: 45°0′N 10°13′E
- Country: Italy
- Region: Emilia-Romagna
- Province: Parma (PR)
- Frazioni: Fontanelle, Fossa, Ragazzola, Rigosa, Stagno

Government
  - Mayor: Alessandro Gattara

Area
  - Total: 40.2 km^{2} (15.5 sq mi)
- Elevation: 32 m (105 ft)

Population (31 December 2015)
  - Total: 3,068
  - Density: 76.3/km^{2} (198/sq mi)
- Demonym: Rocchesi
- Time zone: UTC+1 (CET)
  - Summer (DST): UTC+2 (CEST)
- Postal code: 43010
- Dialing code: 0521
- Website: Official website

Roccabianca (Parmigiano: Rocabiànca) is a comune (municipality) in the Province of Parma in the Italian region Emilia-Romagna, located about 110 kilometres (68 mi) northwest of Bologna and about 25 kilometres (16 mi) northwest of Parma.

Roccabianca borders the following municipalities: Motta Baluffi, Polesine Zibello, San Daniele Po, San Secondo Parmense, Sissa Trecasali, Soragna, and Torricella del Pizzo.

It is home to the Castello di Roccabianca, a castle built by Pier Maria II de' Rossi between 1446 and 1463. It includes frescoes with Stories of Griselda (from Boccaccio's Decameron), by Niccolò da Varallo, as well as astrological scenes.
