= Rocca Sanvitale, Fontanellato =

Medieval fortress in Fontanellato, Parma

Coordinates: 44°52′57″N 10°10′21″E

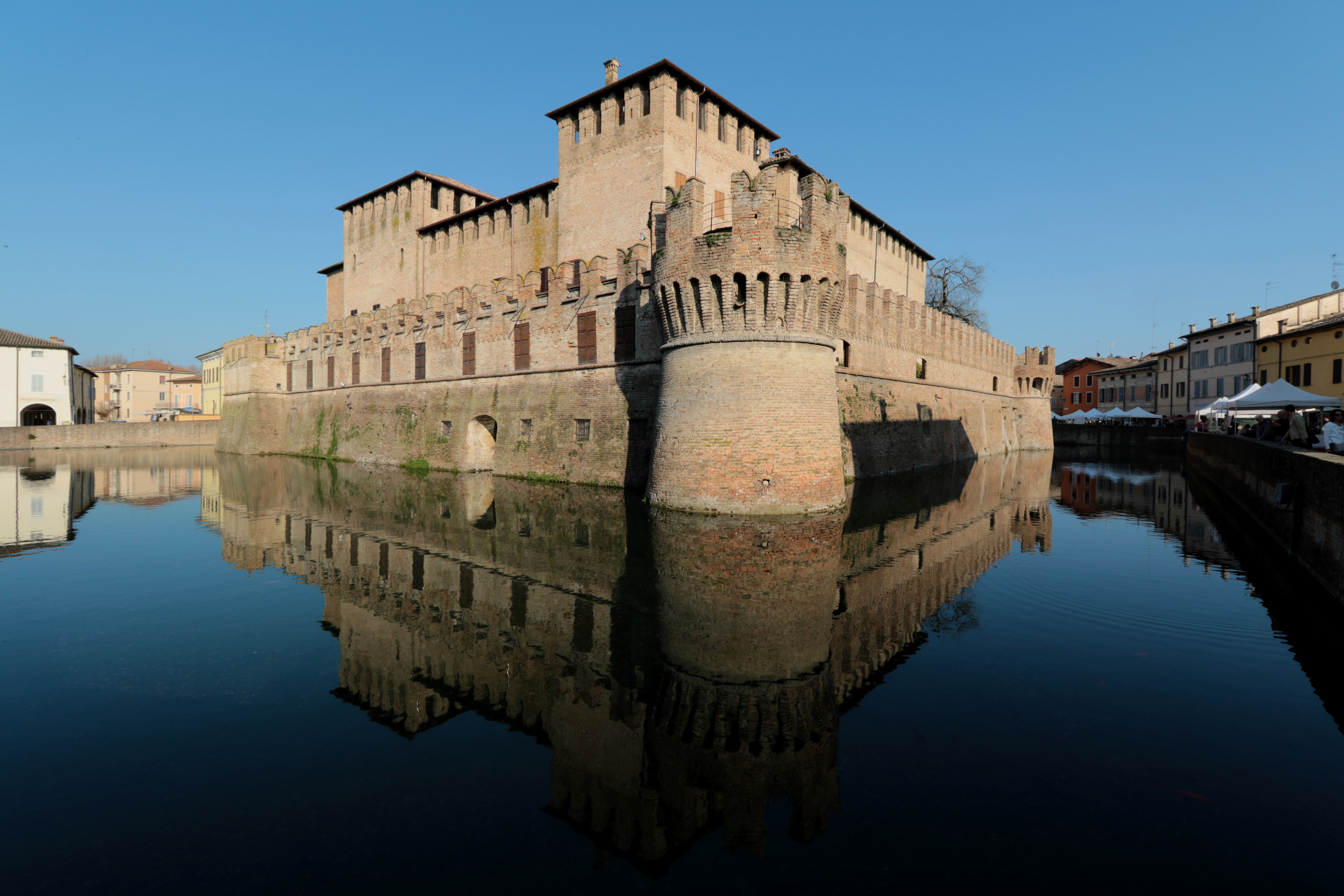
View of the moated castle.

The Rocca Sanvitale, or Sanvitale Castle, is a fortress residence in the centre of the town of Fontanellato, near Parma, northern Italy. Construction of the moated block, accessible through a drawbridge, was begun in the 13th century, mostly completed by the 15th century, with embellishments continuing through to the 18th century. It is prototypical of the urban castle-houses of the turbulent medieval communes of Northern Italy. Until the 1930s it was the home of the descendants of the Count of Sanvitale.

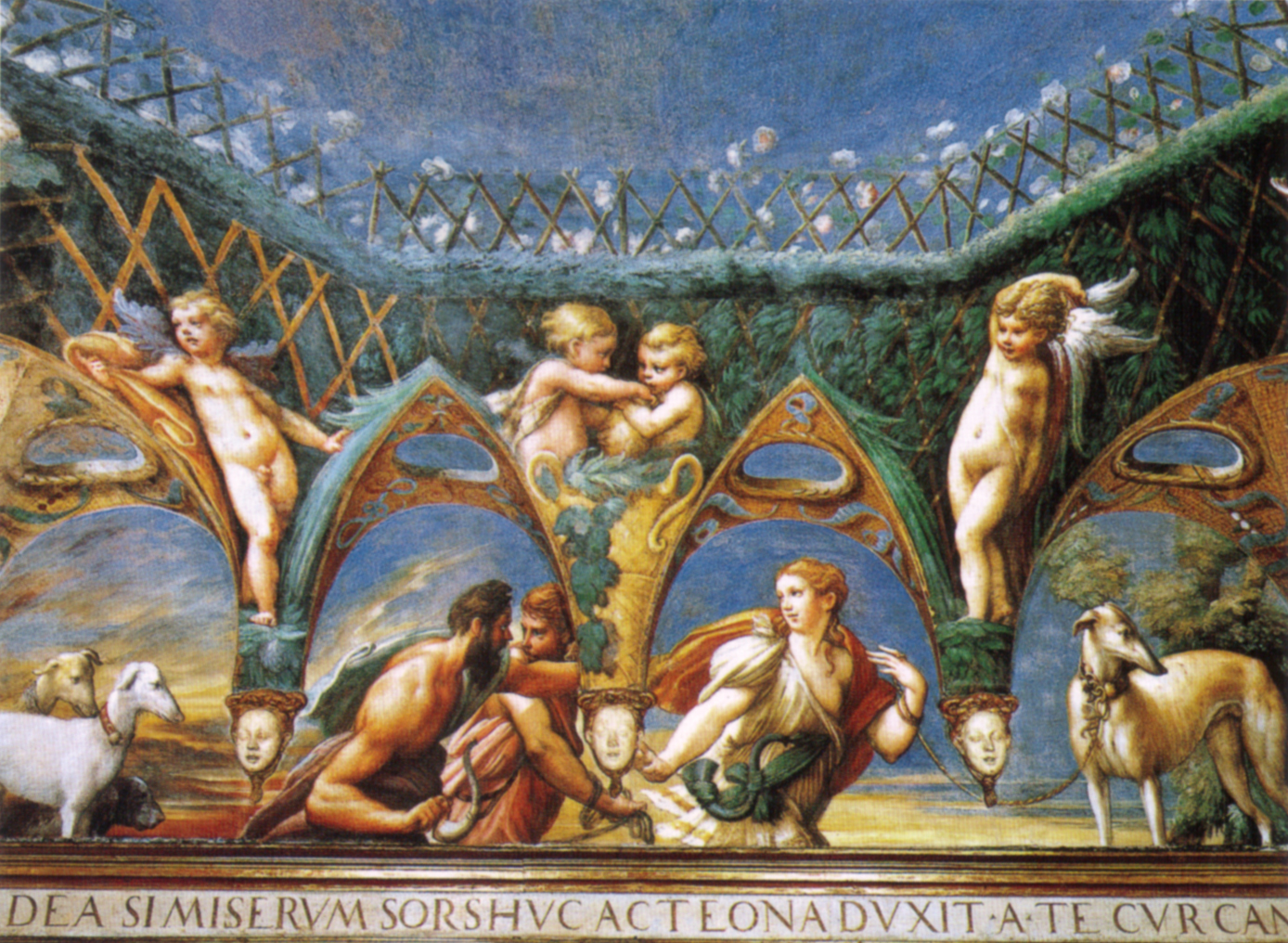
Parmigianino Fresco

The crenelated walls and asymmetric towers are surrounded by an arcaded town. Adjacent to the castle are gardens and a courtyard. The optical chamber (camera ottica) has an optical system that projects to an inside wall a view of the town through mirrors and a prism. Rocca Sanvitale is now partly a museum and partly offices and conference hall for the town administration.

Inside are the frescoes of Diane and Acteon painted in 1523–24 by Parmigianino for the Count Galeazzo Sanvitale and his wife, Paola Gonzaga.

== See also ==
- Castles of the Duchy

== Sources ==
- Guerrieri, Daniela (2006). Castelli del Ducato di Parma e Piacenza. NLF.
