= Trecasali =

- Frazione
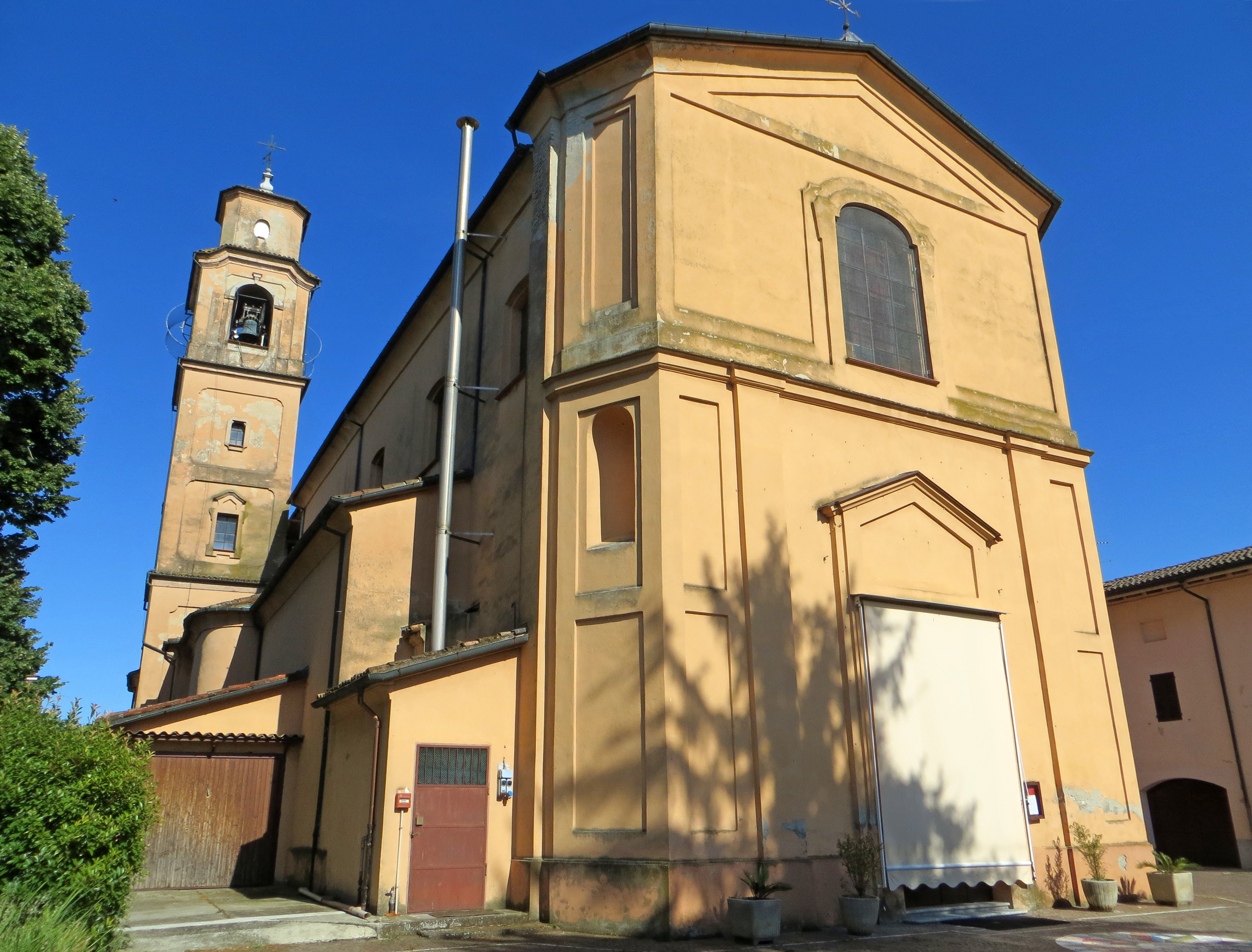
- San Michele

- Location of Trecasali in Italy
- Coordinates: 44°56′N 10°16′E
- Country: Italy
- Region: Emilia-Romagna
- Province: Parma (PR)
- Comune: Sissa Trecasali

Area
  - Total: 29.1 km^{2} (11.2 sq mi)

Population (31 May 2007)
  - Total: 3,413
  - Density: 117/km^{2} (304/sq mi)
- Time zone: UTC+1 (CET)
  - Summer (DST): UTC+2 (CEST)
- Postal code: 43010
- Dialing code: 0521

Trecasali is a frazione of Sissa Trecasali and former comune (municipality) in the Province of Parma in the Italian region Emilia-Romagna, located about 100 kilometres (62 mi) northwest of Bologna and about 15 kilometres (9 mi) northwest of Parma.

The town houses the 18th-century church of San Michele Arcangelo.

== Notable people ==
- Vittorio Casaretti, footballer
