= Sissa Trecasali =

- Comune
- Comune di Sissa Trecasali
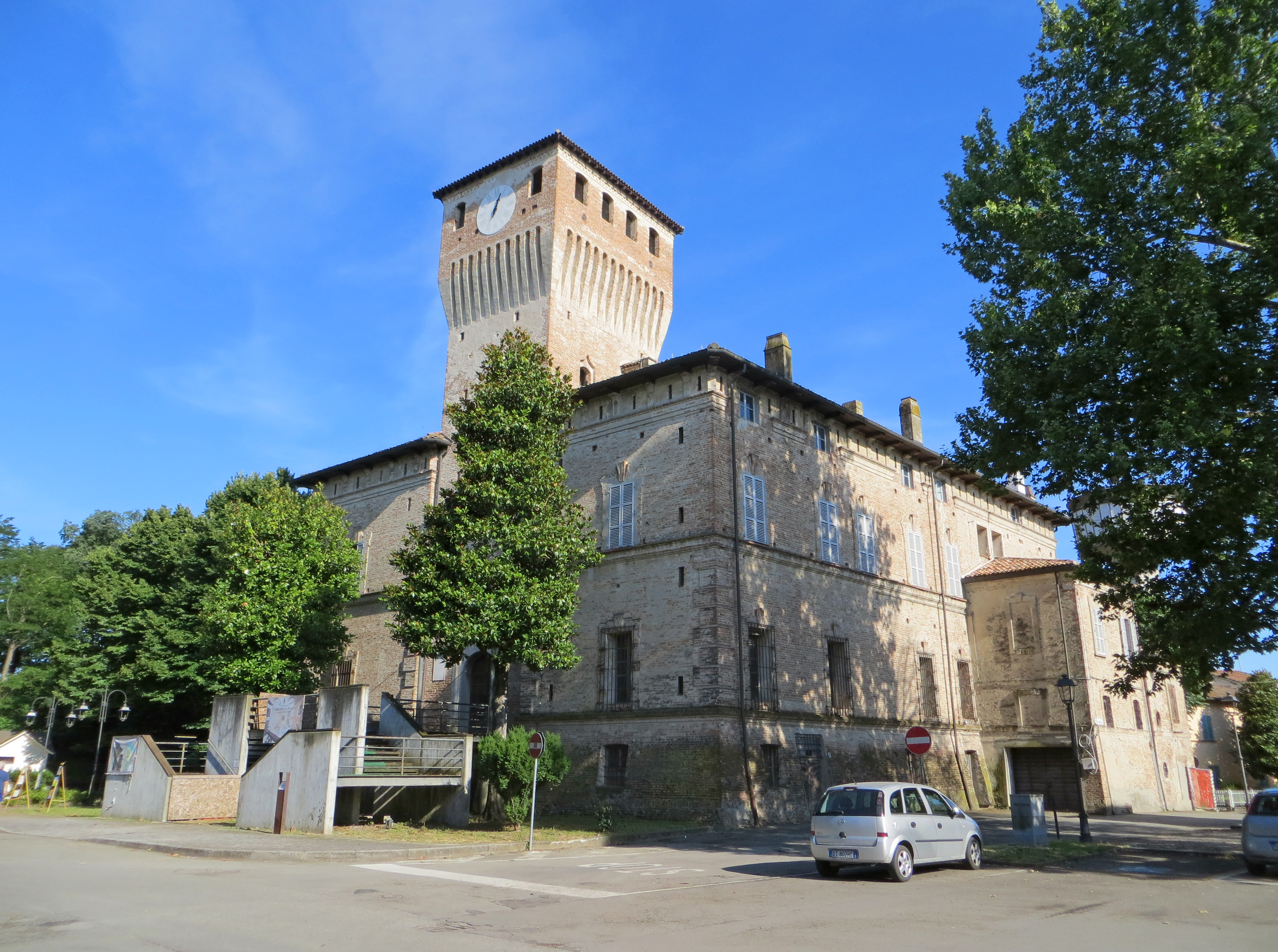
- Castle of Sissa

- Location within Italy Location within Emilia-Romagna
- Coordinates: 44°57′36.72″N 10°15′41.76″E
- Country: Italy
- Region: Emilia-Romagna
- Province: Parma (PR)
- Frazioni: Borgonovo, Casalfoschino, Coltaro, Gramignazzo, Isola Jesus, Palasone, Ronco Campo Canneto, San Nazzaro, San Quirico, Sissa, Sottargine, Torricella, Trecasali, Viarolo

Population (2015)
  - Total: 7 2,000
- Demonym: Sissesi e trecasalesi
- Time zone: UTC+1 (CET)
  - Summer (DST): UTC+2 (CEST)
- Postal code: 43018
- Dialing code: 0521
- Patron saint: Mary, mother of Jesus
- Saint day: 18 September

Sissa Trecasali (Sèsa Tricasè in Parmigiano dialect) is a comune (municipality) in the Province of Parma in the Italian region Emilia-Romagna.

It was formed January 1, 2014 with the merger of municipalities Sissa and Trecasali.
