= Sala Baganza =

- Comune
- Comune di Sala Baganza
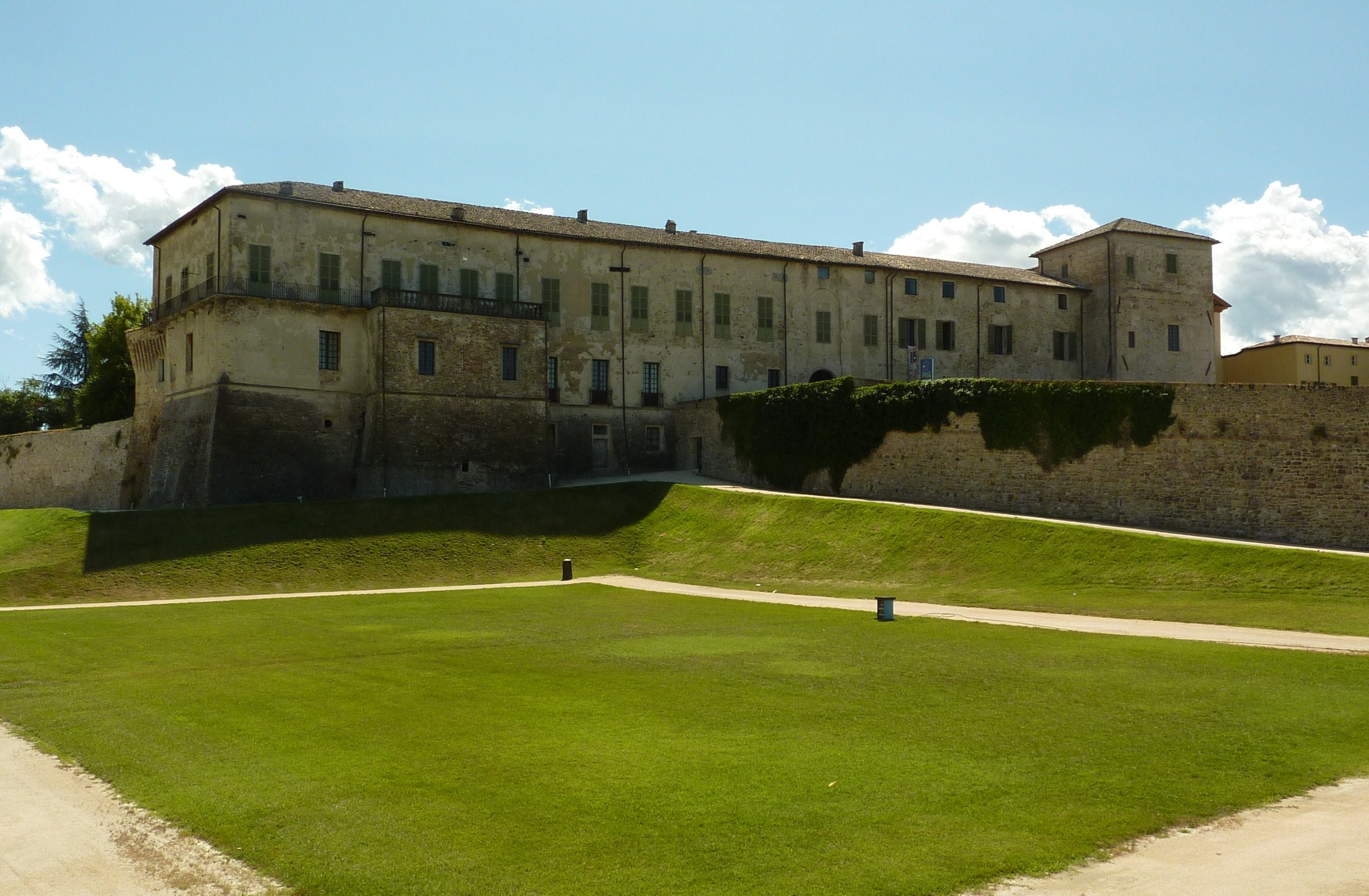
- Rocca Sanvitale.

- Coat of arms

- Location within Italy Location within Emilia-Romagna
- Coordinates: 44°43′N 10°14′E
- Country: Italy
- Region: Emilia-Romagna
- Province: Parma (PR)
- Frazioni: Case Marconi, Casino de' Boschi, Castellaro, Limido, Maiatico, San Vitale Baganza, Talignano

Government
  - Mayor: Aldo Spina

Area
  - Total: 30.76 km^{2} (11.88 sq mi)
- Elevation: 176 m (577 ft)

Population (31 December 2014)
  - Total: 5,558
  - Density: 180.7/km^{2} (468.0/sq mi)
- Demonym: Salesi
- Time zone: UTC+1 (CET)
  - Summer (DST): UTC+2 (CEST)
- Postal code: 43038
- Dialing code: 0521
- Website: Official website

Sala Baganza (Parmigiano: Säla) is a comune (municipality) in the Province of Parma in the Italian region Emilia-Romagna, located about 90 kilometres (56 mi) northwest of Bologna and about 12 kilometres (7 mi) southwest of Parma.

Sala Baganza borders the following municipalities: Calestano, Collecchio, Felino, Fornovo di Taro, Parma, Terenzo.

Some 5 km from town, on the road to Collecchio, is the Pieve di Talignano, a small 12th-century church in Romanesque style. Other sights include:

- Rocca Sanvitale: Former castle/palace of the Sanvitale family, used later by the Duchal rulers of Parma as a hunting lodge and country palace
- Casino dei Boschi, a large 18th-century countryside residence that, among the others, was used by Marie Louise, Duchess of Parma
- Castello di San Vitale Baganza - in a hamlet south of Sala Baganza
- San Vitale: 10th century church near the Castello di San Vitale mentioned above
- Santi Stefano e Lorenzo: Church built 1582-1586, also by the Sanvitale.
