= Orazio Samacchini =

Italian painter (1532–1577)

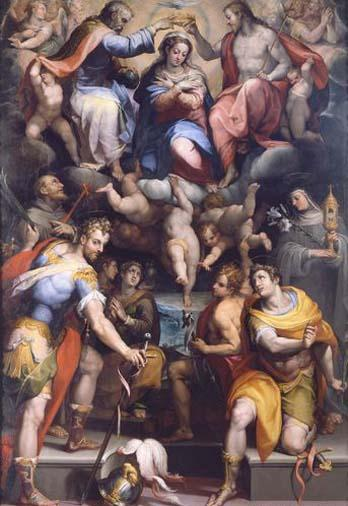
The Virgin Mary and Saints Nabor and Felix, Francis of Assisi, Claire of Assisi, John the Baptist, Mary Magdalene, and Catherine of Alexandria by Orazio Sammachini.

Orazio Samacchini (20 December 1532 – 12 June 1577) was an Italian painter of the late-Renaissance and Mannerist style, active in Rome, Parma, and his native city.

== Biography ==
He was born and died in Bologna. A close friend of Lorenzo Sabbatini, Samacchini traveled to Rome where he participated in 1563 in the decoration of the Vatican Belvedere and of the Sala Regia of Pius IV, along with Taddeo Zuccari and his brother. He returned to Bologna, where he was influenced by Pellegrino Tibaldi. Sammacchini painted for the Palazzo Vitelli a Sant'Egidio, Città di Castello, San Giacomo Maggiore, the church of Corpus Domini in Bologna, and Santa Maria Maggiore (Santa Maria Della Vita?) in Bologna. He painted frescoes of Virtues, Prophets, and Angels in Sant'Abbondio, Cremona.

Instructions for how to paint (1570) in the Cathedral of Parma are collected in Gualandi's Memorie.
