= Pier Maria II de' Rossi =

Italian condottiere and count of San Secondo

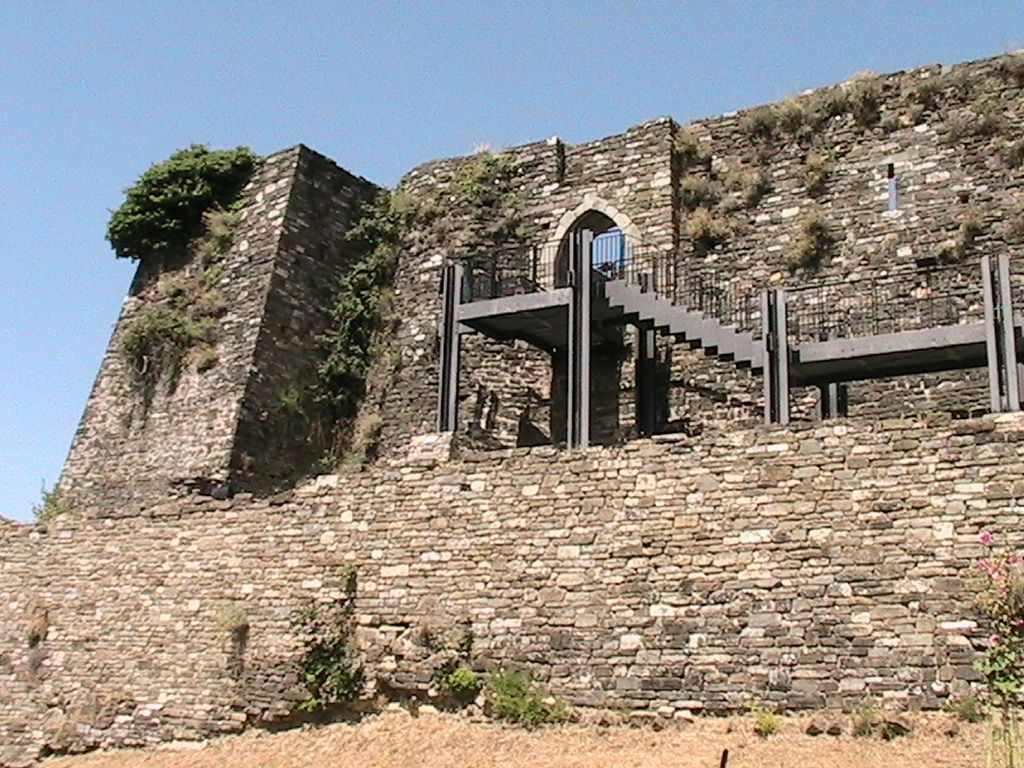
Remains of the Castle of Berceto

Pier Maria Rossi or Pier Maria II de' Rossi (25 March 1413 – 1 September 1482) was an Italian condottiere and count of a region around present-day San Secondo Parmense. His properties included the castle of Rocca dei Rossi. He was known as "the Magnificent".

== Biography ==
He was born at Berceto, the son of Pier Maria I de' Rossi and Maria Giovanna Cavalcabò. Aged 15, he married Antonia, daughter of Guido Torelli. In the service of Filippo Maria Visconti, duke of Milan, he fought five times against the Republic of Venice. He succeeded as titular head of the Rossi family's fiefs in 1438.

When Visconti died in 1447, Pier Maria sided with Francesco Sforza, moving his lands in the regions of Parma and Piacenza under Milanese suzerainty. In 1448 he defeated the Venetians in a river battle on the Po at Casalmaggiore. In 1471 he was sent by Sforza as ambassador to the court of Pope Sixtus IV in Rome. After the death of Duke Francesco Sforza, Pier Maria Rossi was one of the triumvirate who in fact governed the duchy on behalf of the then underage Gian Galeazzo Sforza. However, when the latter was ousted by his uncle, Ludovico Sforza, the fortunes of the Rossi family started to crumble. In 1482, an alliance of Milanese troops with those of the rival Sanvitale, Pallavicino and Da Correggio families, led by Gian Giacomo Trivulzio, besieged the Rocca dei Rossi at San Secondo. Pier Maria resisted gallantly but, after the Milanese started to storm all his other fortresses, surrendered and retired to the castle of Torrechiara, which he had built for his long-time great love, Bianca Pellegrini. He died there in 1482.

== Children ==
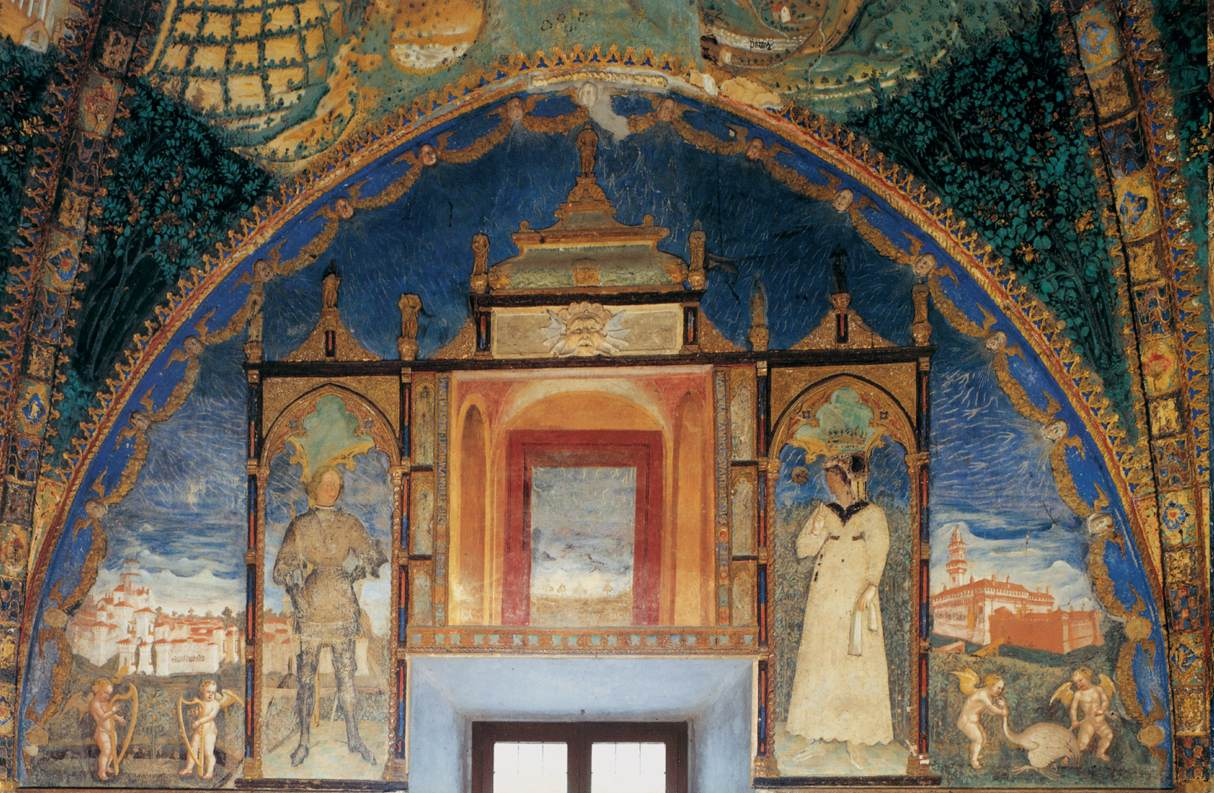
Pier Maria and Bianca, painted by Benedetto Bembo

Pier Maria and Antonia had nine children:

- Giovanni de' Rossi (1431-1502) eldest son, disinherited by his father,
- Roberto (? -1541)
- Donella (1435 - post 1483) married to Giberto III Sanvitale
- Giacomo, (1436 - post 1483) leader
- Guido de' Rossi (about 1440 -1490), leader and his successor
- Ugolino (1447-1498), religious, canon of the Chapter of the Cathedral of Parma
- Bernardo (1432-1468), bishop of Cremona and Novara
- Eleonora
- Maria Bianca

He also had two biological children:

- Bertrando (1429 - 1502), count of Berceto
- Orlando (with Bianca Pelligrini).

== Sources ==
- Pellegri, Marco (1996). Un feudatario sotto l'insegna del leone rampante. Pier Maria Rossi 1413-1482. Parma: Silva Editore.
