= San Secondo Parmense =

- Comune
- Comune di San Secondo Parmense
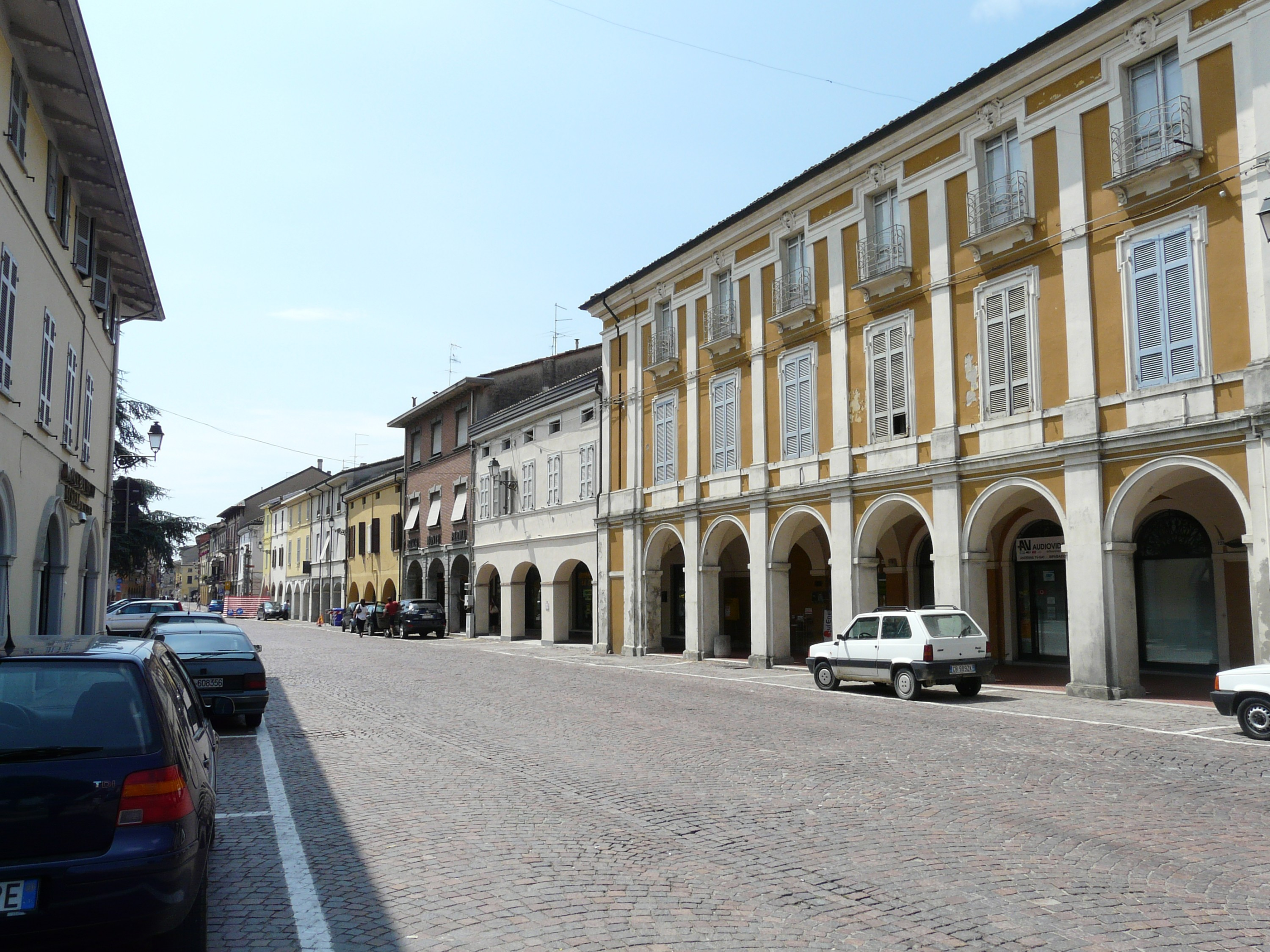
- View of San Secondo historical centre.

- Coat of arms

- Location within Italy Location within Emilia-Romagna
- Coordinates: 44°55′N 10°14′E
- Country: Italy
- Region: Emilia-Romagna
- Province: Parma (PR)
- Frazioni: Case Pizzo, Castell'Aicardi, Copezzato, Corticelli, Martorano, Pavarara, Ronchetti, Valle, Villa Baroni

Government
  - Mayor: Giulia Zucchi

Area
  - Total: 38.2 km^{2} (14.7 sq mi)

Population (30 June 2016)
  - Total: 5,718
  - Density: 150/km^{2} (388/sq mi)
- Demonym: Sansecondini (dialect: Sgunden)
- Time zone: UTC+1 (CET)
  - Summer (DST): UTC+2 (CEST)
- Postal code: 43017
- Dialing code: 0521
- Patron saint: Blessed Virgin
- Saint day: 25 March
- Website: Official website

San Secondo Parmense (Sansecondino: San Sgond or Sasgon; Parmigiano: San Zgónd) is a comune (municipality) in the Province of Parma in the Italian region Emilia-Romagna, located about 200 kilometres (120 mi) northwest of Bologna and about 15 kilometres (9 mi) northwest of Parma.

San Secondo Parmense borders the following municipalities: Fontanellato, Roccabianca, Sissa Trecasali, Soragna.

The main sights are the Rocca dei Rossi castle and a Romanesque rural church, the Pieve di San Genesio, first documented in the 11th century.
