= Giocondo Pio Lorgna =

Venerable Giocondo Pio Lorgna OP
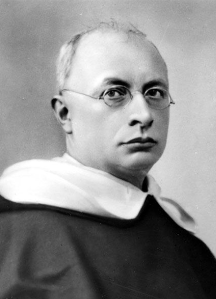
- Born: 27 September 1870; Popetto di Tresana, Massa Carrara, Kingdom of Italy
- Died: 8 July 1928 (aged 57); Venice, Kingdom of Italy
- Resting place: Ss. Giovanni e Paolo, Venice, Italy

Giocondo Pio Lorgna (27 September 1870 – 8 July 1928), born Giocondo Lorgna, was an Italian Roman Catholic priest who was also a professed member of the Order of Preachers. Lorgna served as a parish priest in Venice in the church of Ss. Giovanni e Paolo and was either a benefactor or revitalizer of Christian movements or congregations established across Venice.

Lorgna had a strong devotion to Blessed Imelda Lambertini and so established a religious congregation in her honor and named it the Dominican Sisters of Blessed Imelda; it was a congregation that was open to females wishing to pursue the Dominican charism and the spread of pastoral activities.

On 15 March 2008 he was deemed to be Venerable after Pope Benedict XVI acknowledged the fact that Lorgna had lived a life of heroic virtue.

== Life ==
Giocondo Lorgna was born on 27 September 1870 in Massa Carrara to Giovanni Lorgna and Maria Fiasella. As a child his mother assumed control of his religious education and taught him about the life and works of Jesus Christ; this influenced Lorgna and the latter learnt to give alms to the poor whenever he came across them.

Lorgna was known to be an intelligent and curious child. On one occasion a priest asked him: "Who do you love more: your father or mother?" Lorgna replied: "First of all I love Jesus who was crucified for me; then my parents". At the age of ten – in 1880 – he moved to the home of his priest uncle Luigi Lorgna in Torrile in Parma; he later announced to his uncle he wanted to become a priest and so commenced his studies for the priesthood at the age of thirteen in 1883. While there he met and was close with the rector and future cardinal Blessed Andrea Carlo Ferrari whom he looked up to as a role model. While on vacations he would return to his uncle's home and devoted his time to teaching catechism to children and aiding the sick. At the age of seventeen in 1887 he led a pilgrimage in his home parish to a Marian shrine in Parma.

During his time undergoing philosophical studies he listened to the preaching of the Dominican Father Doria and he began to learn about the teachings of Saint Thomas Aquinas. He considered becoming a Dominican priest at the age of nineteen in 1889 and after a period of reflection consulted with Ferrari and the vice-chancellor Saint Guido Maria Conforti; his uncle was in tow when he announced to them: "I'll be a Dominican!" In Bologna – at the tomb of Saint Dominic – he donned the habit of the Dominicans on 8 November 1889 and left for his novitiate in Ortonovo. There he made his first vows and began his theological studies in Bologna and graduated in Sacred Scripture. He was ordained to the priesthood on 22 December 1893. When he was professed as a Dominican he assumed the name of "Pio".

After his ordination he was tasked with teaching at a Dominican-run school in Bologna; at this point fellow priests – even the older ones – sought him out for spiritual direction and for confession. On an annual basis he would go to Fontanellato to hear the confessions of parishioners and in August 1903 obtained from Pope Pius X the elevation to the status of "basilica" of the Fontanellato Marian church. Lorgna was also the vice-curate of that shrine. In January 1905 he was appointed as the pastor of Ss. Giovanni e Paolo in Venice; he expressed doubts about his abilities to look after the souls of the people and consulted with Ferrari who said: "Go, my son, your fishery will be prodigious!" He entered the new parish on the following 2 February and placed his pastoral mission under the protection of the Blessed Virgin Mary.

During World War I he reorganized Caritas in his parish for the benefit of the poor and attempted to adhere to the social doctrine of the Church in an effort to cater to the needs of the people during the conflict. To do this he looked to the example of the social work of Pius X and Pope Benedict XV as well as to the Patriarch of Venice Cardinal Pietro La Fontaine as a role model. Lorgna also founded a spiritual group under the name of Adoratori del Ss. Sacramentao and also was the founder of the Asilo degli Angeli Custodi and of the Orfantrofio del Rosario for Orphan Children. In addition he was the co-founder of the Patronato Divina Provvidenza. He introduced the Pia Unione Missionaria and Catholic Action into his parish.

Lorgna's devotion to Blessed Imelda Lambertini allowed him to establish a female branch of the Dominicans and founded in 1922; the first members were clothed in the Dominican habit on 20 October 1922. In 1926 he went to Spain and on the return home travelled to Lourdes in France as a pilgrim.

In 1928 he discovered that he had stomach cancer and he at once kissed a crucifix after learning this. He died at sunset on 8 July 1928 in a Venetian hospital looking at a statue of the Blessed Virgin Mary saying: "Mother, Mother, assist me". His remains were buried in the cemetery of San Michele but were transferred on 2 October 1939 and now lie in Ss. Giovanni e Paolo.

Lorgna's order expanded across Italian cities well into Europe in Albania and has also expanded in Cameroon and the Philippines.

== Beatification process ==
The beatification process commenced on 21 April 1950 – under Pope Pius XII – in a diocesan process that would gather documentation on his life and assess how he expressed the cardinal and theological virtues; the process also gave him the title of Servant of God and it concluded its work in 1955. It was not until 1993 – decades later – that the Congregation for the Causes of Saints validated the process in 1993 and opened the "Roman Phase" for their own line of investigation to begin. The Positio was sent to Rome for investigation in 1993.

More than a decade later – on 15 March 2008 – Pope Benedict XVI declared Lorgna to be Venerable after he approved the findings that the late priest had indeed exercised a life of heroic virtue to a favorable degree.

The miracle required for his beatification was investigated in the diocese of its origin and received validation from officials in Rome in 2006. The medical board based there assessed the healing and all documents that came with it on 26 June 2008 and approved the healing as being a legitimate miracle.

The current postulator assigned to the cause is the Dominican Francesco Maria Ricci.
