= FMR Magazine =

FMR is a luxury art magazine that was initially created by Franco Maria Ricci, an Italian publisher and polymath. It was published from 1982 to 2009, and restarted in 2021. Jacqueline Kennedy called it "the most beautiful magazine in the world".

FMR ostensibly stands for the initials of the publisher's name. When pronounced aloud, it also sounds like éphémère, a French word with rich connotations that may translate as "fleeting" or "transitory".

== History ==
FMR first appeared in 1982 in Italian, and in 1984 in English. In December 2002, after twenty years from the release of the first issue, Ricci sold the magazine to Marilena Ferrari's company Art'é to focus on his old ambition to build the largest maze in the world, "Labarinto della Masone", in Fontanellato. In 2003 art critic and curator Flaminio Gualdoni replaced Ricci as editor of the magazine. In 2007 FMR was augmented by FMR White, a sister publication devoted to contemporary art. Over the years the two publications featured many notable contributors, including Alberto Arbasino, Peter Bloch, Jorge Luis Borges, Italo Calvino, Umberto Eco, Giovanni Mariotti, Octavio Paz, Nicola Spinosa, and Giovanni Testori. Both FMR and FMR White ceased publication in 2009.

In 2015, after completing the seven-hectares wide maze also featuring an art museum and a library, Ricci bought back the copyrights of FMR with the potential intent to resume publication. Following Ricci's death in September 2020, the project was taken up by his widow Laura Casalis. A "Numero Zero" was produced in late 2021, and the first full issue was published in March 2022.

== Reception ==
FMR elicited many high-profile admirers, including director Federico Fellini who used to call it the "black pearl"
