= Obelisk of Theodosius =

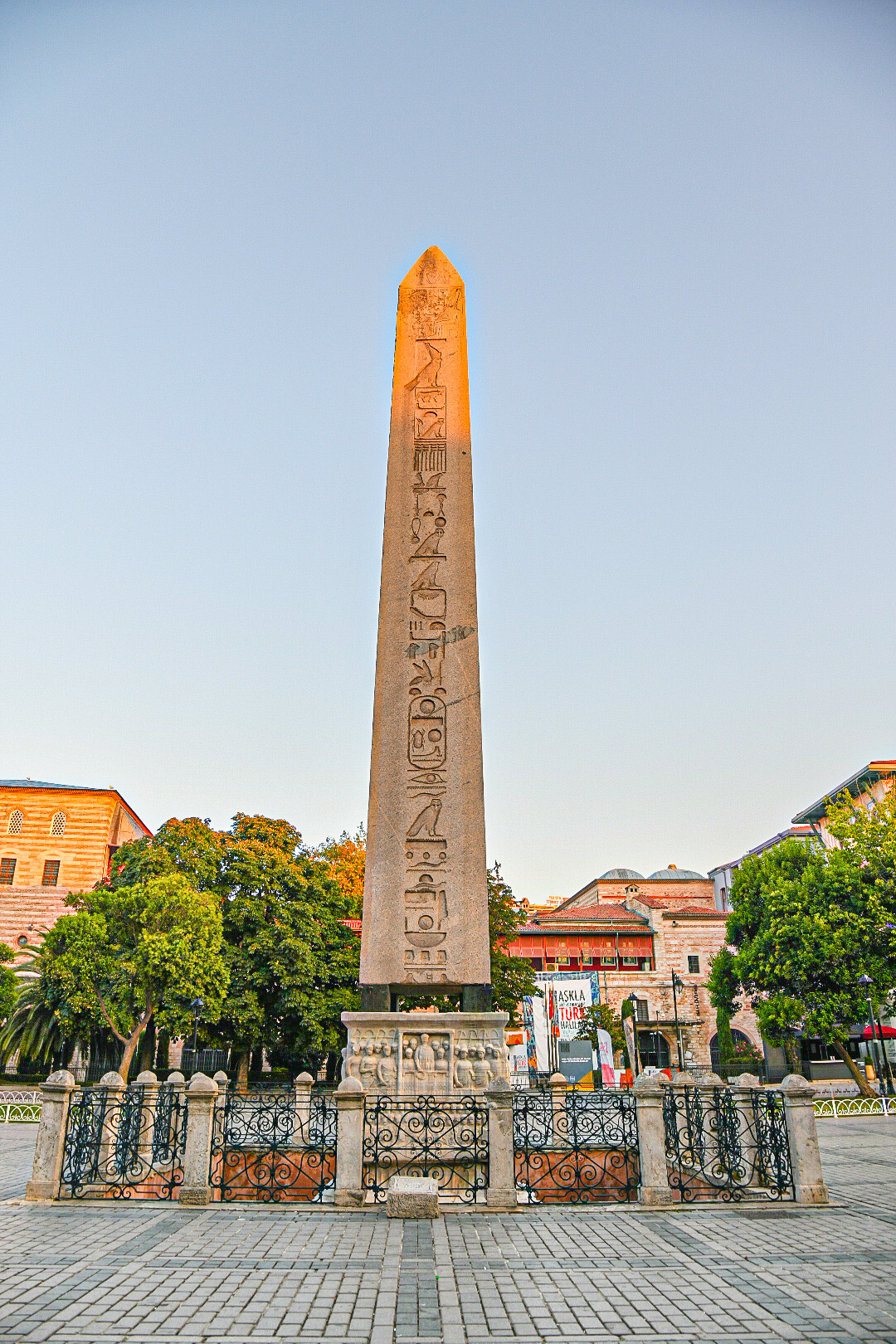
- The obelisk in 2024

- Location in Istanbul, Turkey

General information
- Location: Istanbul, Turkey
- Coordinates: 41°00′21.24″N 28°58′31.43″E
- Completed: c. 1450 BC

Height
- Height: c. 21 meters (original); 25.6 metres (84 ft)

Technical details
- Material: Granite

The Obelisk of Theodosius (Latin: Obeliscus Theodosii; Greek: Οβελίσκος του Θεοδόσιου Α΄, Turkish: Dikilitaş) is the Ancient Egyptian obelisk of Pharaoh Thutmose III, first erected around 1450 BC. It was re-erected in the Hippodrome of Constantinople (known today as At Meydanı or Sultanahmet Meydanı, in the modern city of Istanbul, Turkey) by the Roman emperor Theodosius I in 390.

== History ==
The obelisk was first erected during the 18th dynasty by Pharaoh Thutmose III (1479–1425 BC) to the south of the seventh pylon of the great temple of Karnak. The Roman emperor Constantius II (337–361 AD) had it and another obelisk transported along the Nile River to Alexandria to commemorate his ventennalia or 20 years on the throne in 357. The other obelisk was erected on the spina of the Circus Maximus in Rome in the autumn of that year, and is now known as the Lateran Obelisk. The obelisk that would become the obelisk of Theodosius remained in Alexandria until 390; when Theodosius I (379–395 AD) had it transported to Constantinople and put up on the spina of the Hippodrome there. It remained in place through the Byzantine period and survived the 17th-century demolition of the Hippodrome under the Ottoman Empire. In the 18th century, Mary Montagu visited the obelisk and enclosed a copy of its Latin inscription, along with a somewhat inaccurate description of the pedestal, in a letter to a friend.

== Description ==
=== Obelisk ===
The Obelisk of Theodosius is made of red granite from Aswan and was originally around 30 meters tall, like the Lateran Obelisk. The lower part was damaged in antiquity, probably during its transport or re-erection, and so the obelisk is today only 18.54 meters (or 19.6 meters) high, or 25.6 meters if the base is included. Between the four corners of the obelisk and the pedestal are four bronze cubes, used in its transportation and re-erection.

Each of its four faces has a single central column of inscription, celebrating Thutmose III's victory over the Mitanni which took place on the banks of the Euphrates River around 1450 BC.

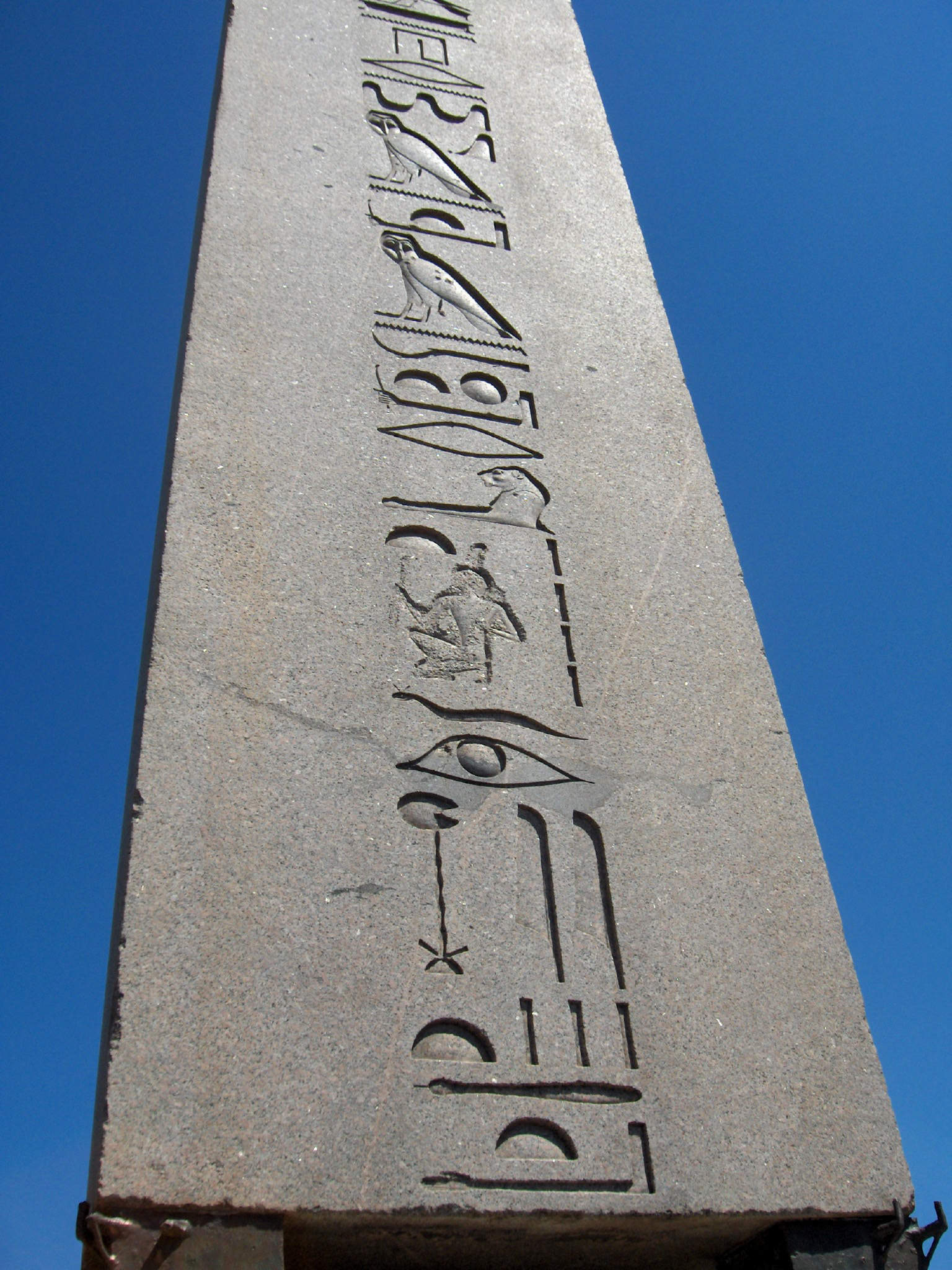
Bottom of the inscription (south face)

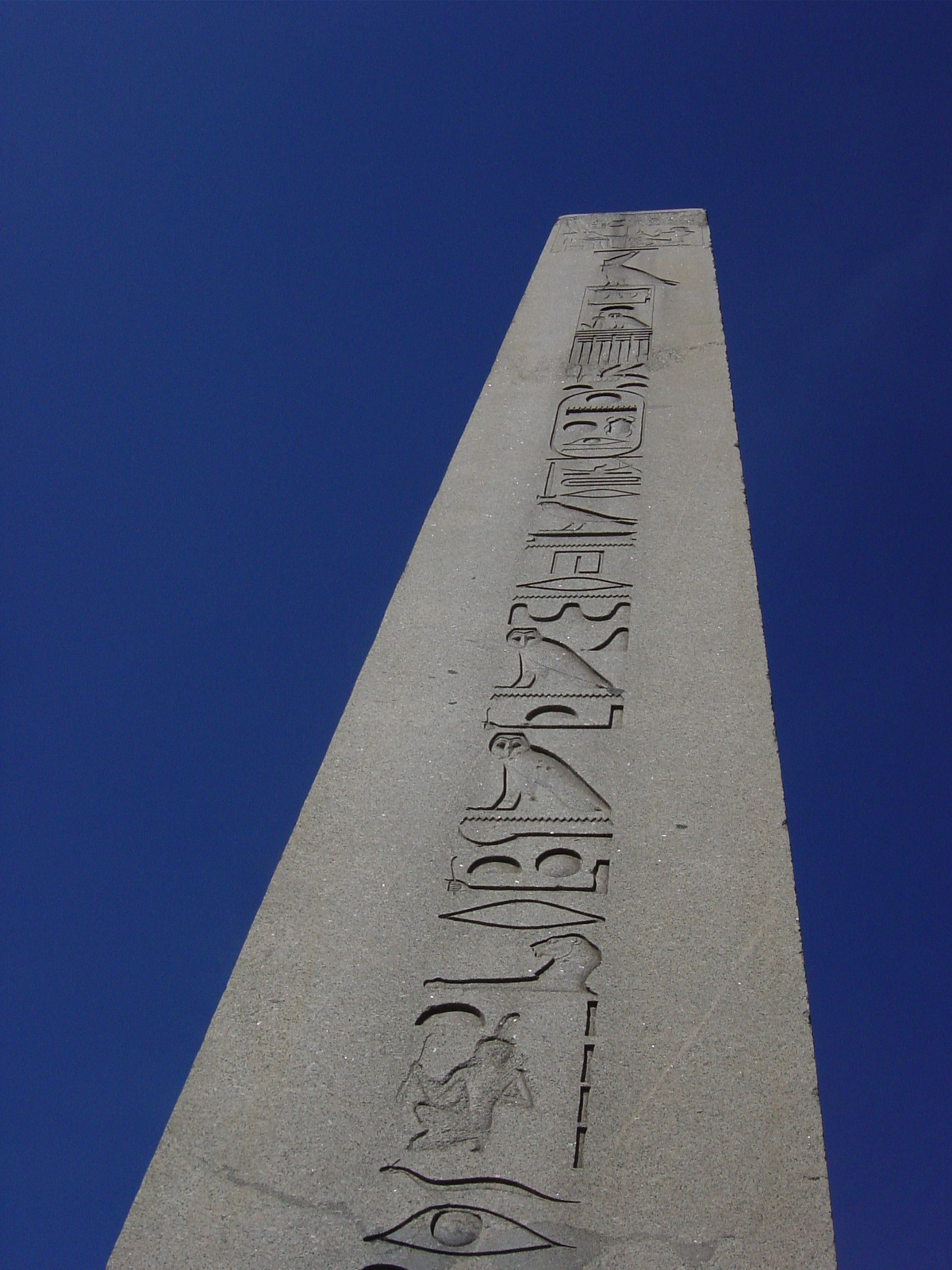
Top of the inscription (south face)

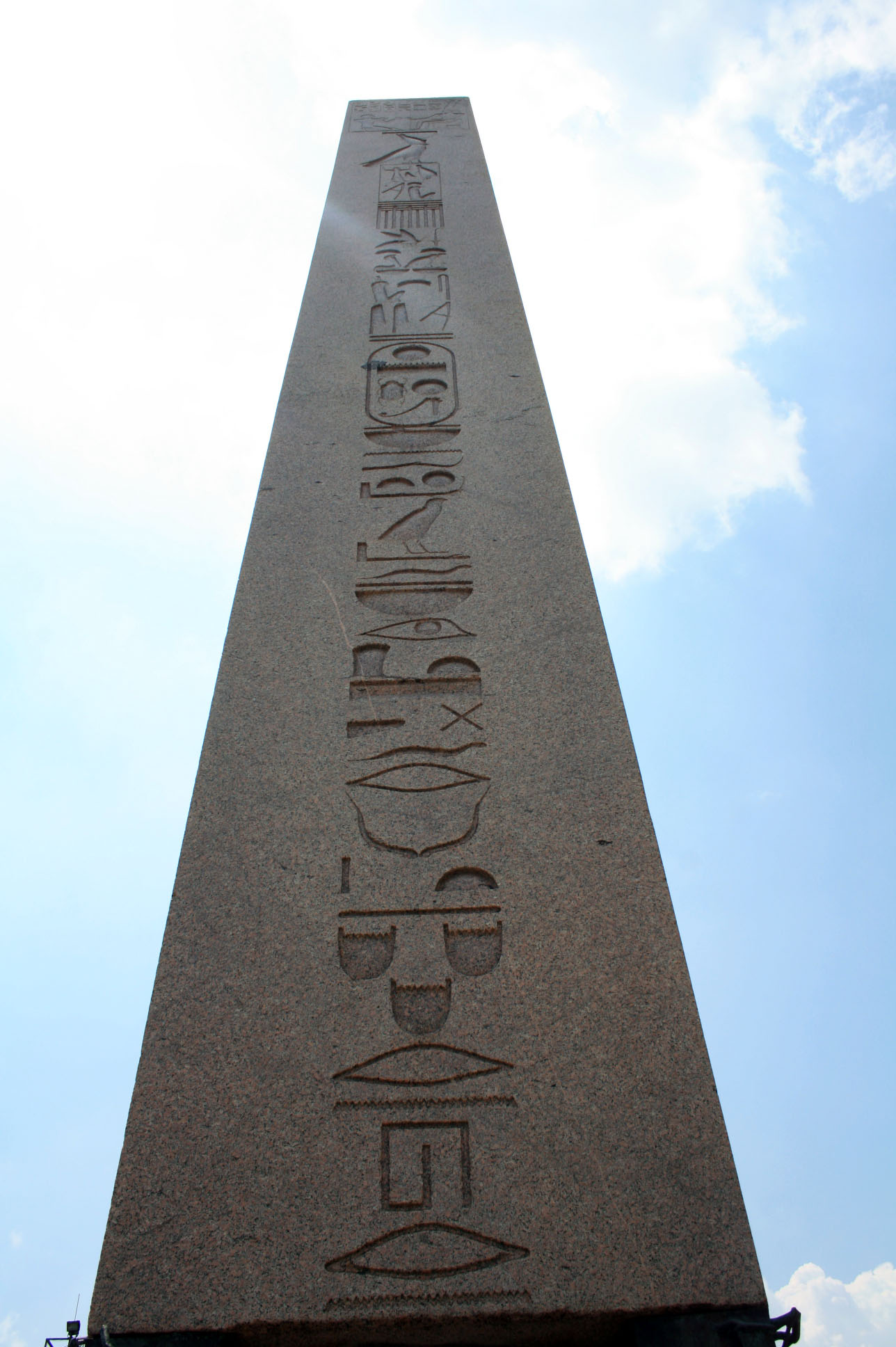

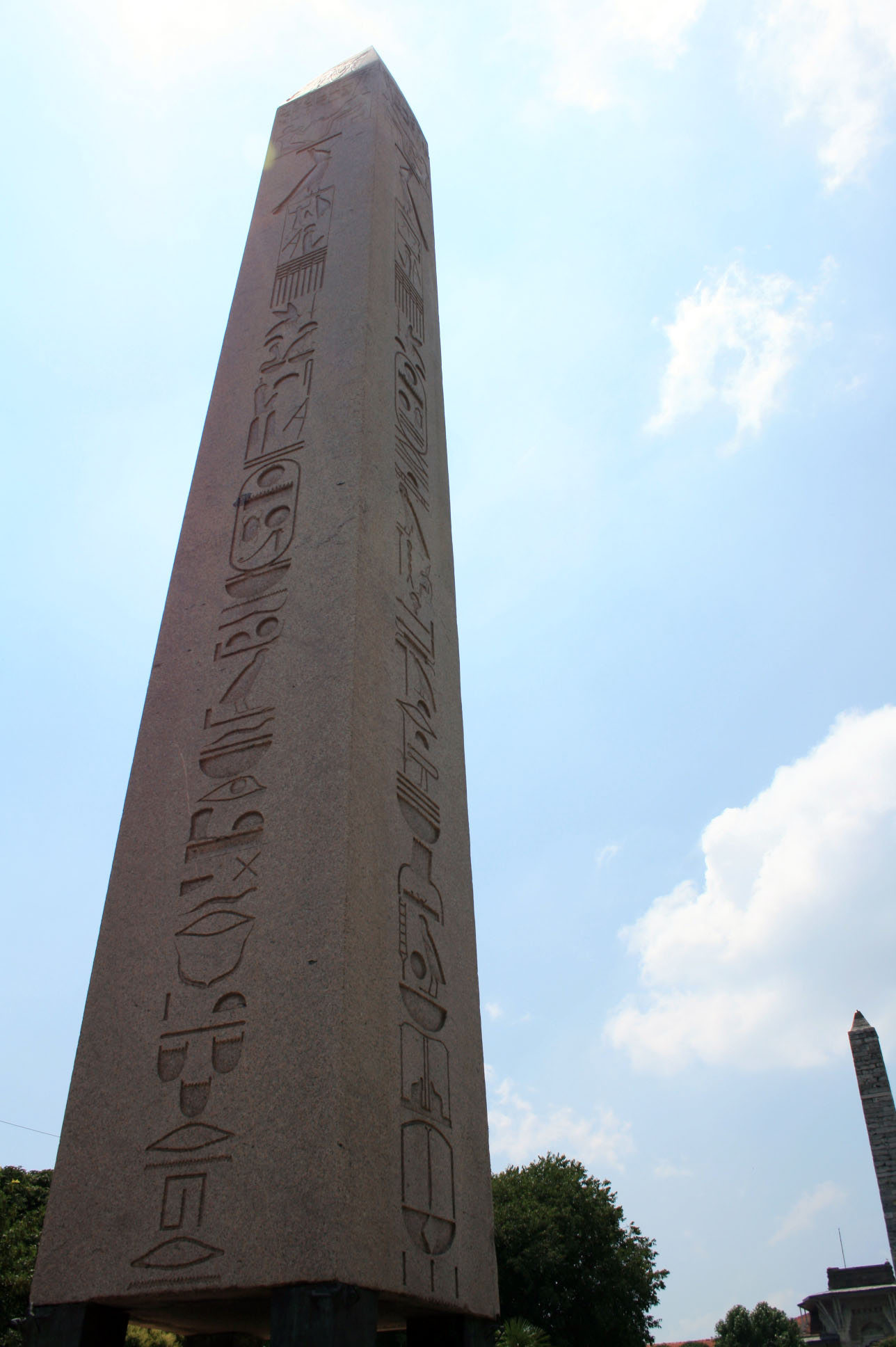

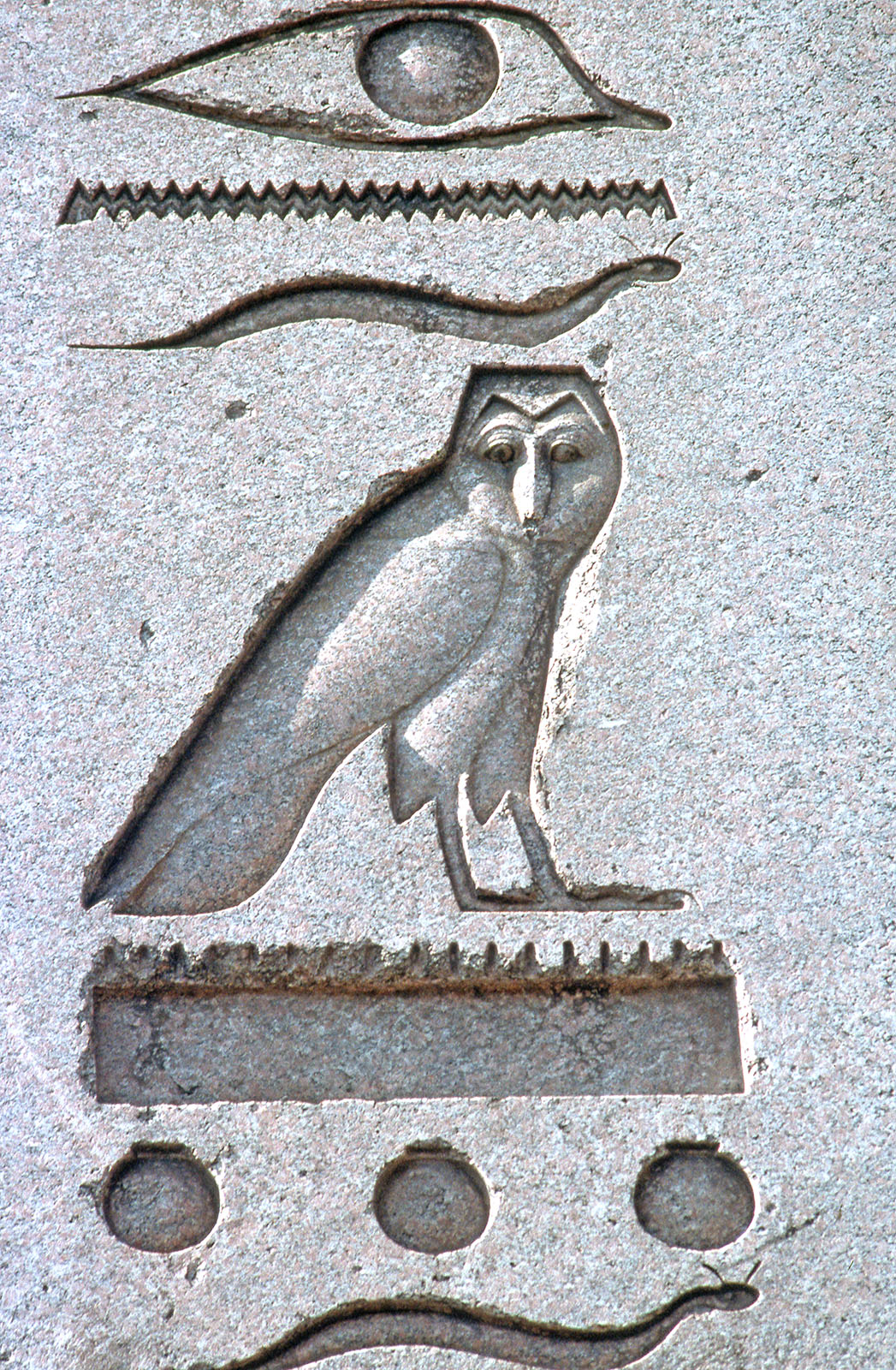
Obelisk of Theodosius Hieropglyphs

=== Pedestal ===
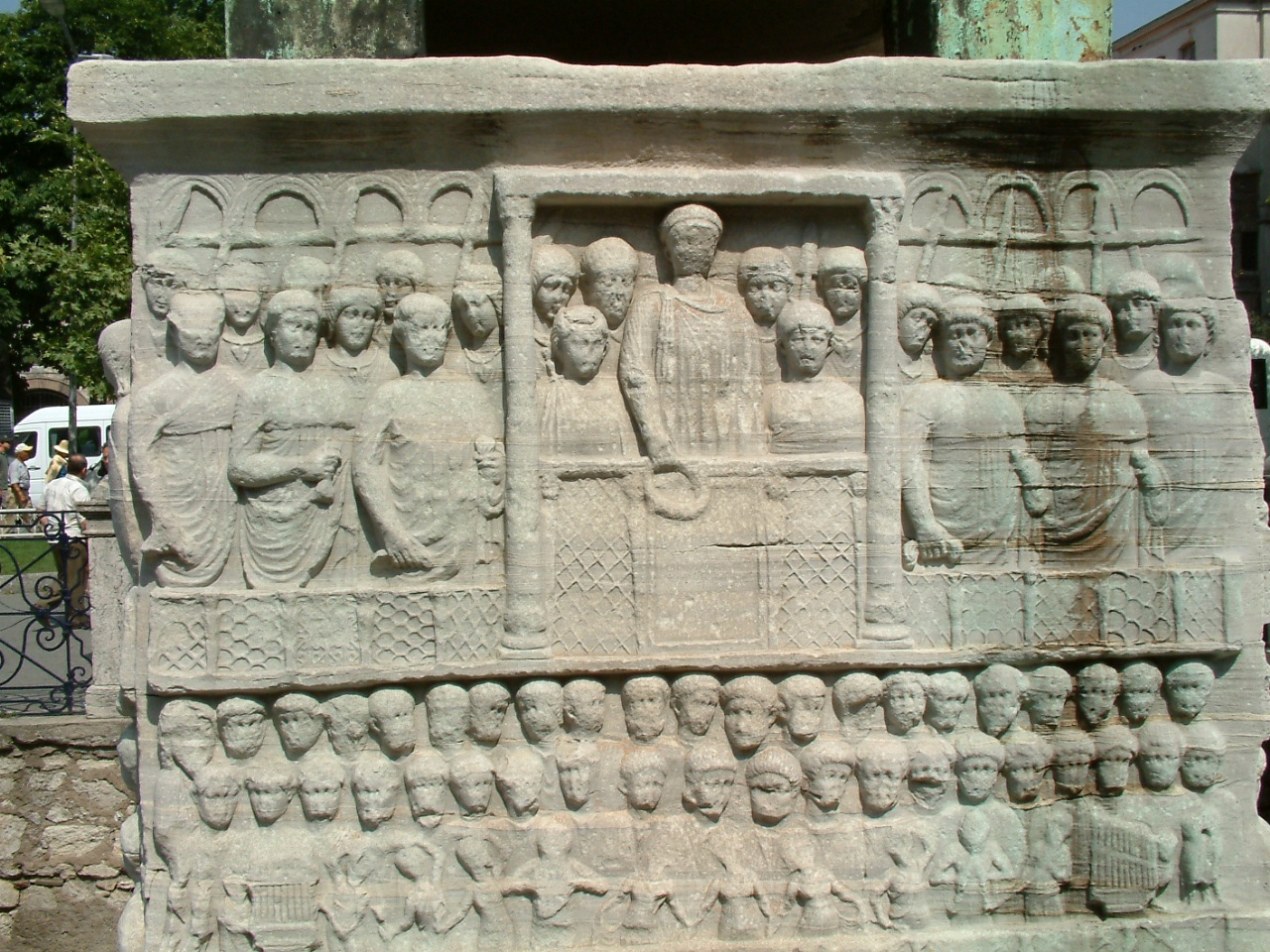
Detail of the pedestal: Theodosius I offers laurels of victory; the water organ of Ctesibius is in the lower right-hand corner

The marble pedestal has bas-reliefs dating to the time of the obelisk's re-erection in Constantinople. Each shows a spectacle in the Hippodrome, being observed from the imperial box by Theodosius I and members of his court; rows of guards, noblemen, and common spectators border the box. The north face of the pedestal depicts the erection of the obelisk itself, the west depicts kneeling barbarians offering tribute to the emperor, the south depicts a chariot race, and the east depicts music and dancing. On this latter face Theodosius I offers the crown of victory to the winner in the chariot races, framed between arches and Corinthian columns, with happy spectators, musicians and dancers assisting in the ceremony. In the bottom right is the water organ of Ctesibius and on the left another instrument.

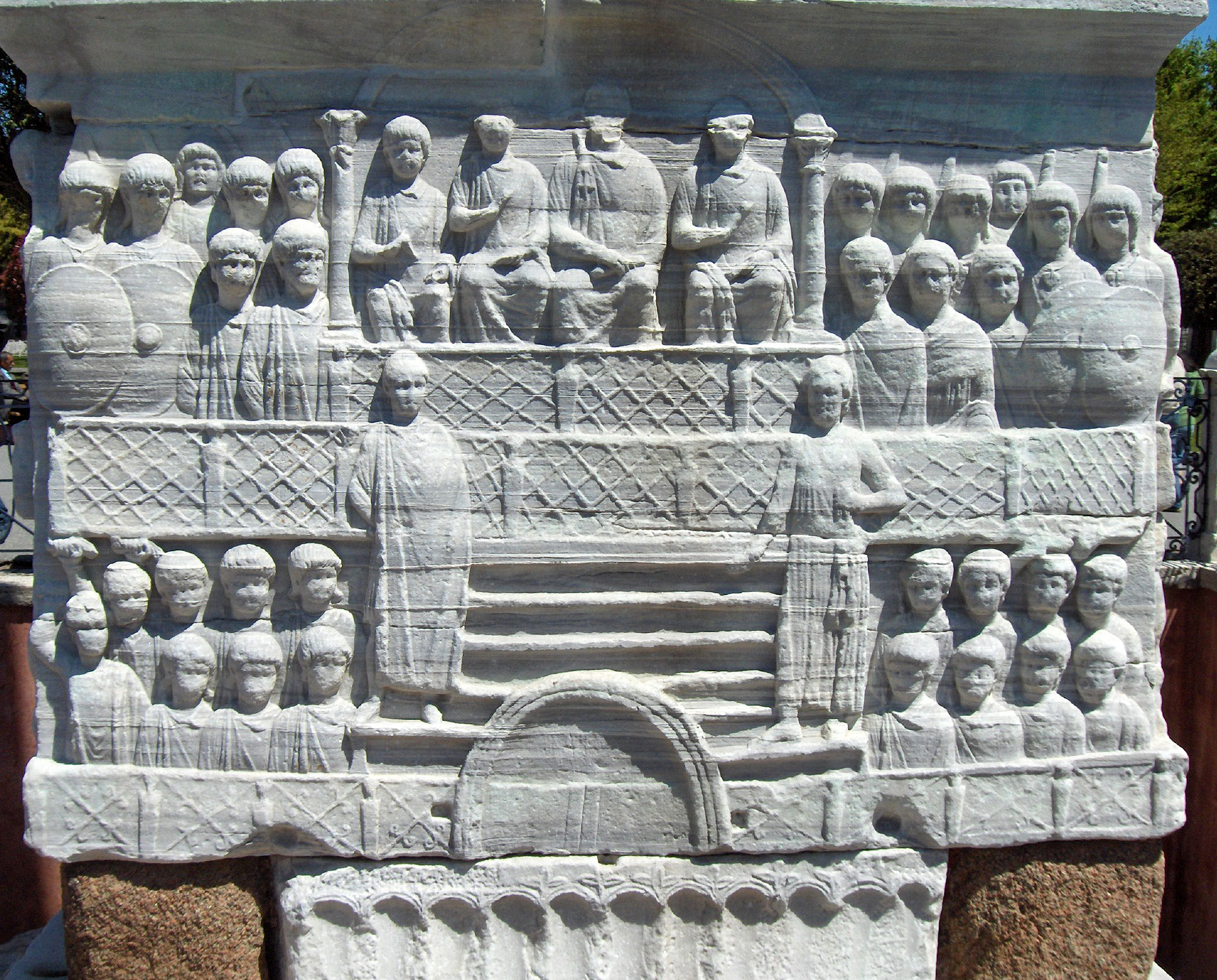
The emperor and his court (south face)

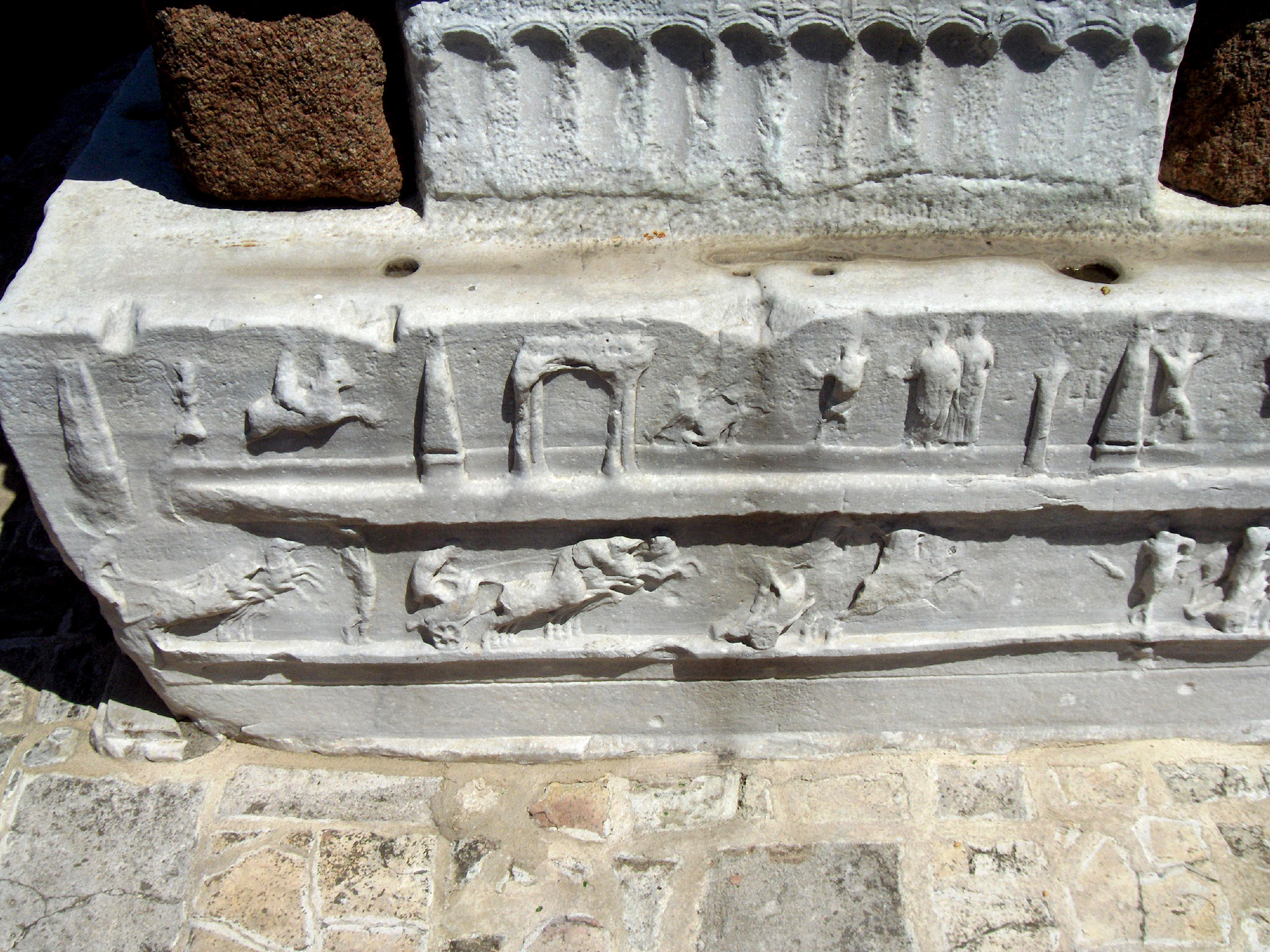
The chariot race (south face)

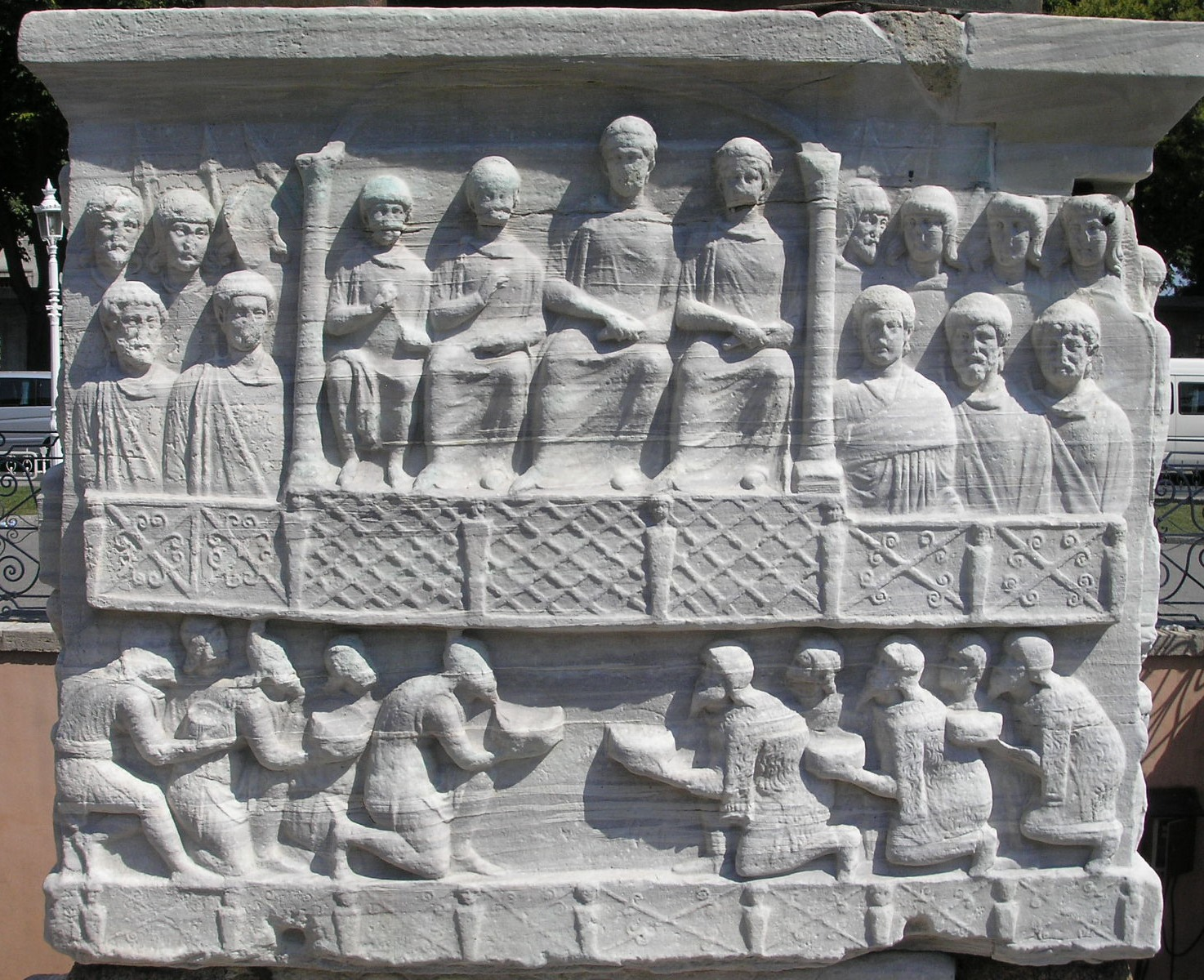
Submission of the barbarians (west face).

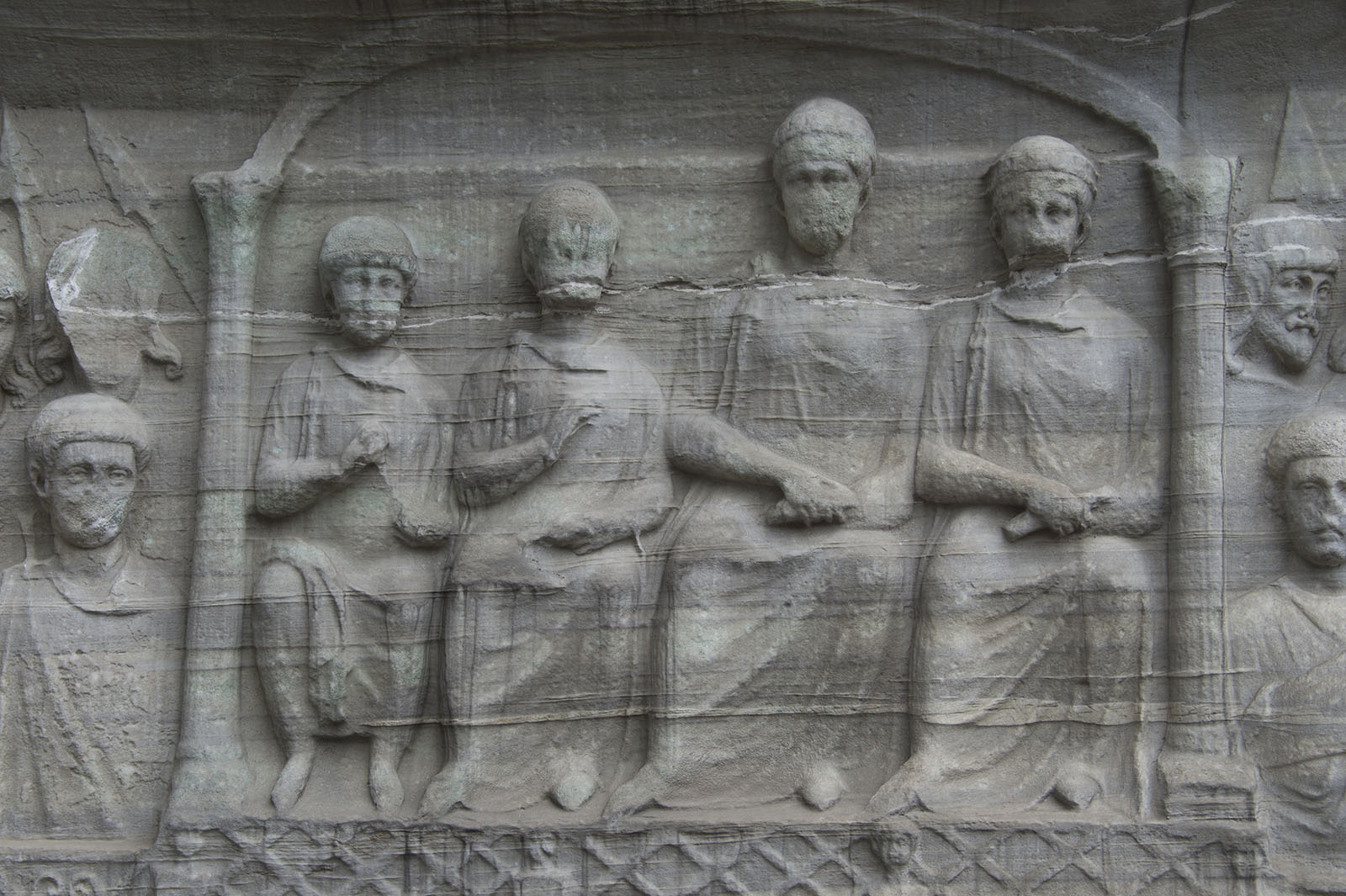
Theodosius and his co-emperors receive homage from vanquished enemies

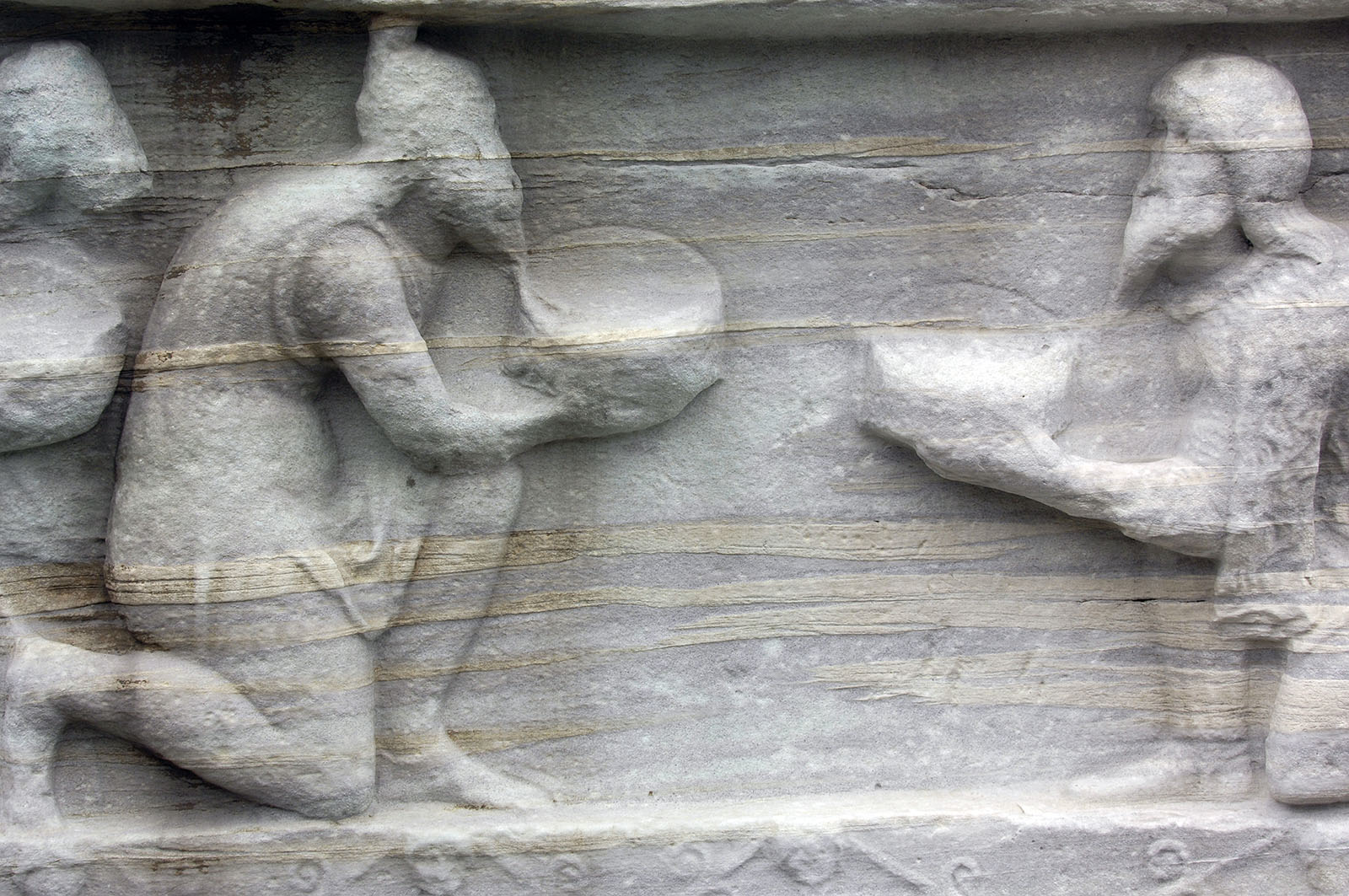
Vanquished enemies bearing tribute

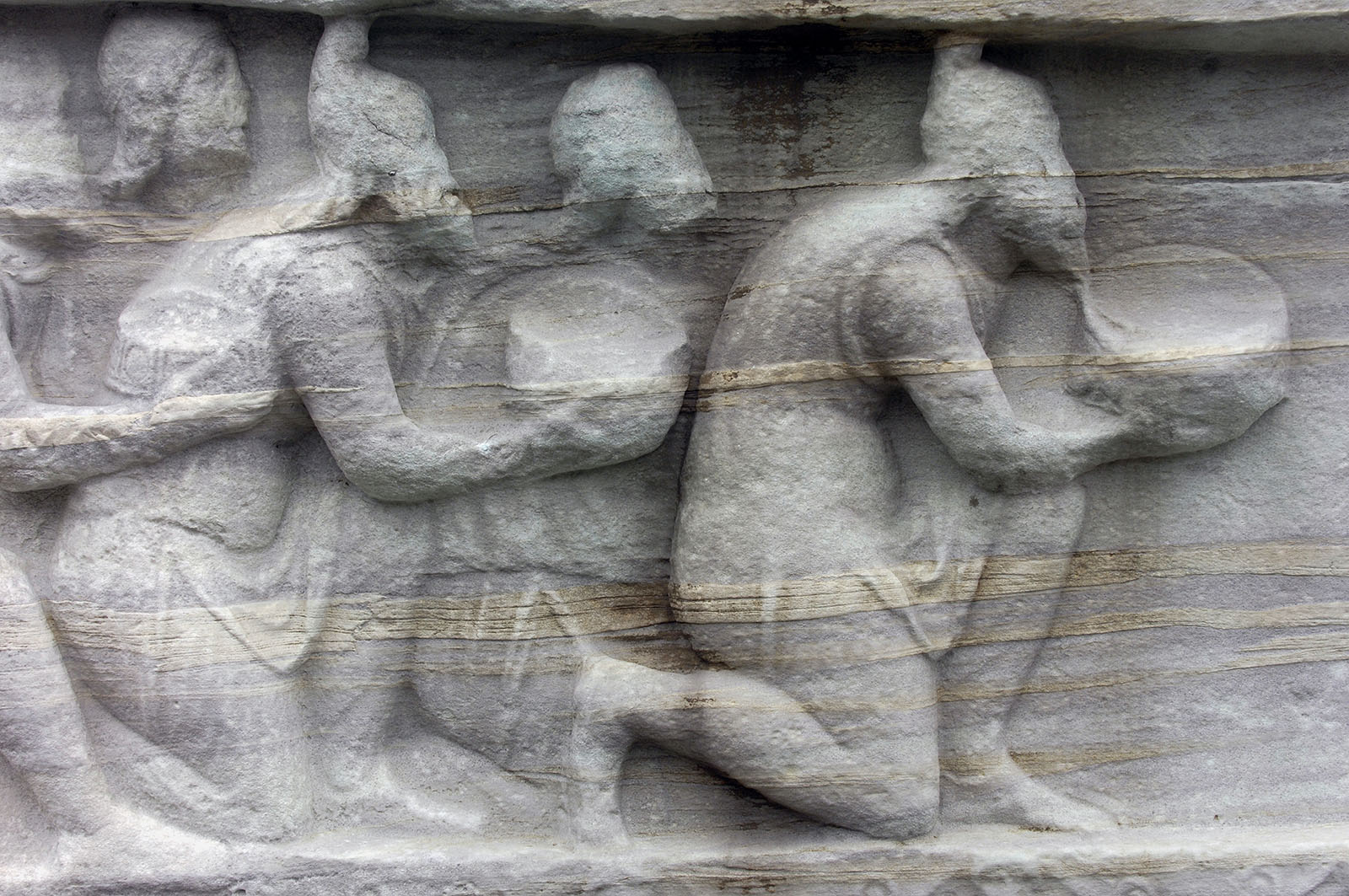
Vanquished enemies bearing tribute

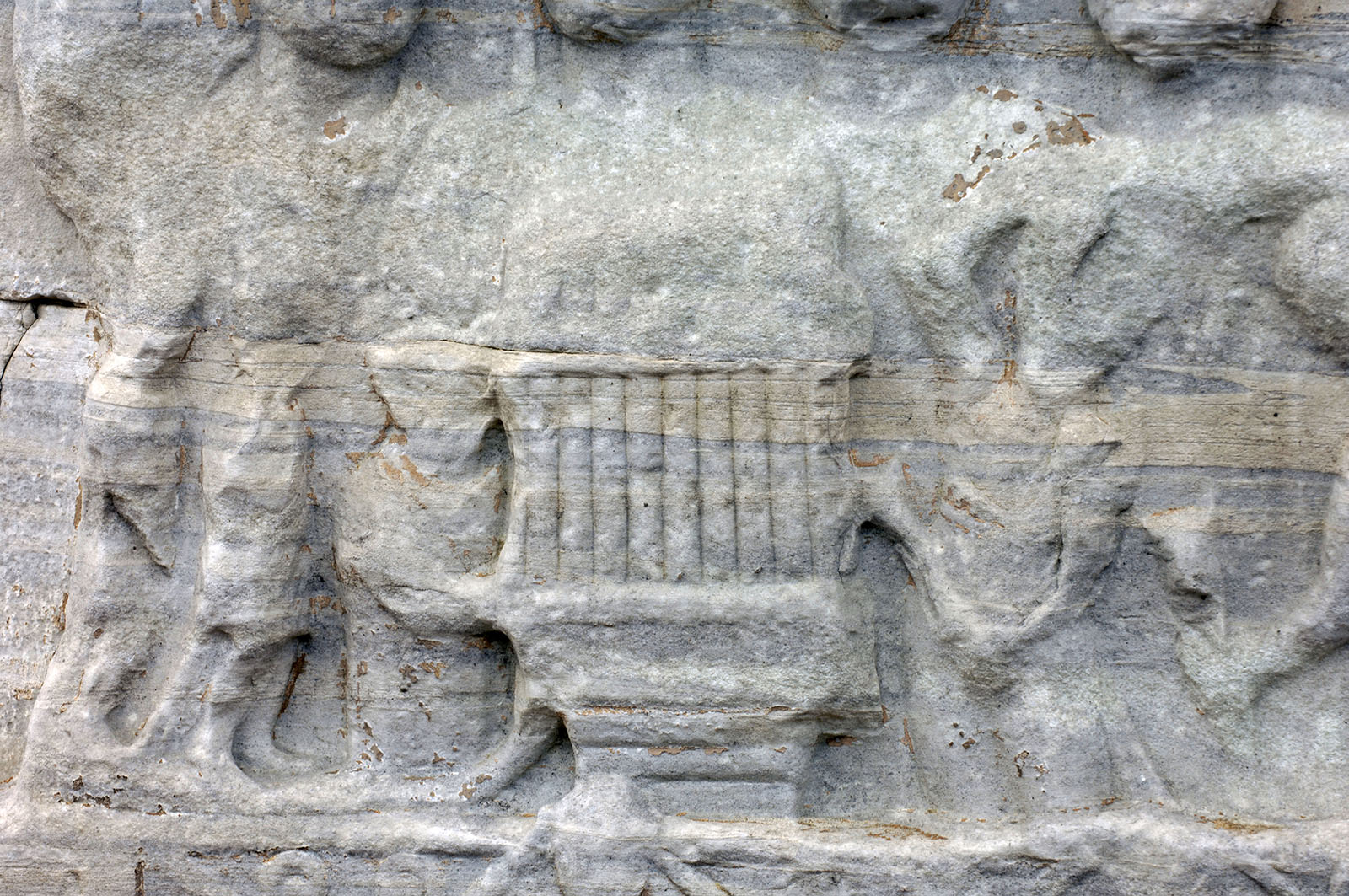
Organ amidst musicians

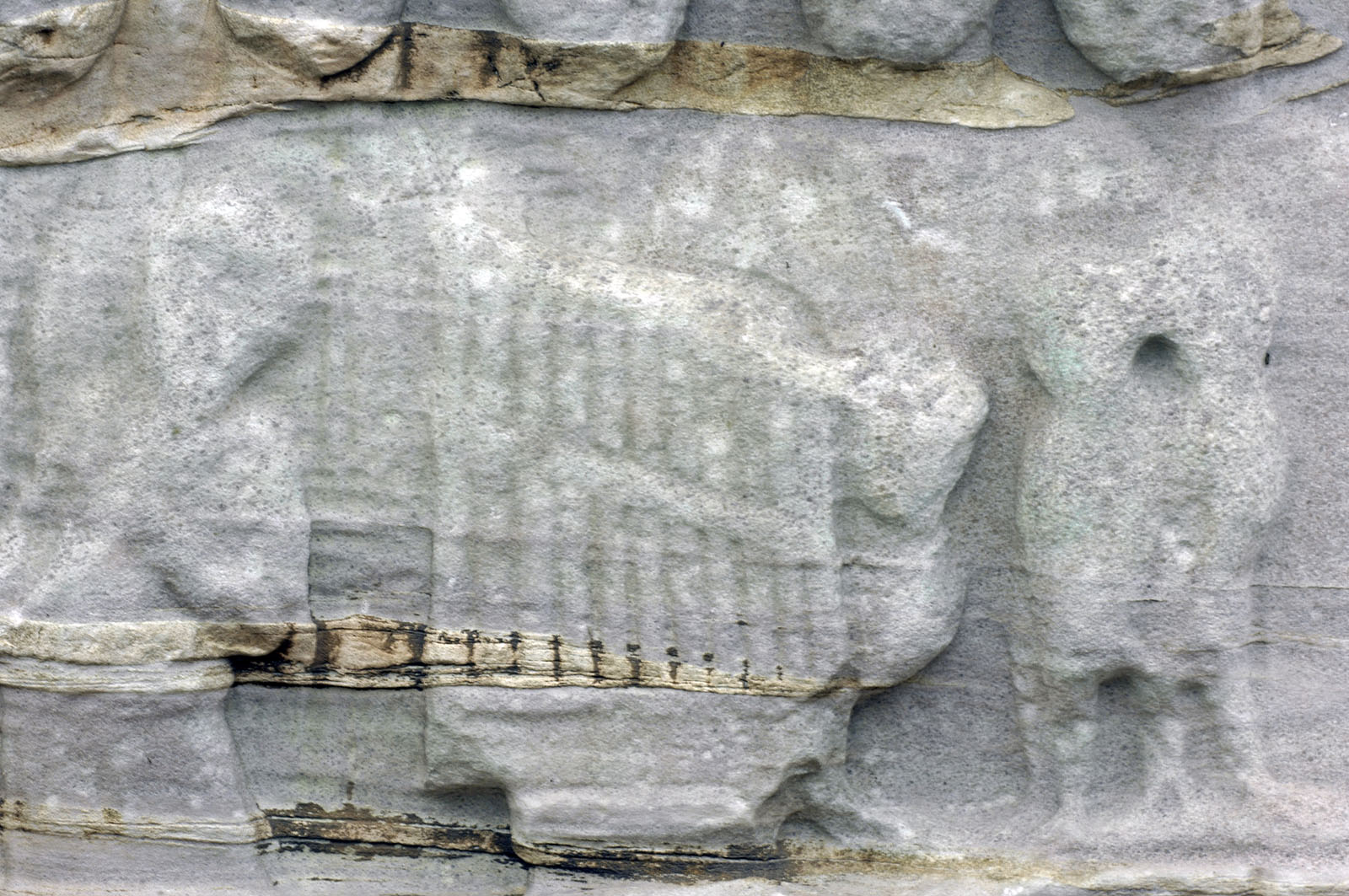
Organ amidst musicians

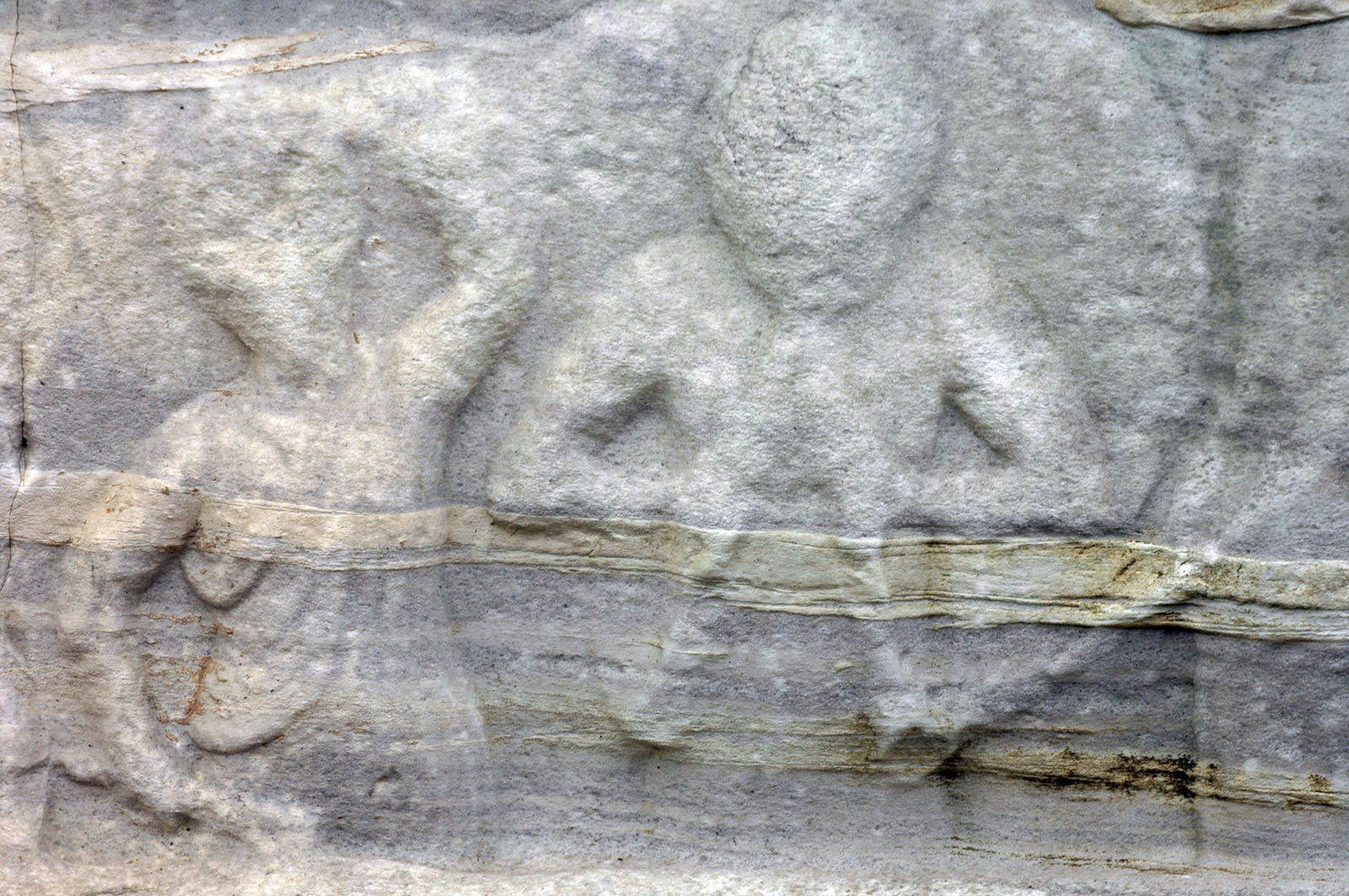
Musicians

There are obvious traces of major damage to the pedestal and energetic restoration of it. Missing pieces have been replaced, at the pedestal's bottom corners, by cubes of porphyry resting on the bronze cubes already mentioned – the bronze and porphyry cubes are of identical form and dimensions. There is also a vertical gash up one of the obelisk's faces, which looks like a canal from above. These repairs to the base may be linked to the cracking of the obelisk itself after its suffering a serious accident (perhaps an earthquake) at an unknown date in antiquity.

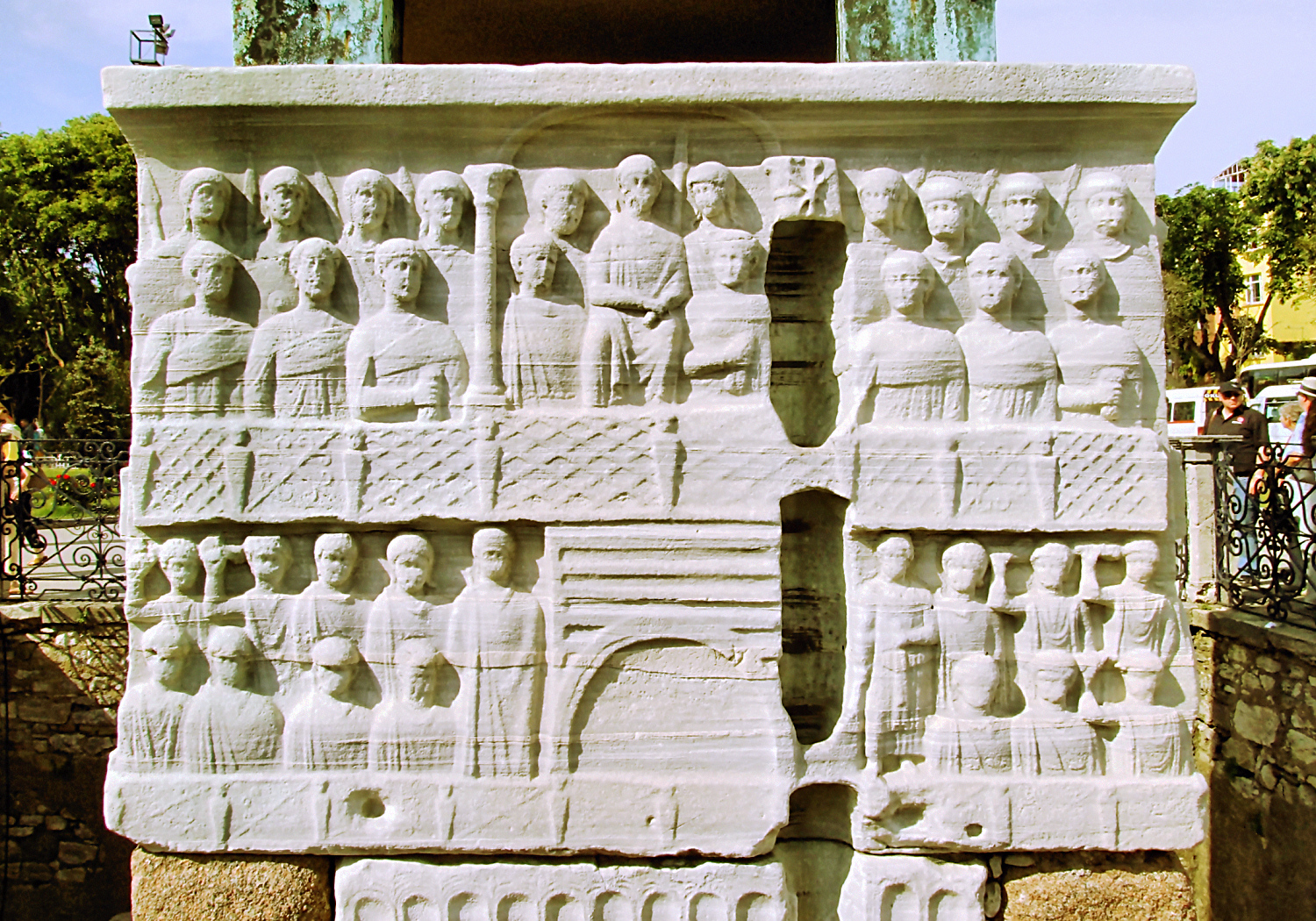
The emperor and his court, bronze and porphyry cubes, gash (north face)

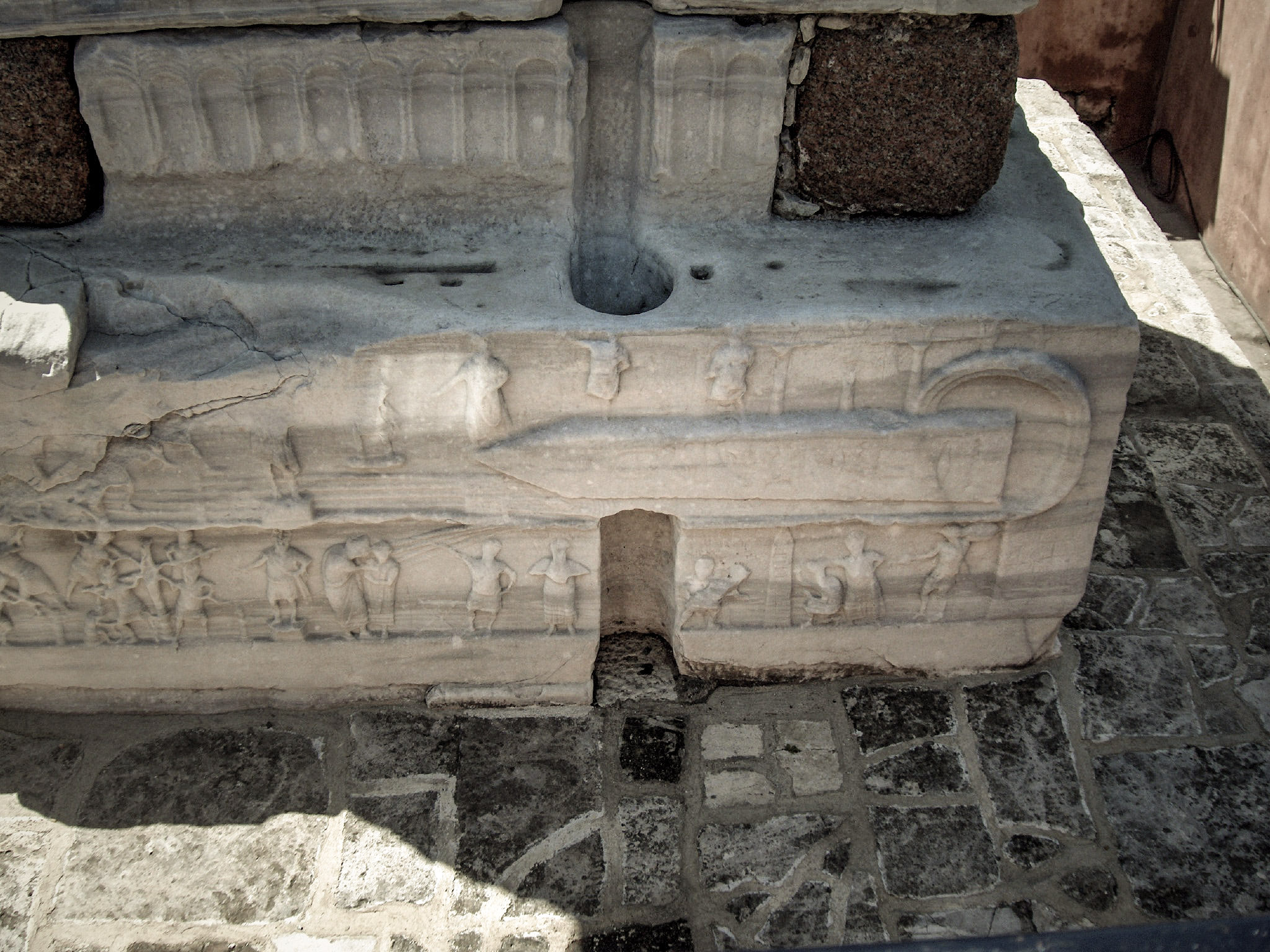
Transport of the obelisk.
Traces of a vertical gash (north face)

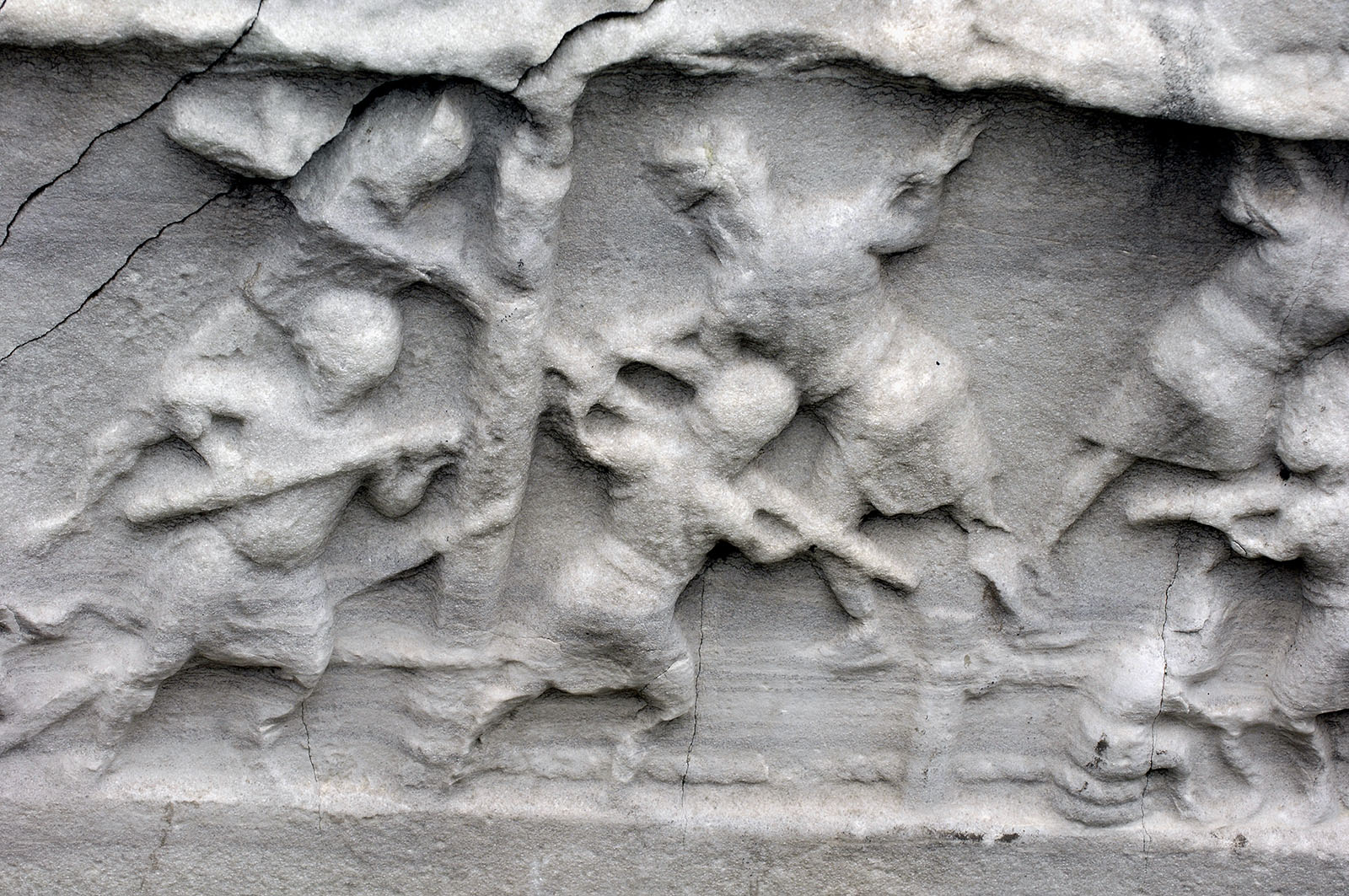
Erecting the obelisk

=== Inscriptions ===
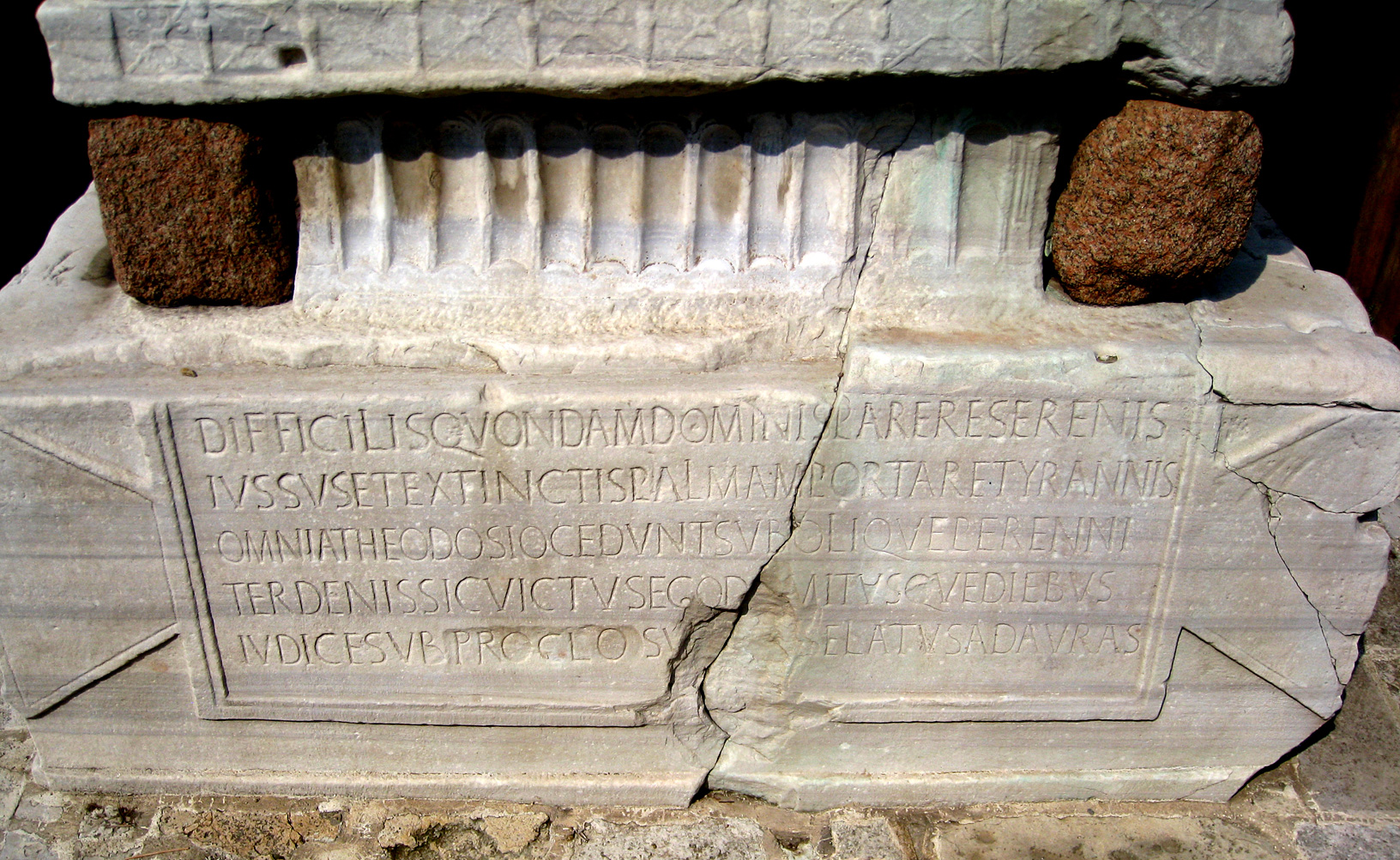
Latin inscription (east face)

The pedestal's east face bears an inscription in five Latin hexameters. This is slightly broken at the bottom but it was transcribed in full by travelers in the 16th century. It reads:

DIFFICILIS QVONDAM DOMINIS PARERE SERENIS
IVSSVS ET EXTINCTIS PALMAM PORTARE TYRANNIS
OMNIA THEODOSIO CEDVNT SVBOLIQVE PERENNI
TER DENIS SIC VICTVS EGO DOMITVSQVE DIEBVS
IVDICE SVB PROCLO SVPERAS ELATVS AD AVRAS

Translation:

"Formerly reluctant, I was ordered to obey the serene lords and carry the palm of extinct tyrants. Everything yields to Theodosius and his everlasting offspring. So conquered and vanquished in three times ten days, I was raised to the lofty sky while Proculus was judge."

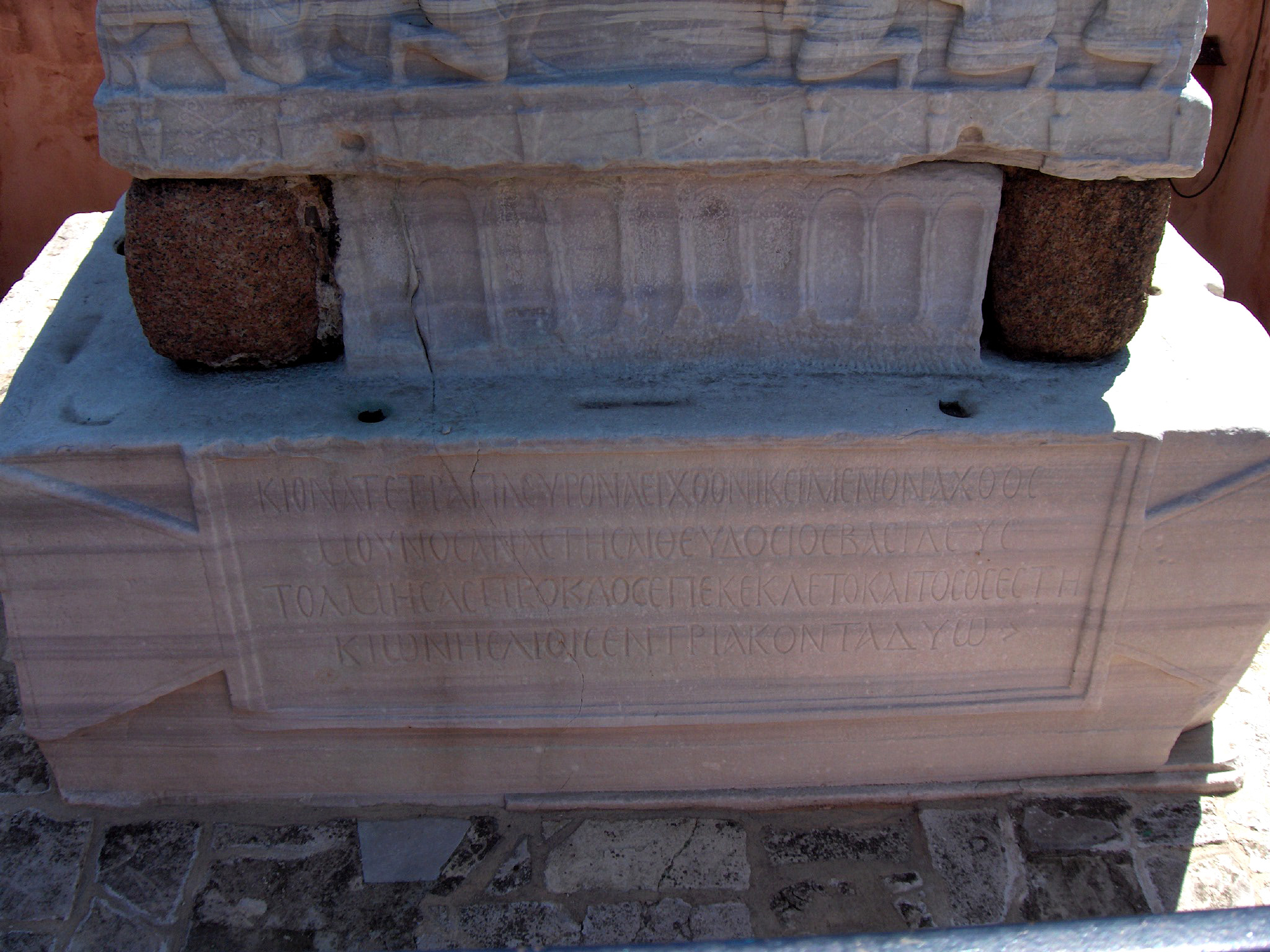
Greek inscription (west face)

On the west face the same idea is repeated in two elegiac couplets rendered in Byzantine Greek, though this time it reports that the re-erection took 32 days (TPIAKONTA ΔYΩ, last line) not 30:

KIONA TETPAΠΛEYPON AEI XΘONI KEIMENON AXΘOC
MOYNOC ANACTHCAI ΘEYΔOCIOC BACIΛEYC
TOΛMHCAC ΠPOKΛOC EΠEKEKΛETO KAI TOCOC ECTH
KIΩN HEΛIOIC EN TPIAKONTA ΔΥΩ

kiona tetrapleuron aei chthoni keimenon achthos
mounos anastēsai Theudosios basileus
tolmēsas Proklos epekekleto kai tosos estē
kiōn ēeliois en triakonta duō

Translation:

"The four-sided column, forever lying heavily on the ground, the emperor Theodosius as the only one dared to erect. He called on Proclus; and thus the column stood in two and thirty days."

In 392, Proculus fell out of favor with the emperor and his name was erased from the Greek inscription, only to be re-inscribed years later.

== See also ==
- List of Egyptian obelisks
- Walled Obelisk

== Bibliography ==
- E. A. Wallis Budge, Cleopatra's Needles and Other Egyptian Obelisks, The Religious Tract Society, London, 1926 (ISBN 0-486-26347-9)
- Michael Grant, "Byzantium is Born: The Reliefs in the Istanbul Hippodrome". FMR Magazine International Edition: America 8, no. 38 (June 1989), pp. 49–62.
- Labib Habachi, The Obelisks of Egypt, skyscrapers of the past, American University in Cairo Press, 1985, ISBN 977-424-022-7
- Bente Kiilerich, The Obelisk Base in Constantinople: Court Art and Imperial Ideology, Rome, 1998 (ActaIRN vol. X; Giorgio Bretschneider)
- "Obelisk of Theodosius", in volume 3 of Alexander Kazhdan (ed.), The Oxford Dictionary of Byzantium, 3 volumes, Oxford University Press, 1991, ISBN 0-19-504652-8
- Linda Safran, "Points of View: The Theodosian Obelisk Base in Context." Greek, Roman, and Byzantine Studies 34, no. 4 (Winter 1993), pp. 409–435.
- (in French) Jean-Pierre Sodini, "Images sculptées et propagande impériale du IV^{e} au VI^{e} siècles : recherches récentes sur les colonnes honorifiques et les reliefs politiques à Byzance", Byzance et les images, La Documentation Française, Paris, 1994, ISBN 2-11-003198-0, pp. 43–94.
