= Franco Maria Ricci =

Italian artist and publisher

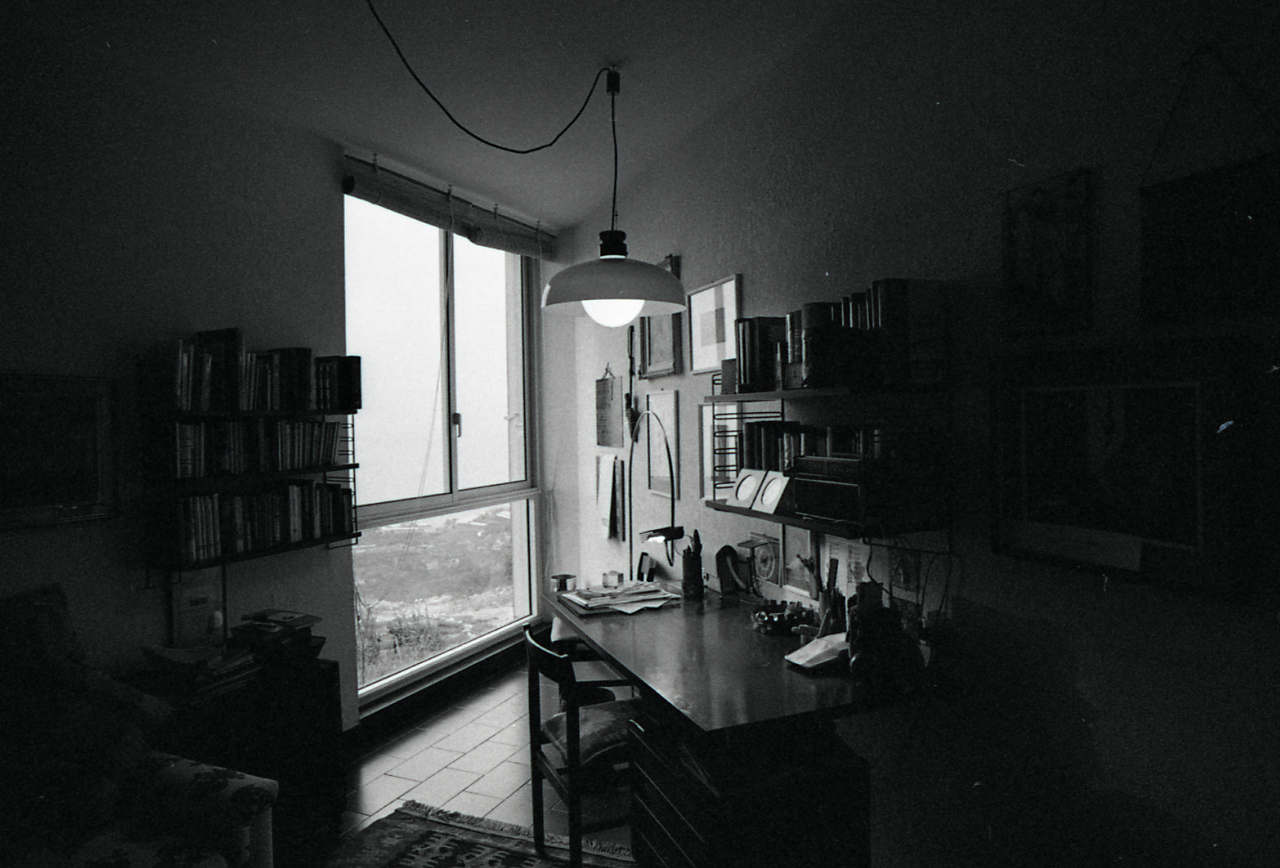
Franco Maria Ricci's office in his house in Imperia. Photography by Paolo Monti, 1981. Fondo Paolo Monti, BEIC

Franco Maria Ricci (2 December 1937 – 10 September 2020) was an Italian art publisher and magazine editor. Amongst his publications is FMR, a Milan-based bi-monthly art magazine published in Italian, English, German, French, and Spanish for over 27 years. Ricci is known for having created limited editions honoring particular independent artists, which are characterized by their tinted handmade paper, and black silk-bound hardcovers with silver or gold lettering stamping. He sold his publishing house, Ricci Editore, to Marilena Ferrari in 2007 only to regain control in 2015.

== FMR magazine ==
The first issue of FMR was published in 1982. The title FMR is made of the initials of the publisher's name and also, when pronounced in French, sounds like éphémère, a word with rich connotations that translates as "fleeting" or "transitory". It contained noteworthy iconological and art historical studies, illustrated with large photographs and drawings reproduced on a black background. Among FMR's high-profile admirers were Federico Fellini, who called it the "black pearl", and Jacqueline Kennedy, who declared that it was "the most beautiful magazine in the world". In December 2002, twenty years after the release of the first issue, Ricci sold the magazine to Marilena Ferrari's company Art'é. In 2003 art critic and curator Flaminio Gualdoni replaced Ricci as editor of the magazine. In 2007 FMR was augmented by FMR White, a sister publication devoted to contemporary art. Over the years the two publications featured many notable contributors, including Alberto Arbasino, Peter Bloch, Jorge Luis Borges, Italo Calvino, Umberto Eco, Giovanni Mariotti, Octavio Paz, Nicola Spinosa, and Giovanni Testori. Both FMR and FMR White ceased publication in 2009. In 2015, Ricci bought back the copyrights of FMR with the potential intent to resume publication.

== Labirinth in Fontanellato ==
In 2003 Ricci, after selling FMR, started working on the ambitious project to create the largest maze in the world. The "Labirinto della Masone", in Fontanellato, was eventually completed in 2015. It is a seven-hectares wide maze and also features an art museum and a library.

== Other publications ==
Ricci is known for having published the original edition of the Codex Seraphinianus and some of Guido Crepax's books.
