= Labirinto della Masone =

Museum; cultural park and bamboo labyrinth in Italy

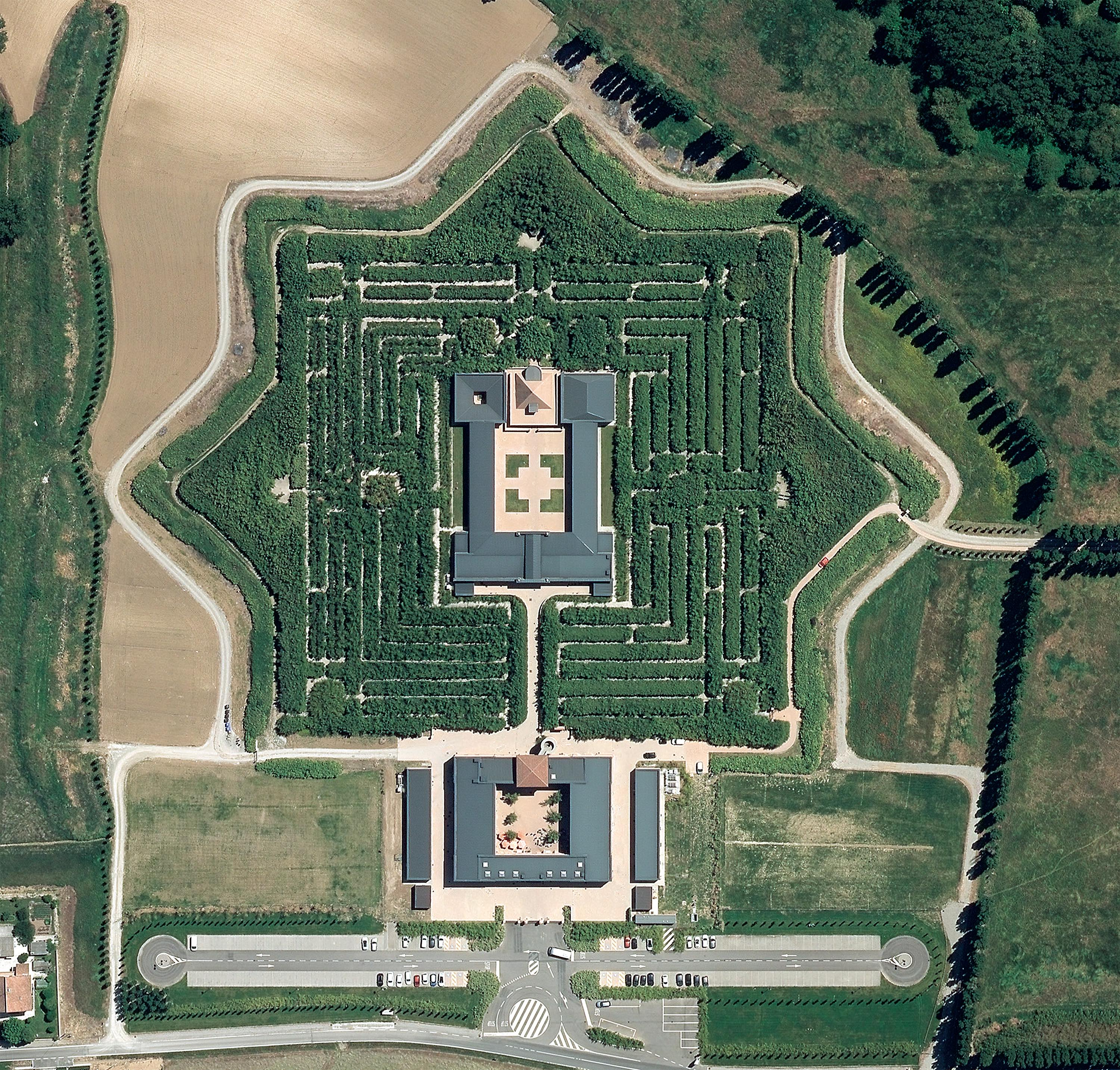
Overview of Labirinto della Masone

Labirinto della Masone (the Masone Labyrinth, named for its location in the Masone district), is a maze in the town of Fontanellato near Parma, Italy. It was built by art publisher, designer and editor Franco Maria Ricci (1937–2020) on the suggestion of the Argentine writer Jorge Luis Borges, who was one of Ricci's closest friends. Constructed entirely of bamboo, the maze was at the time of its realization the largest permanent labyrinth in the world, about eight hectares in area. Following Ricci's death, the maze became a local tourist attraction. It is adjoined by an arts complex including a museum displaying Ricci's art collection and typographical holdings (especially those of Giambattista Bodoni) and another art gallery exhibiting Ricci's work as a graphic designer.

The site also houses the archive of Ricci's publishing house, temporary exhibition halls, conference facilities, concert venues, a restaurant and a café.

The museum is part of the Association of Castles of the Dukes of Parma, Piacenza, and Pontremoli.

Though the labyrinth lost the title of the largest in the world in 2018 to the Yancheng Dafeng Dream Maze in Yancheng, Jiangsu, PRC, it is still considered the biggest labyrinth made of bamboo plants.
