= Sanctuary of the Blessed Virgin of the Holy Rosary =

Minor basilica in Fontanellato, Italy

Sanctuary of the Blessed Virgin of the Holy Rosary Santuario della Beata Vergine del Santo Rosario (in Italian)
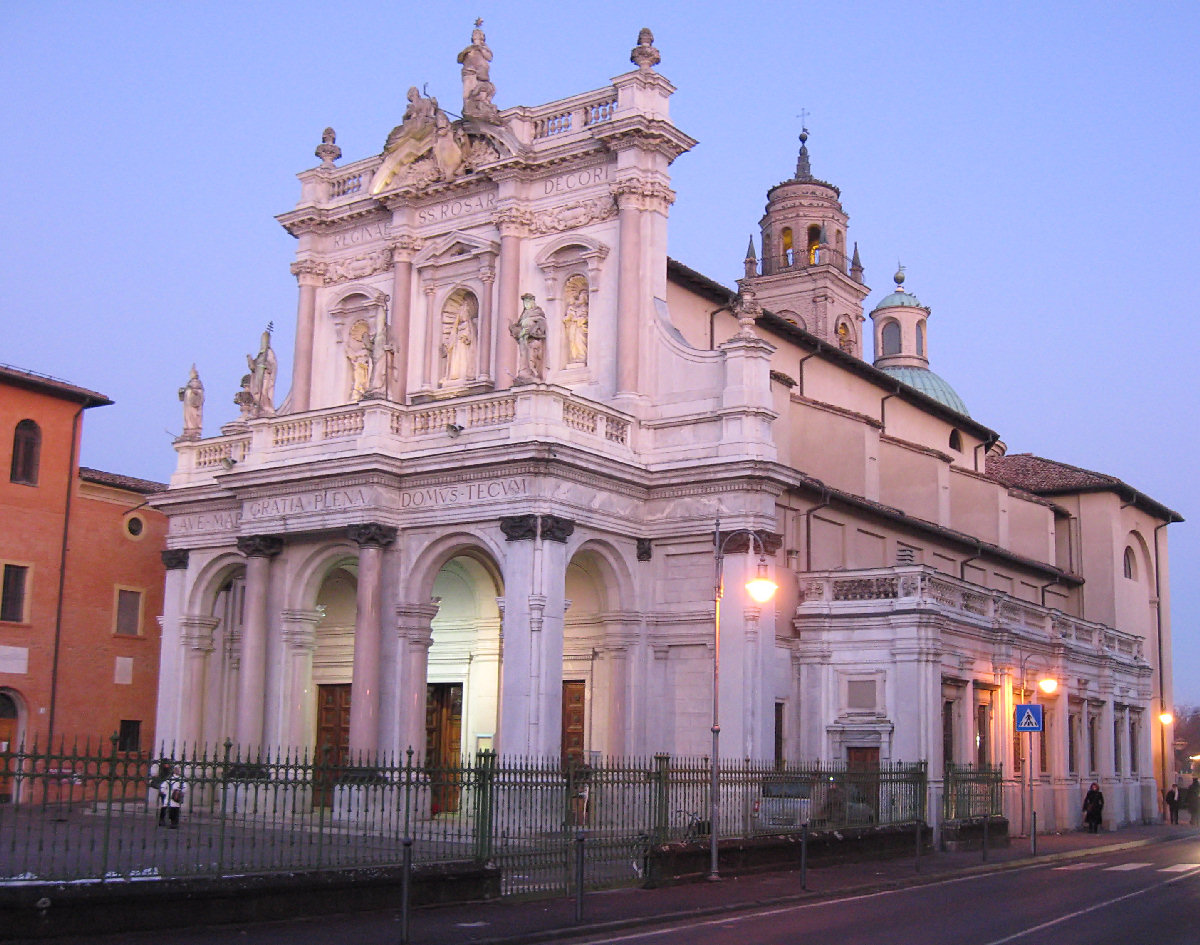
- The sanctuary of the Virgin of Fonatanellato

Religion
- Affiliation: Roman Catholic
- Ecclesiastical or organisational status: Minor basilica

Location
- Location: Fontanellato, Italy
- Interactive map of Sanctuary of the Blessed Virgin of the Holy Rosary; Santuario della Beata Vergine del Santo Rosario (in Italian)
- Coordinates: 44.88333°N 10.18333°E

Architecture
- Style: Baroque
- Groundbreaking: 1641
- Completed: 1660

Website
- http://www.santuariofontanellato.it/

The Sanctuary of the Blessed Virgin of the Holy Rosary is a minor basilica in Fontanellato, Province of Parma, northern Italy. One can see the bell tower of the sanctuary near the Fidenza gate of the A1 autostrada. It is about 20 kilometres (12 mi) west of Parma.

== History ==
In 1512, Veronica da Correggio founded a Dominican monastery in Fontanellato. A brotherhood dedicated to Our Lady of the Rosary and a chapel were established in the monastery church in the second half of the sixteenth century.

In 1641, construction of a larger church began; it was inaugurated on 18 August 1660 with the coronation of the statue by the Bishop of Fidenza Alessandro Pallavicini. The front was completed in 1680. Construction of a new convent began in 1672.

In 1769, Ferdinand, Duke of Parma took the sanctuary to the Dominicans who were then reassigned in 1775. With the suppression of religious orders, by Napoleon I in 1805, the convent became the school of the Canossians Sisters and the Boys' School of St. Stephen, named "Corpo dell'Industria".

In 1816, Marie Louise, Duchess of Parma, granted the convent to Dominican sisters of Colorno. The monastery was restored in 1822 and the church in 1858–1860. With the suppression of religious orders in 1866 the building of the convent passed to the municipality, from which it was given-back to Dominicans in 1879.

In August 1903, pope Pius X elevated the church to the rank of minor basilica. In the years 1913–1920 a new monumental neo-baroque facade was replaced by the architect Lamberto Cusani, joined by an orphanage, opened in 1925. In the same year it was placed in front of sanctuary of a bronze statue of blessed cardinal Andrea Carlo Ferrari, by sculptor Amleto Cataldi.

The orphanage during the World War II was used as a prison and school for officials-soldiers. It was bombed by the Allies, reopened in 1948 and closed in 1982.

In 1965, an access road to the shrine opened; it includes a portico. In 1978 the monastery was equipped with an internal cloister.

== The structure ==
The church has a form of Latin cross, with a single nave with four chapels. It also has a transept and a small choir area. The paintings are located on the altars of seven chapels, and a wooden crucifix is in the eighth chapel. They were built in 1663.

The facade of 1680 hosts four marble statues (Saint Dominic, Saint Joseph, Saint Rose of Lima and Saint Louis Bertrand). There are some ex-voto in the sacristy of sanctuary, in the gallery of the graces received.

Since 1699 in the sanctuary there are two pipe organ keyboards. They are used to perform concerts and solemn masses. The organists, as of ????, are father Daniele Mazzoleni, Roberto Marchesi, and Leonardo Pontremoli.
