= Fontanellato =

- Comune
- Comune di Fontanellato
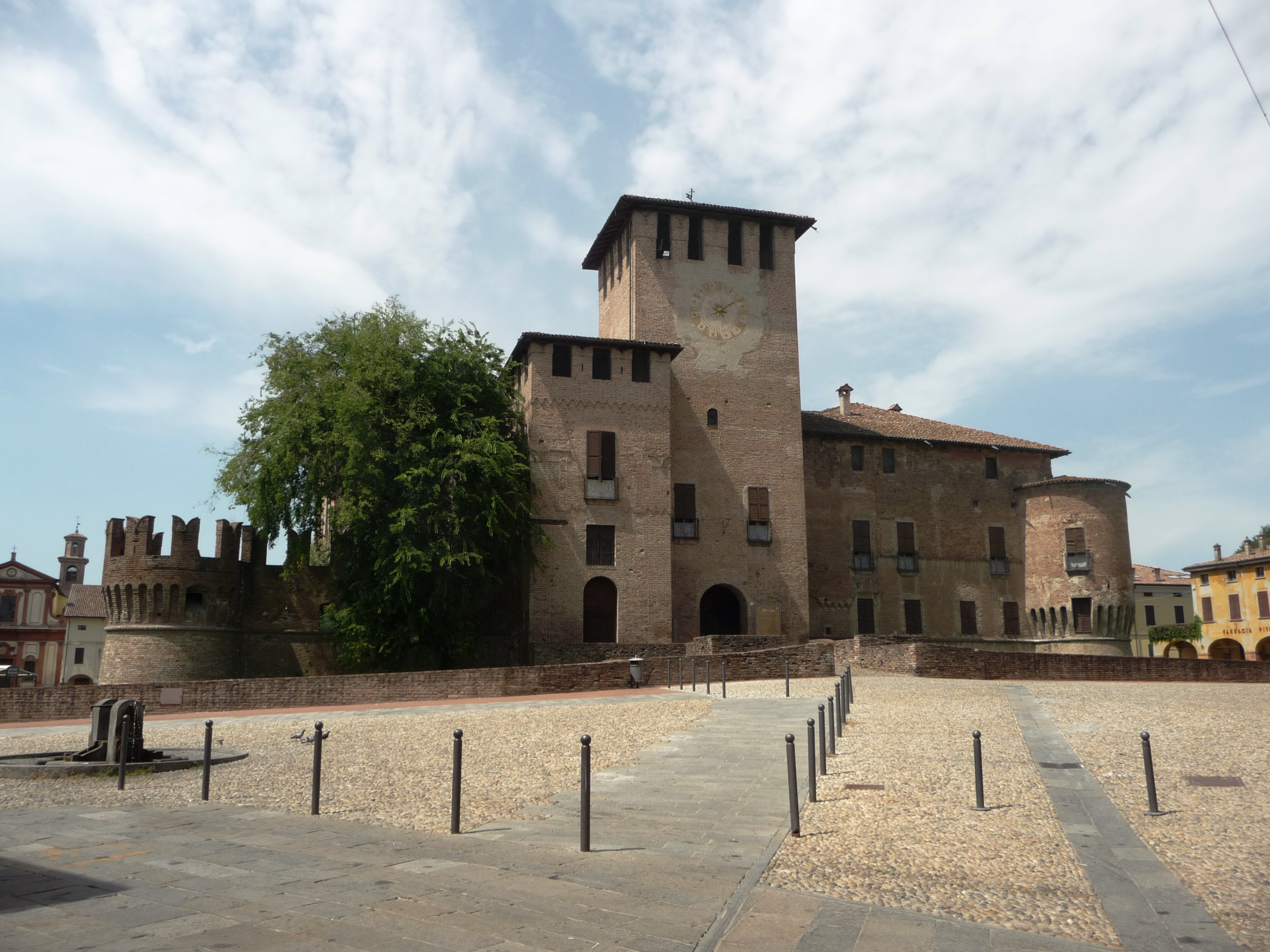
- Rocca Sanvitale

- Coat of arms

- Location within Italy Location within Emilia-Romagna
- Coordinates: 44°53′N 10°11′E
- Country: Italy
- Region: Emilia-Romagna
- Province: Parma (PR)
- Frazioni: Albareto, Cannetolo, Casalbarbato, Ghiara, Ghiara Sabbioni, Grugno, Parola, Paroletta, Priorato, Rosso, Sanguinaro, Toccalmatto

Government
  - Mayor: Luigi Spinazzi

Area
  - Total: 53 km^{2} (20 sq mi)
- Elevation: 45 m (148 ft)

Population (31 May 2022)
  - Total: 7,003
  - Density: 130/km^{2} (340/sq mi)
- Time zone: UTC+1 (CET)
  - Summer (DST): UTC+2 (CEST)
- Postal code: 43012
- Dialing code: 0521
- Website: Official website

Fontanellato (Parmigiano: Funtanlè) is a small town in the province of Parma, in northern Italy. It lies on the plains of the River Po near the A1 autostrada, about 20 kilometres (12 mi) west of Parma towards Piacenza.

The town was built up in the 15th century around the moated and fortified house of the Sanvitale family, the Rocca Sanvitale, on the borders of the domain of the Dukes of Parma. The house was occupied by the family until 1951, when it was sold to the commune. One notable feature of the Rocca Sanvitale is a room which serves as a large camera obscura in which a small hole acts as a lens causing an image of an outside scene to be projected inside the room.

The shrine to the Madonna del Rosario commemorates a succession of miracles beginning in 1628.

One of the main attractions of the town is the Labirinto della Masone, once the largest maze in the world, built by native son Franco Maria Ricci totally from Bamboo.

== History ==
The territory corresponding to today's Fontanellato was already inhabited during the Bronze Age, as demonstrated by the studies carried out by Luigi Pigorini at the end of the 19th century. It was later colonized by the Romans. The toponym Fontanellato probably derives from the medieval "Fontana Lata" (large spring), with reference to the natural springs of the plain that can still be observed today in the Lower Parma area; the same water ditch, still present around the Sanvitale fortress, is to be associated with these spring phenomena.

A massive reclamation took place shortly after 1000 by the Cistercian monks of the nearby abbey of Fontevivo. Starting from 1100, Fontanellato found itself at the center of the struggles between the nascent municipalities along the Via Emilia; the first nucleus of the castle dates back to that time: in 1124 the first defensive tower of the village was erected by the Pallavicinos. In 1145, Fontanellato was sold by Oberto Pallavicino to the town of Piacenza; subsequently it changed hands several times, until 1386, the year in which Antonio Sanvitale became feudal lord. In the early years of the 15th century, the management of the territory, the fortress, the infrastructures and the legislative, judicial and executive system of the Fontanellatese territory was entrusted on an operational level to the mayor of Azarino Platoni.

The Sanvitale family maintained a close link with the village for more than five centuries: only in 1948 did Giovanni Sanvitale sell the castle to the municipal administration, which subjected it to complete restoration, transforming it into an important tourist attraction, home to fairs, exhibitions and events.

== Tourism and culture ==
The ancient village preserves various monuments of interest; the Sanvitale fortress is of particular value, while the sanctuary of the Beata Vergine del Santo Rosario attracts many pilgrims.

=== Rocca Sanvitale ===
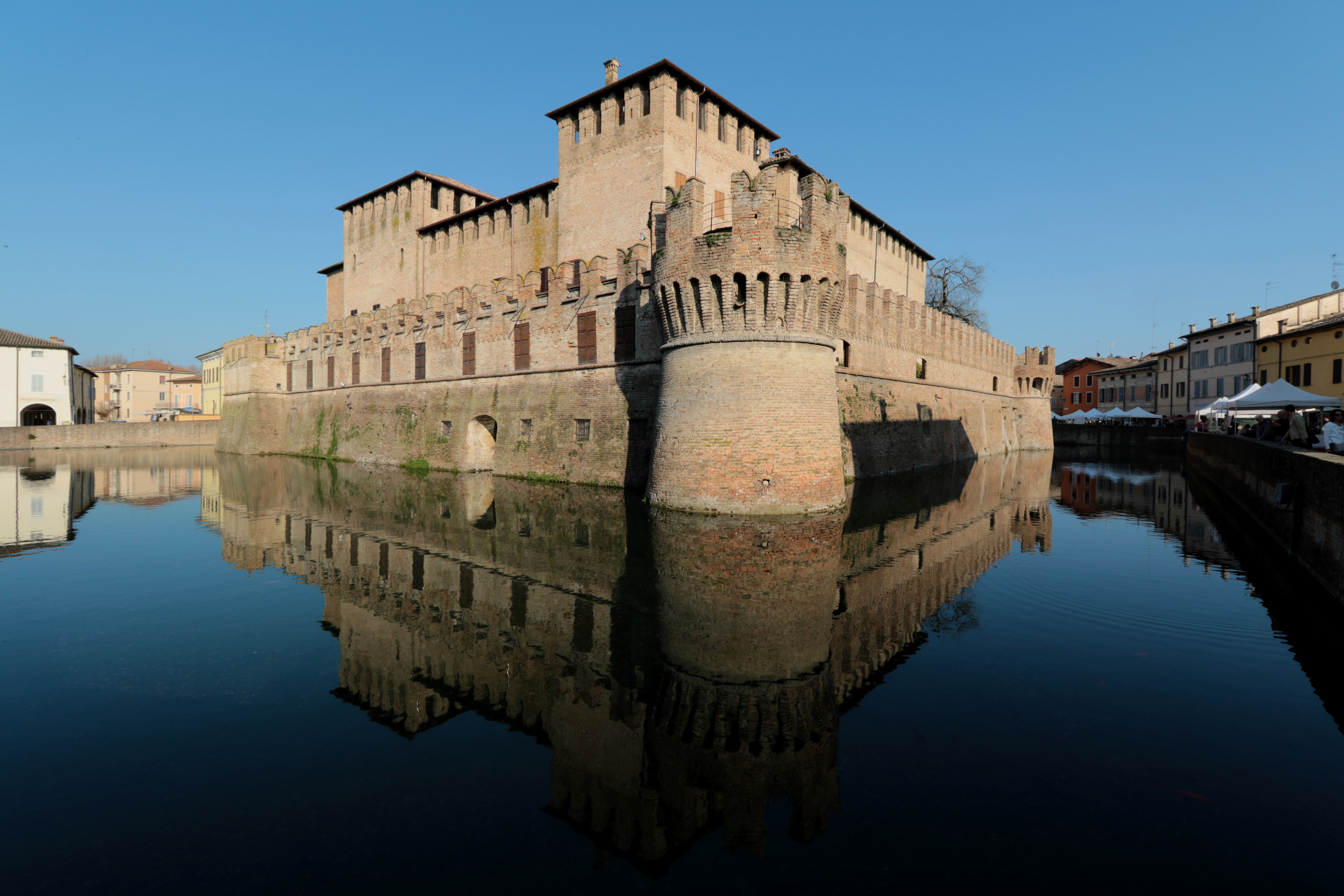
Rocca Sanvitale seen from the West

Originally built in 1124 as a defensive tower at the behest of the Pallavicino marquises, the fortification, granted to the Sanvitale family in 1378, was completely rebuilt between 1386 and around 1400 and extended until the 16th century. In the early seventeenth century the fortress suffered an attack by the Spanish army, which caused damage to the fortifications; consequently the court engineer Smeraldo Smeraldi was charged with the arrangement of the moat, on which a new masonry bridge was built to replace the old drawbridge. Internally transformed into an elegant noble residence, the fortress was partially modified in the 19th century with the construction of the hanging garden, the arrangement of the internal courtyard with the elegant loggia on three levels and the creation of the dark chamber in the circular tower to the south. In 1948 the last count Giovanni Sanvitale sold the fortress to the municipal administration, which used it as a municipal seat and opened some rooms to the public. Inside, the castle preserves numerous rooms that can be visited on the noble floor and on the ground floor, rich in frescoes in part from the sixteenth century and adorned with fine furnishings and paintings dating back to the seventeenth and eighteenth centuries; among all the most important is the room of Diana and Atteone, painted by Parmigianino between 1523 and 1524.

=== Sanctuary of the Beata Vergine del Santo Rosario ===
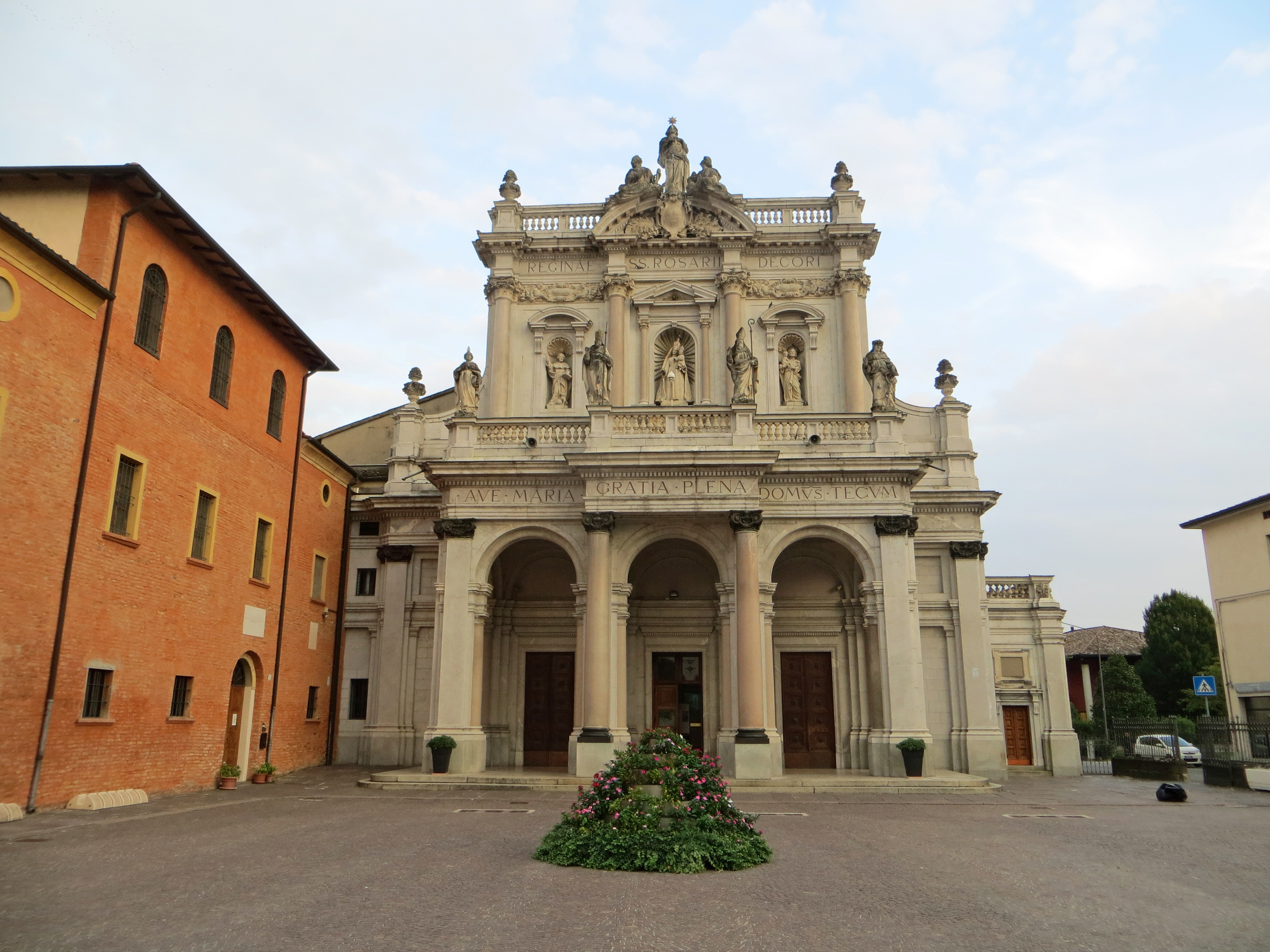
Sanctuary of the Beata Vergine del Santo Rosario

Built by the Dominican friars in 1514 on the site of a small oratory dating back to 1397, in 1543 the Sanvitale counts were forced to demolish the entire structure, to quickly obtain the bricks necessary for the construction of the walls of the village, threatened by the Milanese troops; in 1550 the friars moved to the Benedictine monastery of Priorato, before returning in 1552 to the destroyed monastery of San Giuseppe, which they completely rebuilt. The sanctuary was again completely rebuilt in Baroque style between 1641 and 1660; elevated to the dignity of a minor basilica in 1903, it was enriched in 1912 with the neo-baroque facade designed by the architect Lamberto Cusani. Inside there are various valuable works, including the frescoes of the vault, the seventeenth- and eighteenth-century paintings, the organ of 1696, the baroque furnishings and the numerous ex-votos; among the many statues, the Madonna del Rosario, sculpted in 1615, is the object of great devotion.

=== Labirinto della Masone ===
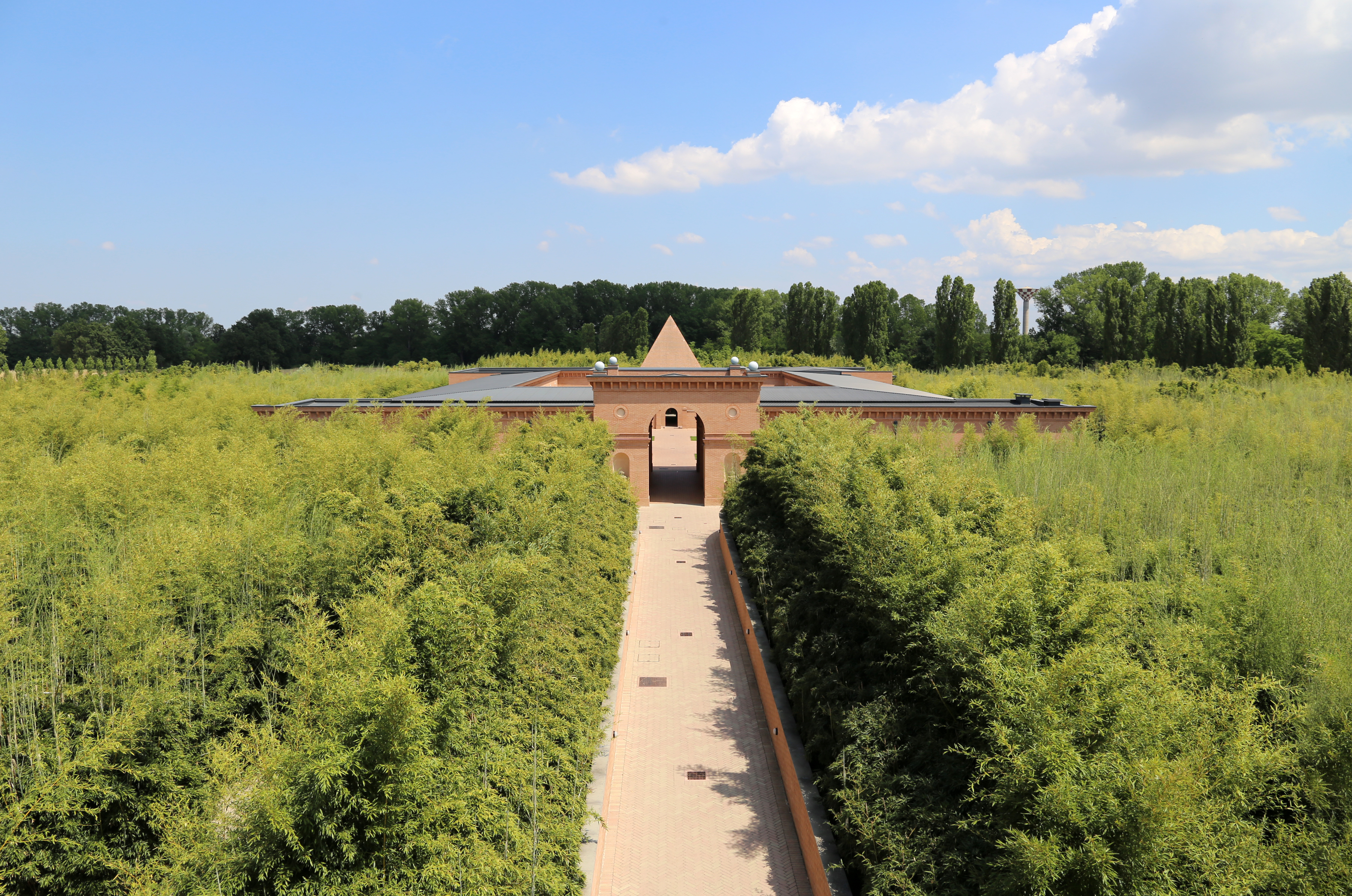
The Mason Labyrinth

The Labirinto della Masone (The Mason Labyrinth) is a cultural park built nearby Fontanellato. It extends for seven hectares and includes a labyrinth made up of bamboo of different species (the largest of its kind in the world) and spaces that house the art collection of Franco Maria Ricci and his publishing house, temporary exhibitions, conferences, concerts, a restaurant, a café and a delicatessen.

The art collection, spread over five thousand square meters, was collected by Franco Maria Ricci in about fifty years of activity, it reflects his personal taste and is constantly expanding. The works, including paintings, sculptures and art objects, are about five hundred. It starts from the 16th century, in particular there are works by Mannerist artists, among which Girolamo Mazzola Bedoli, Luca Cambiaso and Ludovico Carracci stand out. The seventeenth century is widely represented both in painting and in sculpture, with works by Valentin de Boulogne, Philippe de Champaigne, Gian Lorenzo Bernini, Giambattista Foggini, Lorenzo Merlini. Ample space is dedicated to the eighteenth and nineteenth centuries, with paintings by Francesco Hayez, Giovanni Carnovali, pastels by Rosalba Carriera and Jean-Étienne Liotard, watercolors by Giuseppe Pietro Bagetti, marble sculptures from the neoclassical period depicting mainly characters linked to Napoleon (and Napoleon himself), by Antonio Canova, Lorenzo Bartolini, François Joseph Bosio and French terracottas. Particular attention is paid to artists originating in the Parma area or who have worked there, making an important artistic contribution, including Pietro Melchiorre Ferrari, Giuseppe Baldrighi and Jean Baptiste Boudard. Another main theme of the collection is that of the Vanitas, in which the works of Jacopo Ligozzi and Maurizio Bottoni stand out. As for the twentieth century, the sculptures by Adolfo Wildt and Demetre Chiparus, the paintings by Antonio Ligabue and Alberto Savinio and the tempera by Erté are noteworthy. Finally, there are also numerous art objects, including a wooden model of the Milan Cathedral and one of the Cathedral of Ulm, two narwhal teeth, and an altar in semiprecious stones and ebony.

== World War II POW camp ==
During World War II, a large brick building with stone facings and neo-classical features next to the Sanctuary of the Blessed Virgin of the Holy Rosary, intended for an orphanage (but never used as such), was the prisoner-of-war camp PG (Prigioniero di Guerra) 49. From here 600 Allied officers and men escaped, thanks to the decision by the Commandant, Colonel Eugenio Vicedomini, to open the gates the day after the Armistice of 8 September 1943.

On 6–9 September 2013, to celebrate the 70th anniversary of this event a conference was held in the Rocca on prisoners of war in World War II, with other celebrations and commemorations, jointly by the town and the Monte San Martino Trust. One of the escaping prisoners was the English writer Eric Newby, who memorably detailed his escape and subsequent experiences in the 1971 memoir, Love and War in the Apennines.

The building is now a centre for neurological disorders.

== Twin cities ==
Fontanellato is twinned with:

- Kißlegg, Germany
- Falköping, Sweden
- Wells, United Kingdom
