= Alberto Arbasino =

Italian writer and politician (1930–2020)

Nino Alberto Arbasino
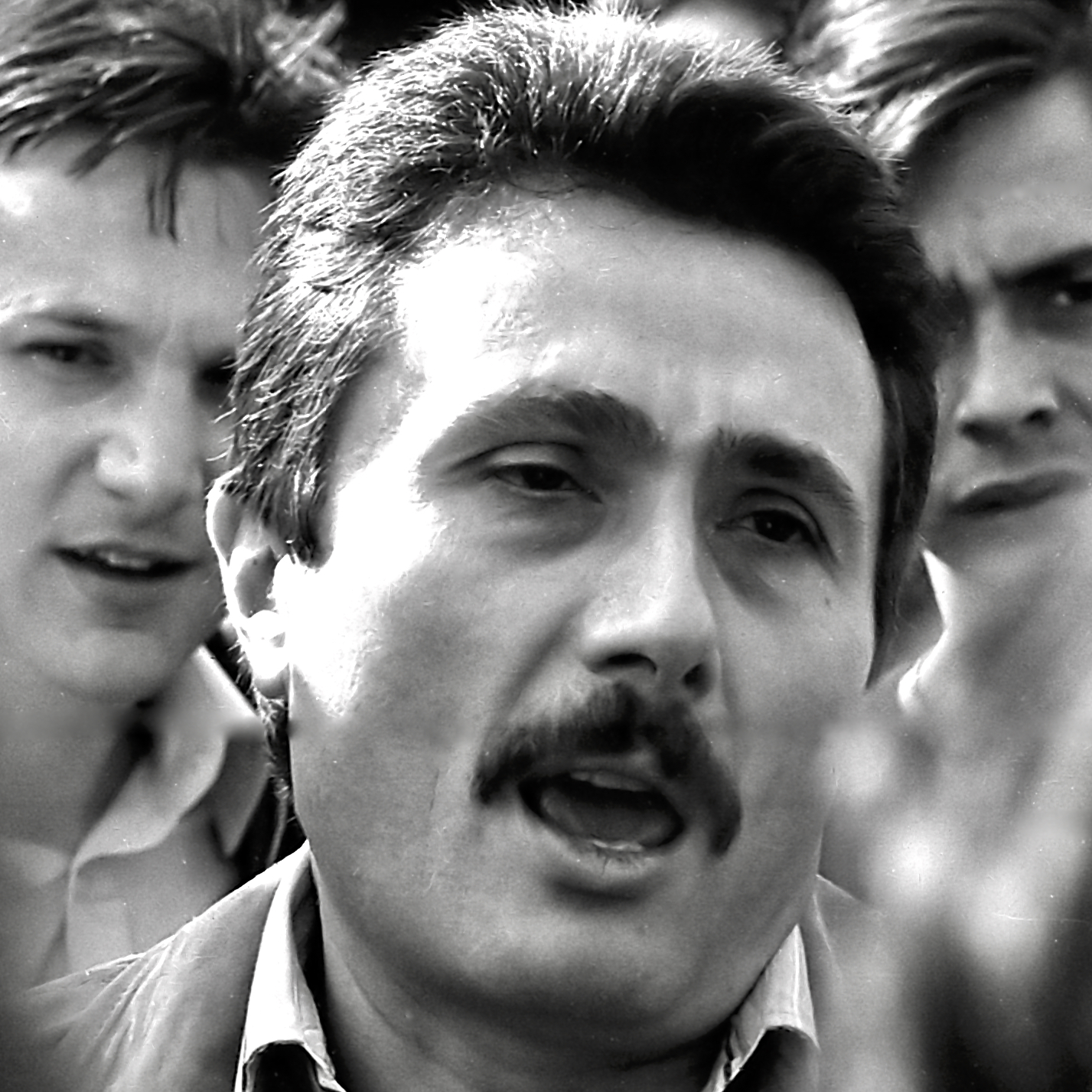
- Arbasino in 1976
- Born: 22 January 1930; Voghera, Lombardy, Italy
- Died: 22 March 2020 (aged 90); Milan, Lombardy, Italy
- Education: University of Milan; Harvard University; University of Pavia
- Occupations: Writer, essayist
- Writing career
- Language: Italian
- Notable work: Super Elagabalus
- Literary movement: Neoavanguardia

Member of the Chamber of Deputies
- In office 12 July 1983 – 1 July 1987

Personal details
- Party: Italian Republican Party

Nino Alberto Arbasino (22 January 1930 – 22 March 2020) was an Italian writer, essayist, and politician.

Among the protagonists of Group 63, his literary production has ranged from novels (Fratelli d'Italia of 1963, rewritten in 1976 and 1993) to essay (for example Un Paese senza, 1980). He considered himself an expressionist writer, and he considered Super Eliogabalo his most surrealist and also his most expressionist book: "Especially for the descriptions of the places, which are always dreamlike and delusional".

== Biography ==
Arbasino was born in Voghera, southwestern Lombardy. He studied at the University of Milan where he graduated in law. Later he worked as a journalist for magazines such as Il Mondo and the newspaper La Repubblica. From 1983 to 1987, he was a deputy in the Italian Parliament for the Italian Republican Party.

His work includes novels and essays. Arbasino was a member of the Gruppo 63.

He described himself as an expressionist writer and considered his novel Super Eliogabalo ("Super Elagabalus", 1969) as his most surreal and most expressionist book. He edited and rewrote his various works, which were reprinted in updated versions.

Arbasino literary approach to homosexuality broke the Italian stereotype of the "guilty" gay character, particularly in his 1963 novel Fratelli d'Italia. Arbasino was openly gay in his personal life.

In the 1970s he was the host of the TV debate show Match. In December 1977 it hosted a famous debate between directors Mario Monicelli and (the emerging) Nanni Moretti. Moretti said that Monicelli's An Average Little Man was a reactionary film.

In 2004 he won the Premio Chiara for his career.

Arbasino died on 22 March 2020, at the age of 90, after a long illness.

== Works ==
- Le piccole vacanze, Einaudi, 1957 (first edition)
- Le piccole vacanze, Einaudi, 1971, (ISBN 88-06-31658-3) (second edition)
- Le piccole vacanze, Adelphi, 2007, (ISBN 978-88-459-2182-7) (third edition)
- L'Anonimo lombardo, 1959, Einaudi (ISBN 88-06-37002-2)
- Fratelli d'Italia, 1963, 1967, 1976, Einaudi (ISBN 88-06-25106-6)
- Certi romanzi, 1964
- Super Eliogabalo, 1969, 1978, Einaudi (ISBN 88-06-10603-1)
- Certi romanzi – La Belle Epoque per le scuole, 1977, Einaudi (ISBN 88-06-09563-3)
- La narcisata, 1975, Einaudi (ISBN 88-06-42234-0)
- Il principe costante, 2 ed., 1972, Einaudi (ISBN 88-06-34892-2)
- La bella di Lodi, 1972, Einaudi (ISBN 88-06-33183-3)
- In questo Stato, 1978, Garzanti Libri (ISBN 88-11-73946-2)
- Un paese senza, 1980, Garzanti Libri
- Trans – Pacific Express, 1981, Garzanti Libri (ISBN 88-11-59908-3)
- Matine, 1983, Garzanti Libri (ISBN 88-11-59907-5)
- Il meraviglioso, anzi, 1985, Garzanti Libri (ISBN 88-11-59921-0)
- La caduta dei tiranni, 1990, Sellerio di Giorgianni (ISBN 88-389-0642-4)
- Un paese senza, 2 ed., 1990, Garzanti Libri (ISBN 88-11-67405-0)
- Fratelli d'Italia, réédition de 1993, Adelphi (ISBN 88-459-1000-8)
- Mekong, 1994, Adelphi (ISBN 88-459-1081-4)
- Specchio delle mie brame, 1995, Adelphi (ISBN 88-459-1127-6)
- Parigi o cara, 2 ed., 1996, Adelphi (ISBN 88-459-1177-2)
- Lettere da Londra, 1997, Adelphi (ISBN 88-459-1278-7)
- Passeggiando tra i draghi addormentati, 1997, Adelphi
- Paesaggi italiani con zombi, 1998, Adelphi (ISBN 88-459-1404-6)
- Le muse a Los Angeles, 2000, Adelphi
- Rap!, 2001, Feltrinelli
- Dall'Ellade a Bisanzio, 2006, Adelphi
- La Vita bassa, 2009, Adelphi

== Honour ==
- Italy: Knight Grand Cross of the Order of Merit of the Italian Republic (6 December 1995)
