= County of Montone =

Vitelli family coat of arms

The County of Montone was a noble fiefdom in Italy, formed of the town of Montone and its territory. That territory was turned into a county by Antipope John XXIII on 28 August 1414 and granted by him to Braccio da Montone, a condottiero. Pope Martin V refounded it and on Braccio's death in 1424 confirmed it to Braccio's son Carlo. It was under the jurisdiction of the Papal States until 1519, when pope Leo X granted it to Vitello Vitelli, a member of the Vitelli family of Città di Castello. That family held it until 1573 and then from 1598 to 1646, when their line went extinct.

== List of counts ==
- Braccio da Montone (1414-1424)
- Carlo da Montone (1424-?)
- Alessandro Vitelli (? - 1461)
- Paolo Vitelli (1461-1499)
- Vitellozzo Vitelli (1499-1503)
- Vitello Vitelli (1519–28)
- Chiappino II Vitelli (1530–34)
- Camillo II Vitelli (1534–40)
- Alessandro Vitelli (1540–44)
- Camillo II Vitelli and Alessandro Vitelli (1544–46)
- Angela de' Rossi (wife of Alessandro) (1546–47)
- Camillo II Vitelli (1547–50)
- Camillo II Vitelli and Ferrante Vitelli (1550–58)
- Vitellozzo Vitelli (1558–66)
- Ferrante Vitelli (1566–67)
- Ferrante Vitelli and Vincenzo Vitelli (1567–72)
- Paolo II Vitelli and Chiappino II Vitelli (1572–73)
- Direct papal jurisdiction (1573-1598)
- Virginia Savelli Vitelli, wife of Giovanni Vincenzo Vitelli (1598-1634)
- Chiappino III Vitelli (1634–46)

Chiappino III died without issue in 1646 and the county was absorbed into the Papal States, never to be awarded again.

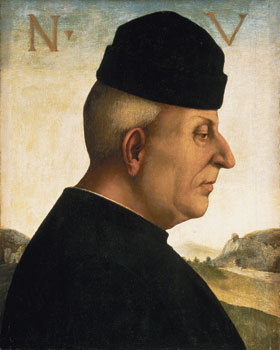
Portrait of Nicclo Vitelli by Luca Signorelli 1492-1496

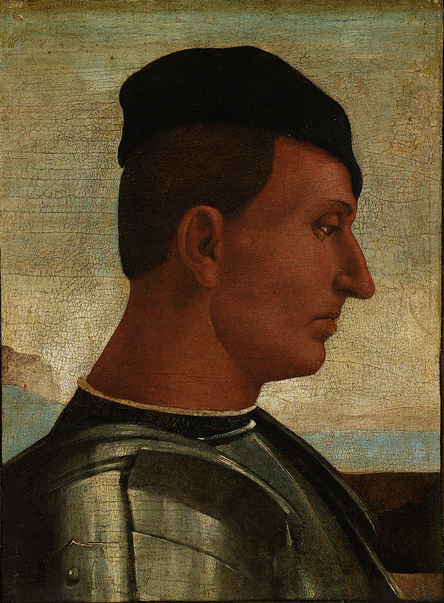
Portrait of Ritratto di Camillo Vitelli by Luca Signorelli (c. 1493–1496)

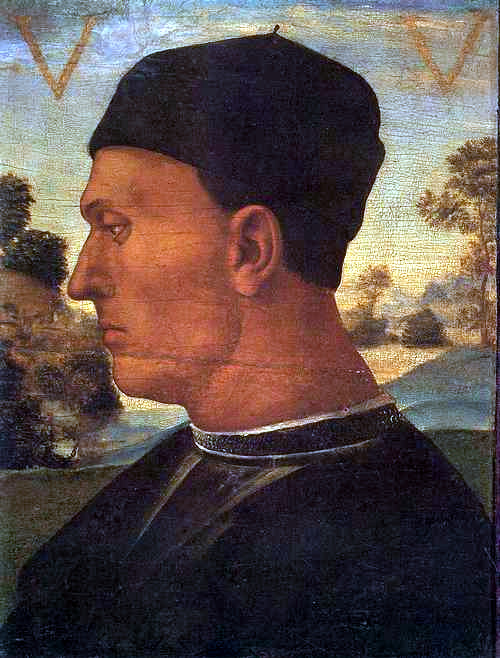
Vitellozzo Vitelli, by Luca Signorelli.

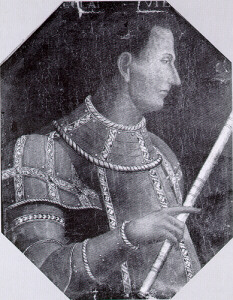
Portrait of Paolo Vitelli

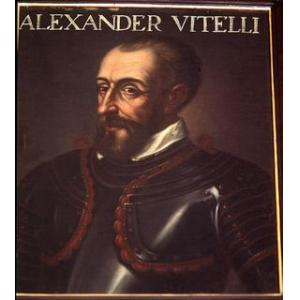
Portrait of Alexander Vitelli

== Sources ==
- https://web.archive.org/web/20120207030737/http://www.comunemontone.it/storia-e-territorio-del-comune.htm
