= Camillo Vitelli =

Italian knight and condottiero

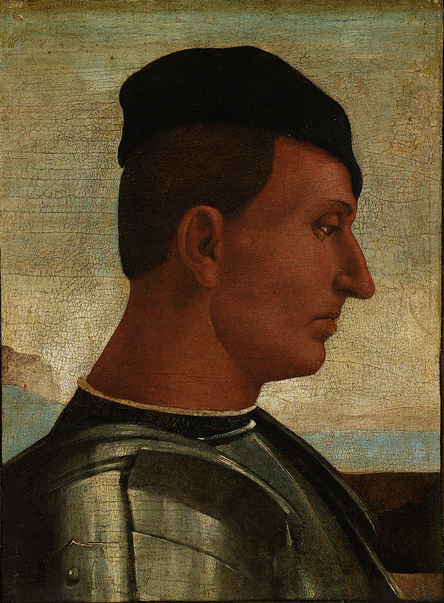
Portrait of Vitelli by Luca Signorelli, c. 1493–1496

Camillo Vitelli (c. 1459 – May 1496) was an Italian knight and condottiero of the Vitelli family. He was born in Città di Castello as the son of Niccolò, making him brother to Paolo, Giulio, Giovanni and Vitellozzo. He was also brother-in-law to Giampaolo Baglioni. He became marquess of Sant'Angelo dei Lombardi and duke of Gravina in Puglia. In a battle near Lucera he became the first person to use an arquebus on horseback. He died in Circello and was the father of Vitello Vitelli, another condottiero.

== Bibliography (in Italian) ==
- Giulio Roscio, Ritratti et dogii di capitani illustri, che ne secoli moderni hanno gloriosamente guerreggiato, Roma, 1646
- Ariodante Fabretti, Cronaca della Città di Perugia dal 1309 al 1491, Nota col nome di Diario del Graziani, 1850.
