= Montone =

- Comune
- Comune di Montone
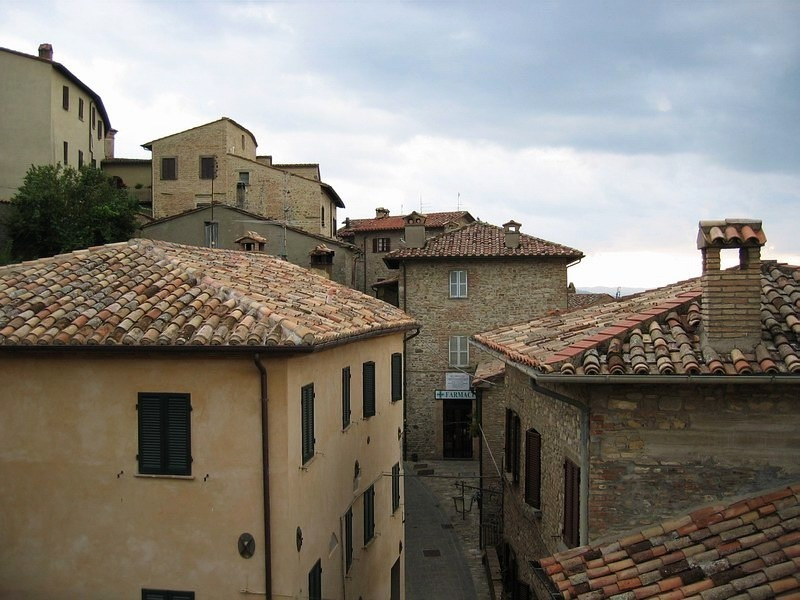
- View of Montone
- Coat of arms
- Location within Italy Location within Umbria
- Coordinates: 43.363941°N 12.326923°E
- Country: Italy
- Region: Umbria
- Province: Perugia (PG)
- Frazioni: Cárpini

Government
  - Mayor: Mirco Rinaldi

Area
  - Total: 50.8 km^{2} (19.6 sq mi)
- Elevation: 482 m (1,581 ft)

Population (1 January 2025)
  - Total: 1,537
  - Density: 30.3/km^{2} (78.4/sq mi)
- Demonym: Montonesi or Arietani
- Time zone: UTC+1 (CET)
  - Summer (DST): UTC+2 (CEST)
- Postal code: 06014
- Dialing code: 075
- Patron saint: St. Gregory
- Saint day: March 12
- Website: Official website

Montone is a comune (municipality) in the Province of Perugia in the Italian region Umbria, located about 35 km north of Perugia. It is one of I Borghi più belli d'Italia ("The most beautiful villages of Italy").

Montone is a walled medieval village with a small industrial and housing estate surrounding the walled town center. The town is the origin of the Fortebracci condottieri family, whose most famous member was Braccio da Montone.

== Etymology ==
According to Adone Palmieri, the name of Montone is derived from the Latin Aries. The name reflected the union of several earlier settlements into a single fortified site, including a Castello d'Arie.

== History ==
Montone likely originated in the 10th century, when its first documented existence is also recorded. Montone was an ancient fief of the marquises Del Monte.

By the mid-12th century it had developed into an autonomous community under the control of Perugia, governed by a general council and two consuls.

In the later medieval period, the town's history became closely tied to the fortunes of the Fortebracci family. The family, whose earliest known member is Ugolino (born around the 12th century), were aligned with the Guelph faction and maintained alliances with Perugia. They were opposed by the Olivi family of Montone, leaders of the Ghibelline party and supported by the Ubaldini della Corda.

In 1280 Fagiolo Olivi entered Montone by force, killing Fortebraccio Fortebracci along with members of his family, before being killed himself.

The period of greatest prominence of Montone came in the early 15th century under Braccio da Montone, a notable mercenary leader. On 28 August 1414, Montone was raised to the County of Montone by Antipope John XXIII and granted to Braccio and his heirs. In 1424 the title was renewed by Pope Martin V for Carlo, the son of Braccio.

In 1607 Montone was elevated to a marquisate under the Vitelli family, whose rule lasted until 1640.

During the French period the town formed part of the canton of Umbertide. It later returned to the rule of the Papal States, which continued until 1860, when Montone became part of the unified Kingdom of Italy.

In 1895 Montone had a population of 2,364 inhabitants.

== Geography ==
Montone lies about 4 miles (6.4 km) from Umbertide. The town occupies two elevations, one of which is crowned by the collegiate church of Santa Maria, built on the remains of an earlier fortification. Between the two hills lies the central square, surrounded by buildings enclosed within walls.

The slopes of the hills are watered by the Tiber, Carpina and Rio. Sulphurous waters rise near the locality of Carpini.

=== Subdivisions ===
The municipality includes the localities of Carpini, Chiesa Corlo, Montone, Piano, Santa Maria Disette.

In 2021, 713 people lived in rural dispersed dwellings not assigned to any named locality. At the time, the most populous localities were Montone proper (589), and Santa Maria Disette (207).

== Economy ==
In the 19th century agriculture was described as flourishing in the territory, alongside sericulture.

== Religion and culture ==
=== San Francesco ===
The church of San Francesco was rebuilt at the end of the 14th century. Its entrance portal was carved in 1519 by Antonio Bencivenni. Inside is a painted banner created by Bonfigli and dated 1482, depicting Christ between two angels, the Virgin sheltering devotees beneath her mantle, and various saints, with a view of Montone below. The stone altar is finely worked and gilded. A magistrate's bench in intarsia dating to 1505 is preserved within the church. Decorative elements include sculpted stone bearing the emblem of the Fortebraccio family.

=== Other religious buildings ===
The church of San Fedele contains a painting of the Holy Family, copied from Poussin, and an altarpiece of the Annunciation by Tommaso da Cortona and Vittore Cirello.

In the church of the Sacramento, the high altar features a panel of the Last Supper painted in 1611 by Calvart. The sacristy preserves a finely worked chalice dated 1549.

Montone also includes the collegiate church of Santa Maria and San Gregorio.

The town's patron saints are Saint Roch and the Holy Thorn, whose festivals are celebrated on 16 August and on the second day of Easter.

=== Rocca d'Aries ===
The Rocca d'Aries was built by the Fortebracci family on the remains of an earlier fortification. Over time it followed the broader historical fortunes of Montone, functioning across the centuries both as a defensive stronghold and as a residence, though from the 16th century it became independent of the town.

The building has a rectangular plan with a circular tower on one side. It has undergone various alterations to make it suitable for habitation, while still preserving the imposing mass of its fortified structure. The site is documented from as early as the year 1000, but from 1376 its history becomes closely tied to the Fortebracci: in that year Oddo III, father of Braccio da Montone, captured it and brought it back under the influence of nearby Città di Castello. Soon afterward Perugian magistrates regained possession and decided to make the rocca substantially more massive and difficult to take; they entrusted the direction of the work to Oddo III Fortebracci. By 1380 the enlarged structure was completed, and in the years that followed it was repeatedly contested between Perugia and Città di Castello.

In the 15th century it became a possession of Braccio Fortebracci, by then dominant over much of Umbria, and his family often stayed there, especially his wife, Nicola Varano. In the 16th century ownership passed to the Bentivoglio family. Later records mention an attack in 1596, when 600 bandits assaulted the fortress during a period of widespread banditry in the Gubbio area. Ownership then changed again: it was sold by the Bentivoglio to Count Giambattista Cantalmaggi for 15,000 Roman scudi, and subsequently passed by inheritance rights to the Della Porta family. In the 1980s it still belonged to the Della Porta when it was purchased by the Region of Umbria.
