= Troilo I de' Rossi =

Italian mercenary (1462–1521)

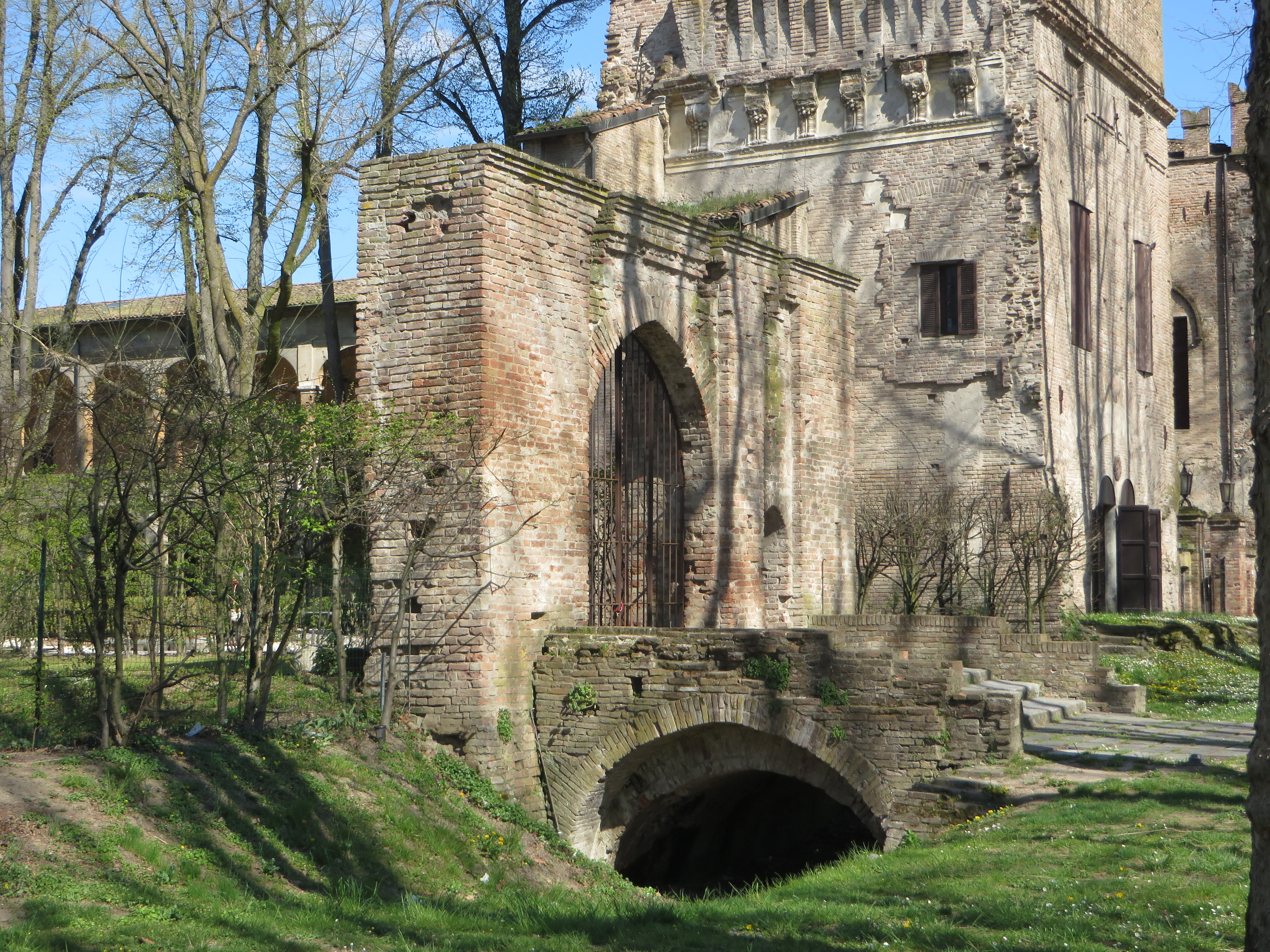
Rocca dei Rossi in San Secondo Parmense, which Troilo I had rebuilt

Troilo I de' Rossi (c. 1462 - 3 June 1521) was an Italian condottiero and the first marquess of San Secondo.

== Life ==
A son of Giovanni Rossi "il Diseredato" and Angela Scotti Douglas, he was born in San Secondo. He took part in French King Louis XII's conquest of the duchy of Milan in 1500, during which many lands taken from his grandfather by Ludovico Sforza ("il Moro") and ending up in the hands of members of the Sforza family were restored to him. However, it proved impossible to restore to him all the lands his family had controlled in the time of Pier Maria II and it was possibly as compensation for this fact that Louis made him marquess of San Secondo on 15 August 1502. Louis also made him a senator of Milan in 1505 and allowed him to accept the inheritance left him by his uncle Bertrando in 1502 in return for a payment of 8000 florins and the promise never to rehabilitate his cousin Filippo Maria, Troilo's bitter rival and the designated heir of Pier Maria II.

He restored the Rocca dei Rossi at San Secondo, rebuilding its bastions and towers, which had been demolished during the war with the Sforza, and expanding the defensive perimeter. He died there in June 1521, leaving the marquisate weak - his heirs were still in their minority and so the Rossi of Corniglio tried to take advantage of the situation with a force led by Filippo Maria and Bernardo, descendants of Guido de' Rossi, the son Pier Maria II had chosen to succeed himself.

== Marriage and issue ==
In 1503 he married countess Bianca Riario, daughter of Girolamo Riario, lord of Imola and sister of Giovanni dalle Bande Nere, pope Sixtus IV's nephew and pope Julius II's cousin. They had nine children:

- Costanza (1503–?), married Girolamo degli Albizzi di Firenze;
- Pietro Maria (1504–1547), 2nd marquess of San Secondo, married Camilla Gonzaga, daughter of Giovanni Gonzaga, lord of Vescovato;
- Gian Girolamo (1505–1564), bishop of Pavia;
- Angela (1506–1573), married Vitello Vitelli and later Alessandro Vitelli;
- Bertrando (1508–1527), soldier in the army of Charles V, Holy Roman Emperor;
- Alessandro (1512-?), deaf and dumb, soldier;
- Ettore (1515–1555), apostolic protonotary
- Camilla (1516–1543), married Girolamo Pallavicino, marquess of Cortemaggiore;
- Giulio Cesare (1519–1554), married Maddalena Sanseverino (?-1551), countess of Cajazzo and Colorno, daughter of Roberto Ambrogio Sanseverino, count of Cajazzo.
