= Vitello (disambiguation) =

Vitello (fl. c. 1270–1285) was a Polish friar, theologian and natural philosopher.

Vitello may also refer to:

- Vitello (crater), an impact crater on the Moon
- Vitello tonnato, an Italian veal dish
- Vitello (film), a 2018 British-Danish animated family comedy-drama film

== People with the name ==
- Vitello Vitelli (1480–1528), Italian knight and condottiero
- Caleb Vitello, American government official
- Fausto Vitello (1946–2006), American businessman and magazine publisher
- Paul Vitello, American journalist
- Tony Vitello (born 1978), American college baseball player and coach

== See also ==
- Vitelli, a prominent family of Umbria
