= François de Hangest, Seigneur de Genlis =

16th c. French military commander

François II de Hangest, Seigneur de Genlis, bailli & capitaine d'Évreux. (born unknown, died 1569) was a French military commander, notable for his roles during the French Wars of Religion.
In historic texts, he is often named simply Genlis or Jenlis. Such texts often do not mention his death, in 1569, and continue to use the same name to mean his younger brother Jean de Hangest, seigneur d'Yvoy.

== Family ==
Although many texts mention fewer brothers, his parents, Adrien de Hangest and Françoise du Mas (daughter of Sr de l’Ille-Bannejon), had five sons:

1. Jean, who became Bishop of Noyon in 1532 and died in 1577.
2. François, seigneur de Genlis.
3. Claude, who became Abbot of Saint-Eloi de Noyon. John Calvin dedicated his first published work, the Seneca Commentary, to Claude.
4. Louis, sometimes referred to as Young Genlis (French: Jeune Genlis), who distinguished himself at the Battle of Ceresole and died defending the town of Chalons in 1544
5. Jean, seigneur d'Yvoy, who as a Protestant became a principal lieutenant of Admiral de Coligny, in 1562 defended for 20 days but lost the town of Bourges.

None of the brothers had children.

During their youth, John Calvin often visited the Chateau of Genlis and the brothers. (Chateau de Montmort)

== Military career ==
Like his father, François had a military career, initially in service of King Henry II of France. 14 April 1543 he was appointed Captain of the Louvre. In 1560, King François II made Genlis a knight of the order of Saint-Michel, along with Crevecoeur and d’Humieres. In October 1557, the Spanish occupied Chauny. In a battle nearby, along with the French garrison of La Fère, Genlis commanded a cavalry company against the Spanish.

After converting to Calvinism, Genlis became Colonel-General for the Protestant “parti des religionaires”, which his brother Jean, seigneur d'Yvoy, also joined. At the Battle of Saint-Denis (10 November 1567), Genlis commanded the right wing of the Protestant army and led a cavalry charge.

Also in 1567, he took the towns of Bray (with a ransom of 10,000 ecus), Chauny, Courcy, Vailly and Bruyères, then with the support of Bouchavesnes, the towns of Harccourt and Crecy. 27 September 1567, he sacked Soissons.

In 1568, Genlis raised a dozen cornetts of cavalry and 2,000 harquebusiers to join the Prince of Orange in the Battle of le Quesnoy.

Genlis died in 1569. Most texts repeat the line that he probably died in Strasbourg of “la rage” which today would translate as of rabies, but it could mean in despair as he had gone badly into debt funding that last unsuccessful military campaign. Other texts state that he contracted a hot fever during a siege and died on 14 February 1569 at Chateau de Besarbre or Bergzabern Palace, which belonged to Wolfgang, the Duc de Deux-Ponts, Count Palatine of Zweibrücken.

== Aftermath ==
After the death of François, the family was heavily in debt, and they had to sell the lands and title to Pierre Brûlart.

Jean de Hangest, seigneur d'Yvoy, the youngest brother used the name Genlis until his death in 1572.
