= Paolo Vitelli =

Paolo Vitelli may refer to:

- Paolo Vitelli (condottiero) (1461–1499), lord of Montone
- Paolo II Vitelli (1519–1574), marquess of Cetona and Carmiano
- Paolo Vitelli (businessman) (1947–2024), Italian entrepreneur
