= Vitelli family =

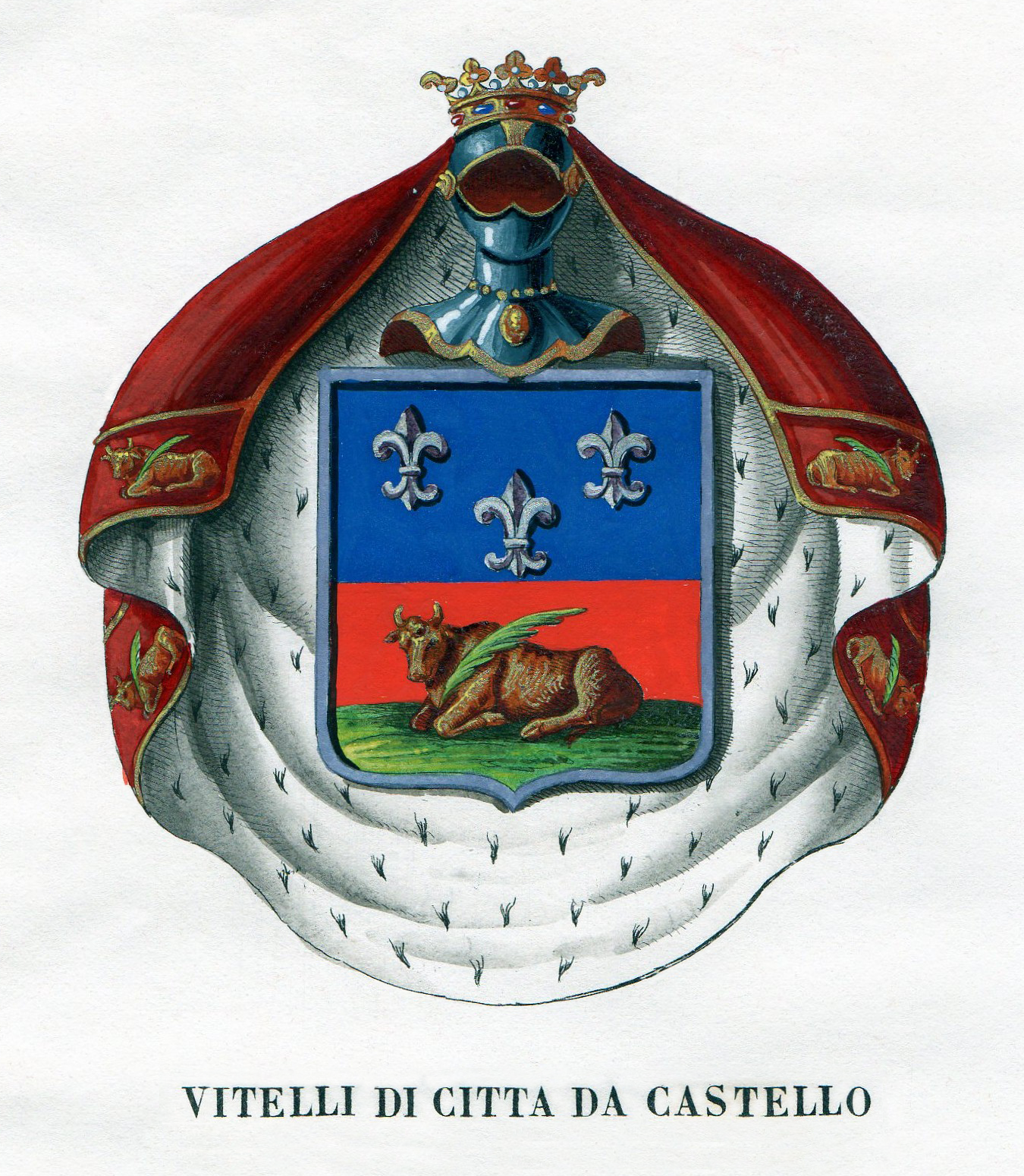
Coat of arms of Vitelli family

The House of Vitelli, among other families so named, were a prominent noble family of Umbria, rulers of Città di Castello and lesser rocche.

== History ==
In spite of ambitious genealogies, there is no demonstrable connection with the ancient Roman Vitellius (gens). The Vitelli had been rich merchants of Città di Castello, who made themselves masters of the town in the early fourteenth century, after civic confrontations with the rival Guelf faction of the Brancaleone, and henceforward wielded political and military influence disproportionate to their small territory, as supporters of the Papacy.

== Members of the historic family ==
- Giovan Luigi "Chiappino" Vitelli (1519–1575), soldier.
- Francesco Vitelli (1586–1646), Roman Catholic ecclesiastic.
- Niccolò Vitelli (1414–1486), condottiero.
- Vitellozzo Vitelli (c. 1458–1502), condottiero.
- Paolo Vitelli (condottiero), lord of Montone.
- Paolo II Vitelli, marquess of Cetona and Carmiano.
- Giovan Paolo Vitelli, known as Giovanni (died 1512).

There is a Palazzo Vitelli in many towns of Central Italy, notably the three in Città di Castello, where in addition to Palazzo Vitelli a Sant'Egidio, Palazzo Vitelli a San Giacomo (Palazzo Vitelli in Piazza), stands at the heart of the city. The 16th-century Palazzo Vitelli alla Cannoniera now houses an art gallery.

In other comuni and cities:

- Cetona: Palazzo Vitelli, built for Marchese Giovan Luigi "Chiappino" Vitelli
- Pisa
- Rome: Palazzo Vitelli in Campo Marzio
