= Portrait of Camilla Gonzaga and Her Three Sons =

Painting by Parmigianino

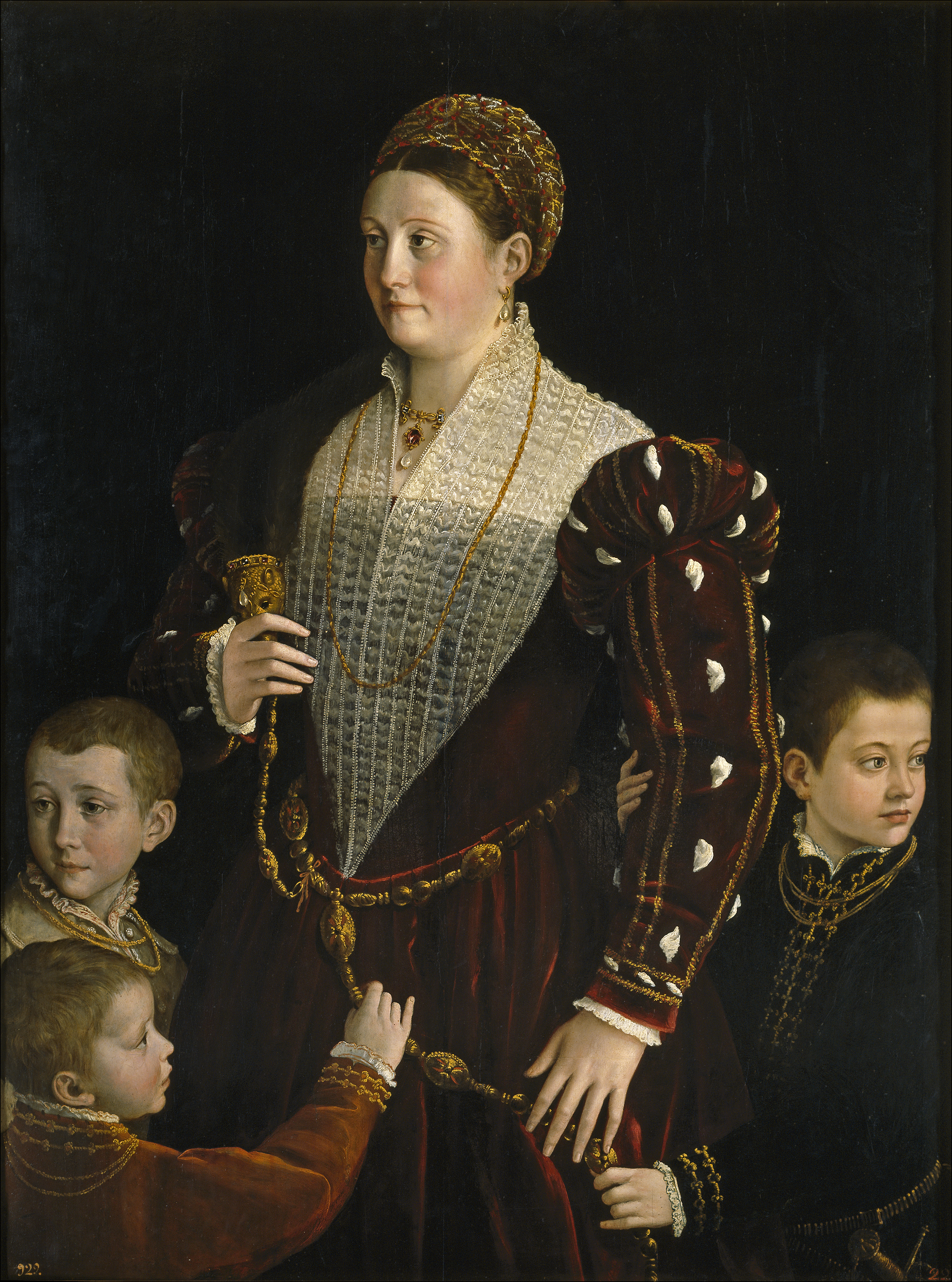
- Artist: Parmigianino and workshop
- Year: c. 1539-1540
- Medium: Oil on panel
- Dimensions: 128 cm × 97 cm (50 in × 38 in)
- Location: Museo del Prado, Madrid

Portrait of Camilla Gonzaga and Her Three Sons is a painting attributed to the Italian Mannerist artist Parmigianino and his workshop, executed c. 1539-1540. It is housed in the Museo del Prado, in Madrid. It forms a pair with another painting in the Prado, the Portrait of Pier Maria Rossi di San Secondo, Camilla's husband, a painting which is unanimously assigned to Parmigianino.

== History ==
It is mentioned in a 1686 inventory of the collections of the Royal Alcazar of Madrid, as the wife of the count of San Sigundo. The subject has been identified with Camilla Gonzaga, wife of imperial general Pier Maria III de' Rossi basing on this note, and by another from 1630 by one of his descendants about the existence of a portrait of him by Parmigianino.

The painting arrived in Spain in 1664, after King Philip IV had supported to the Rossi family in a dispute with the Farnese of Parma about some territories. It has been dated from around 1539–1540, but the attribution to Parmigianino is controversial, the author having been identified also as an artist from Bronzino's workshop. It is possible that Parmigianino, who died in 1540, had not been able to finish the portrait, which was completed by another artist, perhaps basing on his sketch.

== Description ==
The countess is portrayed on a black background, wearing a precious scarlet dress, a frilled mousseline on the chest, and rich set of jewels. She looks to the right, ideally towards the portrait of her husband. The countess is surrounded by her three sons, Troilo, Federico and Ippolito. It is the first case in Italian art in which this iconography was used.

The three sons appear to be from different hands, and were perhaps added in different moments.

== See also ==
- Portrait of Pier Maria Rossi di San Secondo

== Sources ==
- de Castris, Pierluigi Leone (2003). Parmigianino e il manierismo europeo. Cinisello Balsamo: Silvana editoriale. pp. 236–237. ISBN 88-8215-481-5.
