= Portrait of Niccolò Vitelli =

Painting by Luca Signorelli

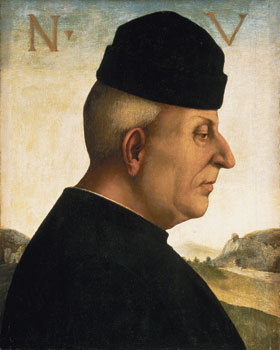
Portrait of Nicclò Vitelli (c. 1492–1496) by Luca Signorelli

Portrait of Niccolò Vitelli is an oil on panel portrait painting by Luca Signorelli, created c. 1492–1496, now in the Barber Institute of Fine Arts. It forms a diptych with the same artist's Portrait of Vitellozzo Vitelli, which shows Niccolò's son. Its subject had died by the time of its production and so it was probably produced after medals of him.

This painting was documented in the Doughty House Cook collection by the art historian and owner Herbert Cook in 1914, and it was one of the first paintings to be sold from that collection in 1945, whereupon it entered the museum.
