= Genlis =

Genlis may refer to:

== Places ==
- Genlis Côte-d'Or, a town in France
- Canton of Genlis, Côte-d'Or
- Genlis, former name of Villequier-Aumont, Aisne; seat of a marquisate

== People ==
- Stéphanie Félicité, comtesse de Genlis, French writer
- Francois de Hangest Sieur de Genlis & d'Abbecourt, French military commander, known as simply Genlis
- Jean de Hangest, seigneur d'Yvoy, Huguenot military commander during the French Wars of Religion, also known as Genlis after the death of his brother Francois
