= Portrait of Vitellozzo Vitelli =

Painting by Luca Signorelli

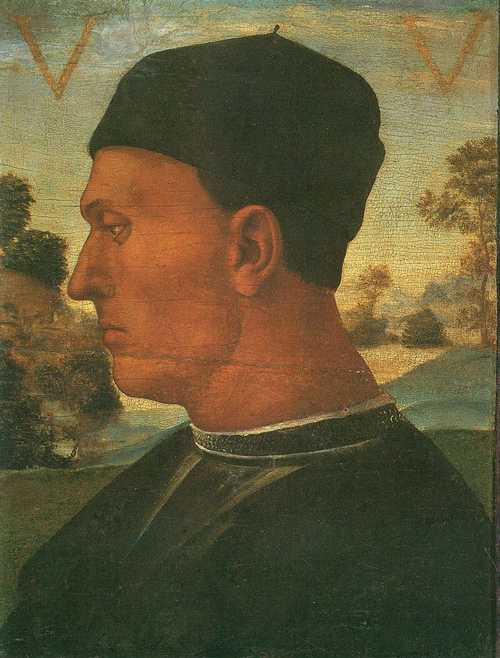
Portrait of Vitellozzo Vitelli (c. 1492–1496) by Luca Signorelli

Portrait of Vitellozzo Vitelli is an oil on panel painting by Luca Signorelli, created c. 1492–1496, now in the Berenson Collection at Villa I Tatti in Settignano (Firenze). It forms a kind of diptych with the same artist's Portrait of Niccolò Vitelli (Barber Institute of Fine Arts), Vitellozzo Vitelli's father - both were produced during the painter's stay in Florence from 1492 to 1496.
