= Siege of Mons (1572) =

Siege during the Eighty Years' War and the Anglo-Spanish War

Coordinates: 50°27′N 3°57′E

- Part of the Eighty Years' War
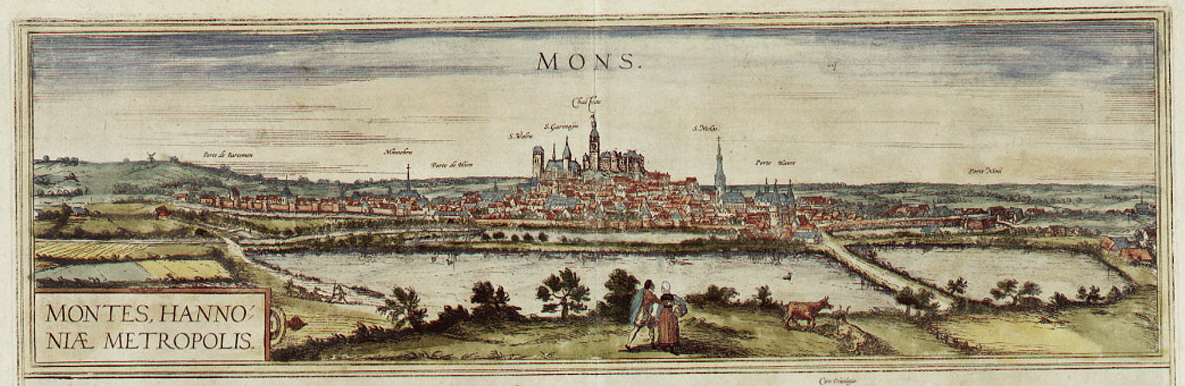
- Mons in 1572 by Frans Hogenberg
Date	23 June – 19 September 1572
Location	Mons, Hainaut, Spanish Netherlands
Result	Spanish victory: Valenciennes recaptured by the Spanish forces; Huguenot army destroyed; William the Silent's army defeated and disbanded; Louis of Nassau's forces at Mons capitulated on 19 September

Belligerents
Dutch rebels: Huguenots	Spain

Commanders and leaders
William the Silent; Louis of Nassau; Jean de Hangest, seigneur d'Yvoy (POW)	(Spain) Fernando Álvarez de Toledo, 3rd Duke of Alba (Spain) Fadrique Álvarez de Toledo, 4th Duke of Alba (Spain) Julián Romero (Spain) Chiappino Vitelli

Strength
Louis of Nassau: 6,000–6,500 men Jean de Hangest, seigneur d'Yvoy: 10,000 men William the Silent, Prince of Orange: 14,000 infantry and 3,000 cavalry	8,500; 36 cannons

The siege of Mons of 1572 took place at Mons, capital of the County of Hainaut, Spanish Netherlands (present-day Belgium), between 23 June and 19 September 1572, as part of the Eighty Years' War and the French Wars of Religion. In the spring of 1572, after the capture of Valenciennes by a Protestant force under Louis of Nassau, the Dutch commander continued with his offensive and took Mons by surprise on 24 May. After three months of siege, and the defeats of the armies of Jean de Hangest, seigneur d'Yvoy and Genlis, and William the Silent, Prince of Orange (Dutch: Willem van Oranje), by the Spanish army led by Don Fernando Álvarez de Toledo, 3rd Duke of Alba ("The Iron Duke"), Governor-General of the Spanish Netherlands, and his son, Don Fadrique Álvarez de Toledo, 4th Duke of Alba, Louis of Nassau's forces, isolated and without any hope of help, surrendered Mons to the Duke of Alba on 19 September. Without French assistance, William of Orange, leading a German mercenary army to aid his brother, was driven back into Germany; the garrison of Mons was thus cut off and – eventually – forced to accept the terms.

== Background ==
In early May 1572 Louis of Nassau, one of the major commanders of the Dutch rebel forces, encouraged by the victory at Brielle by the Sea Beggars (1 April), and supported by the Huguenot leader Gaspard II de Coligny, invaded the Spanish Netherlands with an army composed by German, English, Scottish, and French soldiers, and took Valenciennes on 21 May. On 23 May Louis of Nassau arrived at Mons with 1,000 infantry and 500 cavalry, who encamped in the environs of the city. At the next day, after finding out the schedules of opening of the doors of Mons, Nassau entered the city by surprise with the cavalry, and then the rest of his forces, defeating the small Spanish garrison. Louis took control of the city, and a few days later, was reinforced by about 4,500 infantry and cavalry under the command of the Gabriel de Lorges, Count of Montgomery.

When the news reached the Spanish headquarters, Don Fernando Álvarez de Toledo, Duke of Alba, Governor-General of the Spanish Netherlands, and commander-in-chief of the Spanish forces in the Low Countries, sent his son Don Fadrique Álvarez de Toledo, 4th Duke of Alba with 4,000 soldiers (another 16,000 soldiers were coming from the north), along with the maestre de campo Chiappino Vitelli, to defeat Louis of Nassau and retrieve Mons. On 23 June Fadrique's forces arrived at Mons and laid siege to the city. Furthermore, in early June, the Duke of Alba, at the head of the bulk of the Spanish army, recaptured Valenciennes after a feeble defence of the Protestant garrison, depriving the rebels, and their French allies, of one of their main bases.

Meanwhile, William the Silent had recruited in Germany an army of 14,000 soldiers of infantry and 3,000 of cavalry (11,000 infantry and 6,000 cavalry according to other sources), and on 7 July William crossed the Rhine, entering the Netherlands.

== Siege ==
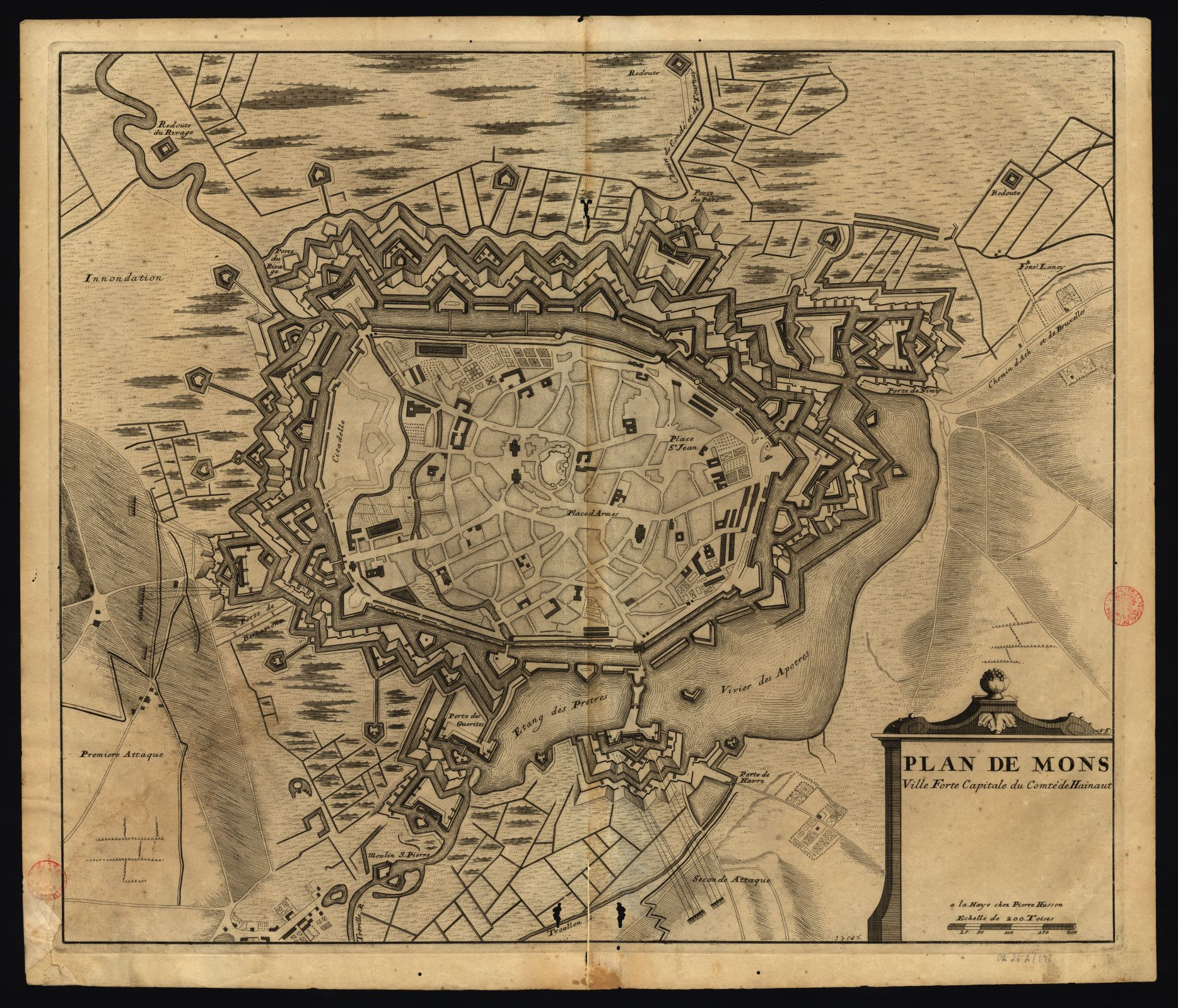
Old map of the fortress-city of Mons

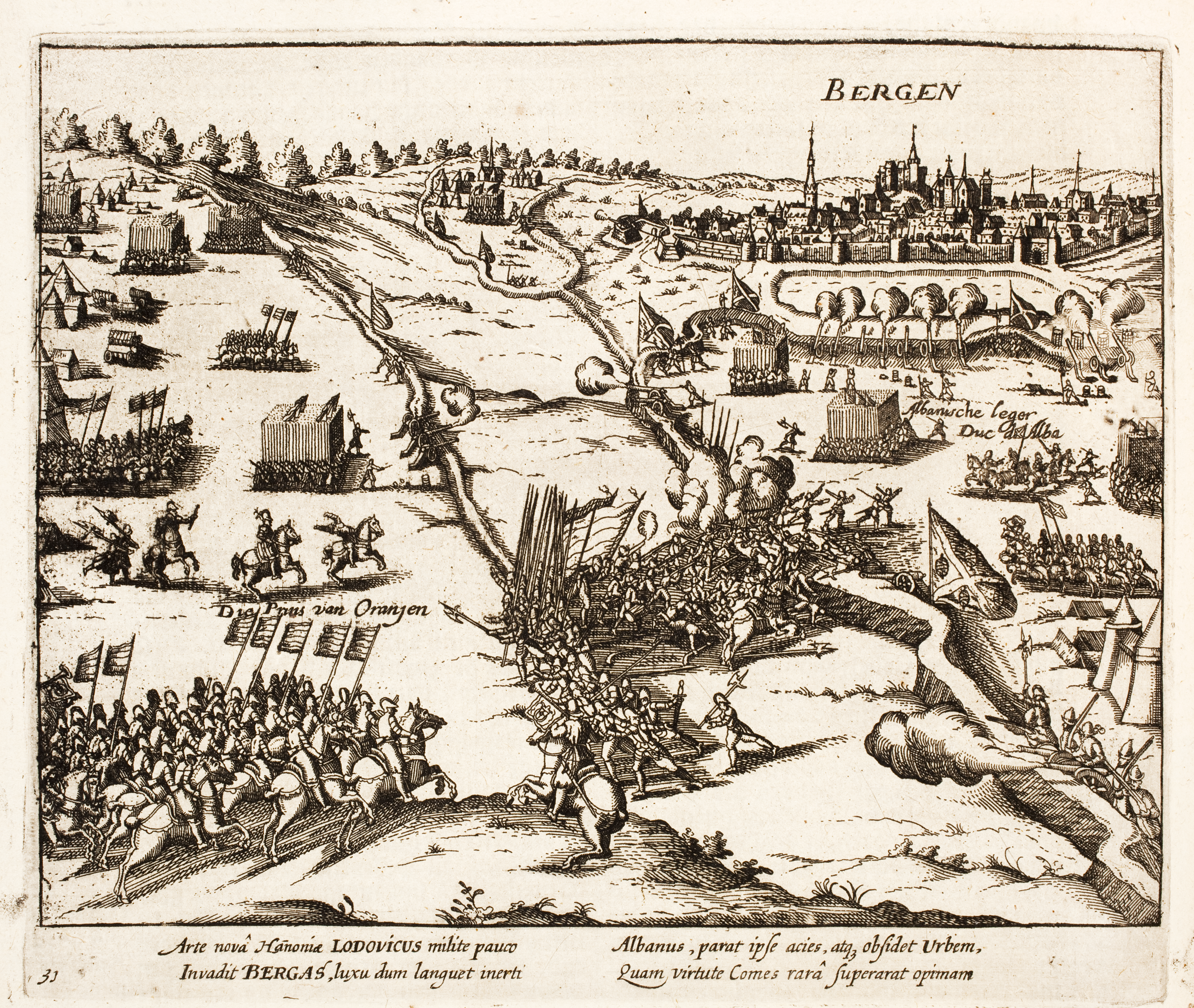
Siege of Mons by Fernando Álvarez de Toledo, Duke of Alba, 1572 – Bor Nederlantsche Oorloghen

Louis of Nassau, aware of the progress of his brother, sent Jean de Hangest, seigneur d'Yvoy to France for more reinforcements, and in mid-July, Genlis, with an army of 10,000 men, crossed the border again and marched towards Mons. Louis sent a message to Jean de Hangest, seigneur d'Yvoy, urging that he should join with the army of his brother, William of Orange, but Jean de Hangest, seigneur d'Yvoy ignored the message, and advanced against the Spaniards.

=== Battle of Saint-Ghislain ===
On 19 July Jean de Hangest, seigneur d'Yvoy and his forces encamped near Mons, in a circular plain. Don Fadrique, aware of his arrival, advanced towards him with 4,000 infantry, 1,500 cavalry, and 3,000 armed villagers for the occasion. Jean de Hangest, seigneur d'Yvoy sent a detachment to reconnoitre, but after seeing the advance of the Spanish forces, these troops retreated to the French camp at full speed. "Don Frederic de Toledo is coming upon us", they cried. The Spanish cavalry of Philip of Noircarmes, without delay, charged against the French army, followed by infantry, while the rear was protected by the cavalry of Don Bernardino de Mendoza. The attack caused panic among the French Huguenots, and then, the Spanish infantry shattered the French army. The Spanish victory was complete, and the army of Jean de Hangest, seigneur d'Yvoy was entirely routed. About 2,000 French soldiers were killed or wounded, and 700 captured, including 70 nobles and officers (in the following days, more than 4,000 were captured). The leader of the French army, Jean de Hangest, seigneur d'Yvoy, was also captured, and taken prisoner to Antwerp. The Captain Francisco Arias de Bobadilla was honored with carrying the news of the victory to King Philip II, for the proven value during the battle.

Meanwhile, the William the Silent with his new army continued to advance towards Mons. On 23 July, after the capture of Roermond, his troops mutinied. On 27 August, with guarantees of payment of some cities in Holland, crossed the Meuse, advancing over Diest, Termonde, Oudenaarde, and Nivelles.

=== St. Bartholomew's Day ===
On 11 August Gaspard II de Coligny, with the approval of King Charles IX, had written to the Prince, that he expected soon to begin his march towards the Netherlands. However, in France, Charles IX lost his nerve, fearing a Spanish invasion and a Catholic rebellion if he persisted in the planned invasion of the Netherlands to support the Huguenots and the Dutch Protestants. The result was St. Bartholomew's Day massacre on 23 August. When the news reached the Netherlands, it affected the morale of the Protestant troops (especially in the army of Louis of Nassau at Mons, because a great part of his troops were Huguenots), while in the Spanish camp it was celebrated by bonfires and illuminations, even in the Church of St. Michael and St. Gudula (now Brussels' cathedral), the Catholic population sang anthems in honor of "the most Christian King of France".

In early September, Don Fernando, Duke of Alba (who despite being a strong defender of Catholicism, described the massacre as an atrocity), arrived at Mons with reinforcements and took command of the operations. The Prince of Orange continued to advance through the Netherlands, and some cities and villages were forced to open the doors to his passage for fear (Alba was especially angry for this), although some, such as Leuven, prevented Orange's troops from entering the city, in exchange for supplies. On 10 September the army arrived near Mons, and Alba, knowing of Orange's arrival, positioned his troops for a possible attack.

=== William of Orange's army ===
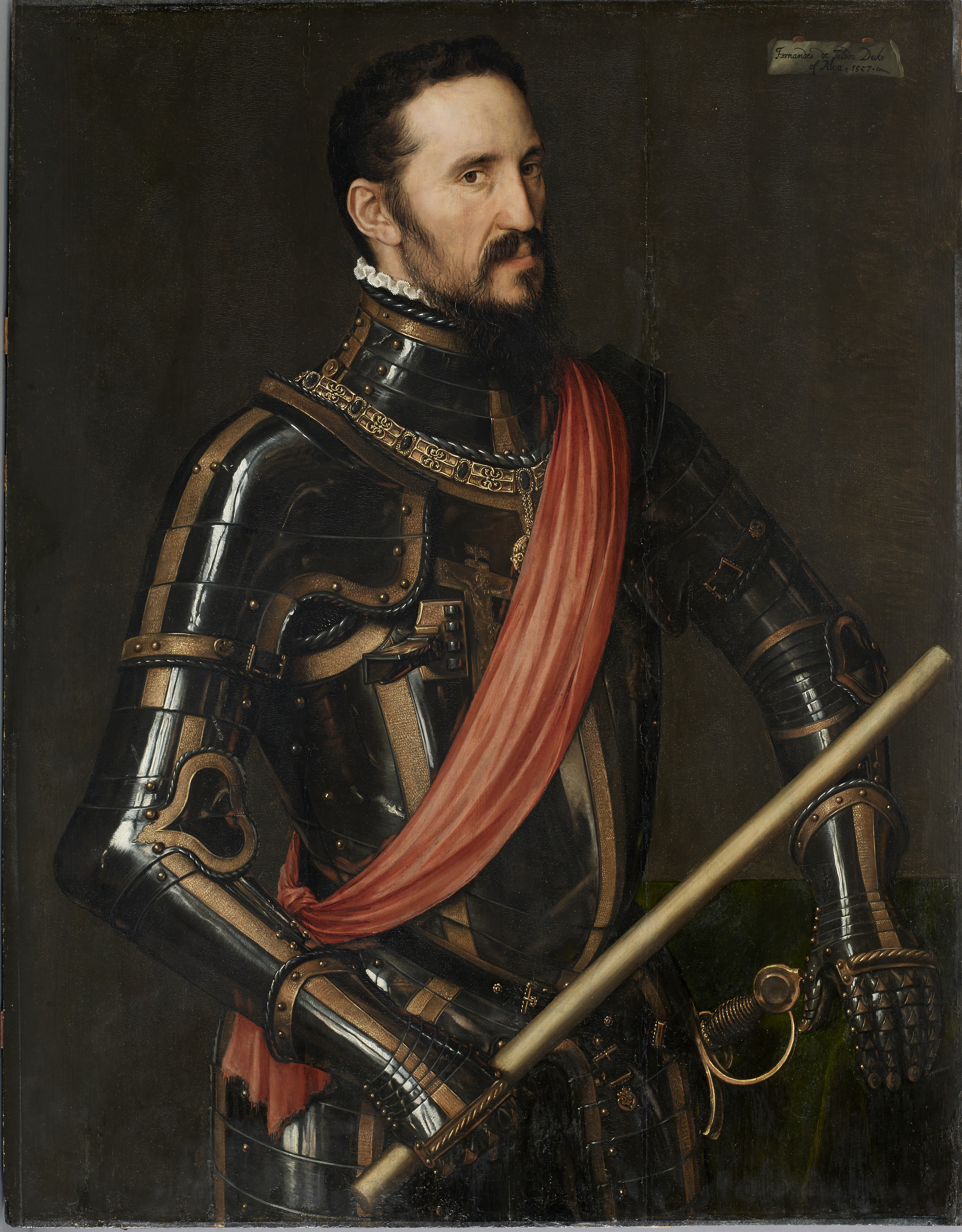
Don Fernando Álvarez de Toledo, 3rd Duke of Alba "The Iron Duke", by Antonis Mor

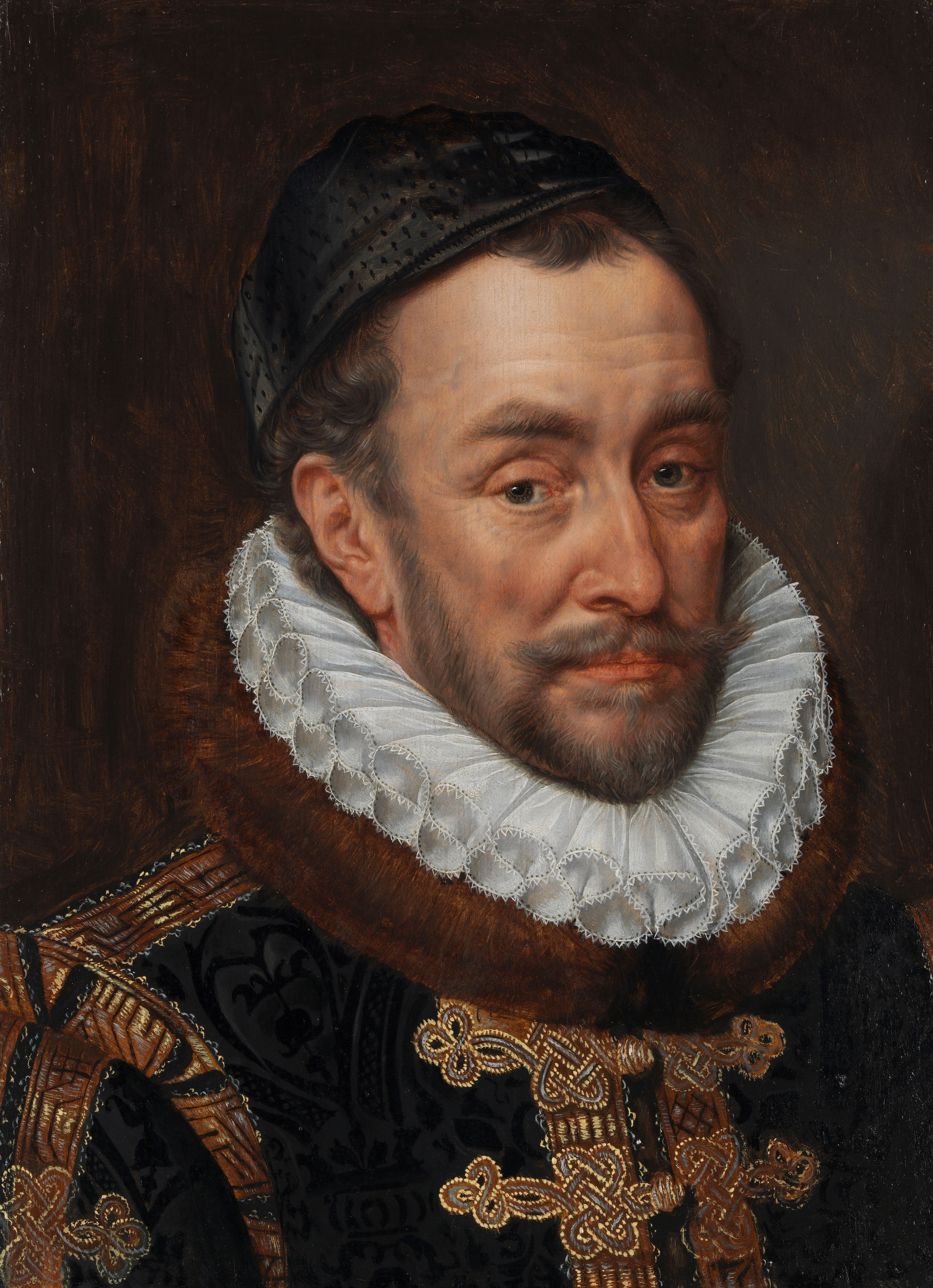
William the Silent, leader of the Dutch Revolt, by Adriaen Thomasz. Key

On the same day, as expected, Orange's cavalry attacked the flank of the Spanish army, but was repulsed by the Spanish arquebusiers, led in the first line by the Duke of Alba, his son Don Fadrique, and Juan de la Cerda, 4th Duke of Medinaceli, causing multiple casualties in Orange's cavalry. After the failed attack, the Prince retreated to the village of Harmignies, about a league from Mons.

On the night of 11 September, the Spanish commander, Maestre de Campo Julián Romero, entered the camp of William of Orange, commanding 600 arquebusiers, remaining as a reserve, in rear, the same number, supported by units of infantry and light cavalry, whose purpose was to protect the withdrawal. In this raid, 600 rebels were killed, for only 60 Spaniards. Hundreds of horses were captured, and a great part of the tents and the supplies were destroyed and burned. During the action, William of Orange himself was in profound slumber, and was saved by the barking of his Spaniel dog, who slept beside him.

With a heavy heart, William wrote to his brother Louis of his forlorn condition and inability to relieve Mons. The Prince retreated with his army to Nivelles and Mechelen, marching to the Rhine, and finally the bulk of his troops, mutinous for lack of pay, dispersed towards Germany. Thereafter he made his way almost alone to Holland, the only province which still remained true to him.

=== Surrender ===
After the defeat of the army of French Huguenots under Jean de Hangest, seigneur d'Yvoy, and the withdrawal of the army of William of Orange, Louis of Nassau found himself isolated in Mons. Even the French Huguenots under his command mutinied as a consequence of the support of the King of France for the St. Bartholomew’s Day massacre. On 19 September Louis of Nassau surrendered Mons to the Duke of Alba and the terms of the capitulation were agreed between the Dutch and the Spaniards.

== Immediate consequences ==
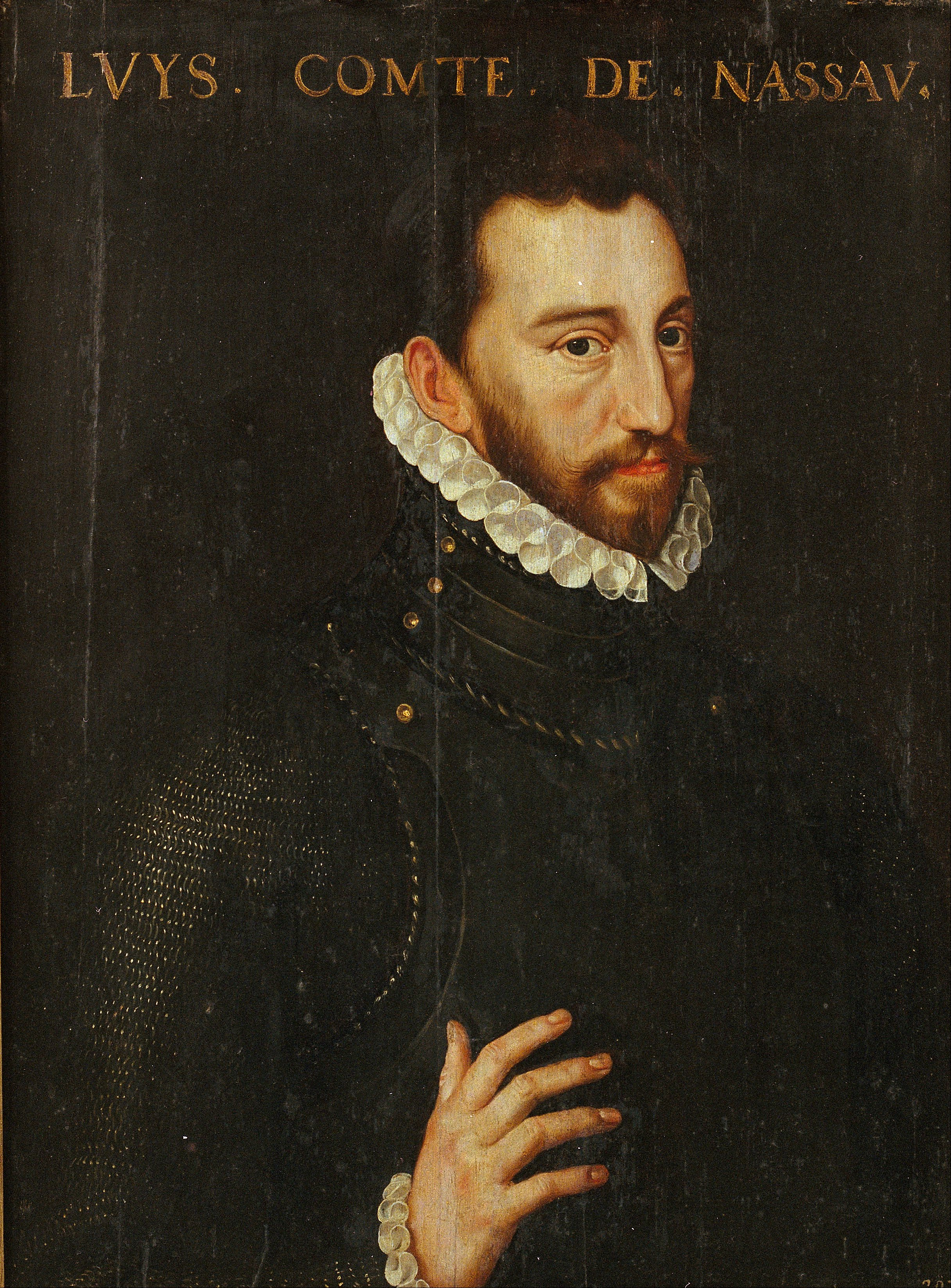
Portrait of Louis of Nassau by Adriaen Thomasz Key

Louis of Nassau would be received by the Duke of Alba, the Duke of Medinaceli, and Don Fadrique. The city would be evacuated on 21 September, and on 24 September the Duke of Alba entered Mons. Philip of Noircames, by his position as Governor of Hainaut, took command of the city.

All towns that had accepted the authority of Prince William of Orange, many for fear of reprisals, returned to allegiance to the Duke of Alba. However, Alba advanced over Mechelen, one of the cities that lent support to the Orange's army, and where the Prince had left a small garrison. In retaliation for the assistance provided by the city to the rebel army of William of Orange, and to satisfy the arrears of pay of the soldiers of the Spanish regiments, the Duke of Alba ordered the troops under the command of his son Don Fadrique to sack the city.

After dealing with Orange's threat in the south, Alba sent his son Don Fadrique to the two rebellious provinces Gelderland and Holland. Fadrique started his campaign by the capture of the fortress-city of Zutphen in Gelderland. On his way to Amsterdam, Don Fadrique came across Naarden, which surrendered on 22 November 1572.

== Long-term consequences ==
The loss of Mons proved irreversible. The Dutch Revolt never got another chance to rally the Walloon Protestants to its cause, which remained confined to the North. Nine years later, Mons became part of the staunchly Catholic Union of Arras which accepted Spanish rule, and Protestantism there was stamped out. Thus, the Dutch rebels losing the chance to gain Mons was an important step towards the division of what had been the single Habsburg Netherlands into two distinct entities - ultimately the present Netherlands and Belgium.

== See also ==
- Capture of Brielle
- St. Bartholomew's Day
- French Wars of Religion
- List of governors of the Spanish Netherlands

== Bibliography ==
- MacGregor, Mary. The Netherlands (Yesterday's Classics). First published in 2007. ISBN 1-59915-184-7
- Parker, Geoffrey. The Army of Flanders and the Spanish Road, 1567-1659. Cambridge. 1972. ISBN 0-521-83600-X
- Elliott, John Huxtable (2000). Europe Divided, 1559-1598. Oxford: Blackwell Publishing. ISBN 0-631-21780-0
- García Hernán, Enrique./Maffi, Davide. Guerra y Sociedad en la Monarquía Hispánica. Volume 1. Published 2007. ISBN 978-84-8483-224-9
- Duffy, Christopher (1996). Siege Warfare: Fortress in the Early Modern World, 1494–1660. Routledge and Kegan Paul.
- David J.B. Trim. The Huguenots: History and Memory in Transnational Context. 2011. ISBN 978-90-04-20775-2
- Israel, Jonathan (1995). The Dutch Republic: Its Rise, Greatness, and Fall 1477–1806. Oxford University Press. ISBN 0-19-873072-1
- Tracy, J.D. (2008). The Founding of the Dutch Republic: War, Finance, and Politics in Holland 1572–1588. Oxford University Press. ISBN 978-0-19-920911-8
- Jaques, Tony (2007). Dictionary of Battles and Sieges: A Guide to 8,500 Battles from Antiquity Through the Twenty-first Century. Greenwood Publishing Group. ISBN 978-0-313-33537-2
