= Bianca Riario =

Italian noble

- Marchioness of San Secondo; Countess of San Secondo; Regent of San Secondo
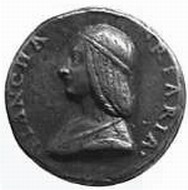
- Bronze medallion of Bianca Riario made by goldsmith Niccolò Fiorentino
- Born: March 1478; Rome, Italy
- Died: 1524; Florence, Italy
- Noble family: Riario; Sforza
- Spouses: Troilo I de' Rossi, 1st Marquis of San Secondo, 6th Count of San Secondo
- Issue: Costanza de' Rossi; Pier Maria III de' Rossi, 2nd Marquis of San Secondo, 7th Count of San Secondo; Giovan Girolamo de' Rossi, Bishop of Pavia; Angela de' Rossi; Bertrando de' Rossi; Alessandro de' Rossi; Ettore de' Rossi, Provost of San Secondo; Camilla de' Rossi; Giulio Cesare de' Rossi, Count of Cajazzo
- Father: Girolamo Riario
- Mother: Caterina Sforza, Lady of Imola, Countess of Forli

Bianca Riario (March 1478 – 1524) was an Italian noblewoman and regent, Marchioness of San Secondo by marriage to Troilo I de' Rossi, and regent of the marquisate and county of San Secondo for her son Pier Maria during his minority between 1521 and 1522. She was the eldest child and only daughter of Caterina Sforza by the latter's first husband, Girolamo Riario, a nephew of Pope Sixtus IV.

Bianca married twice; her first husband was Astorre III Manfredi, Lord of Faenza, and her second husband, Troilo I de' Rossi, 1st Marquis of San Secondo, 6th Count of San Secondo, by whom she had eight recorded children.

At the time, the de' Rossi was one of the most prestigious noble families in Parma.

Bianca was the half-sister of the celebrated condottiero Giovanni delle Bande Nere, to whom she acted as a substitute mother while their own mother, Caterina was held prisoner by Cesare Borgia.

== Early years ==
Bianca was born at the Palazzo Corsini in Rome, the eldest child and only daughter of Caterina Sforza and her first husband, Girolamo Riario. Her birth occurred some time in March 1478, although the exact date is unknown. Her paternal grandparents were Paolo Riario and Bianca della Rovere, sister of Pope Sixtus IV; however, it was rumoured that Girolamo's actual father was his uncle, Pope Sixtus. Her maternal grandparents were Galeazzo Maria Sforza, Duke of Milan, and his mistress Lucrezia Landriani.

Bianca had five younger brothers from her mother's marriage to her father, a half-brother, Bernardino from her mother's second marriage to Giacomo Feo, and another half-brother from her mother's third and final marriage to Giovanni de' Medici il Popolano. This brother became known as the condottiero Giovanni delle Bande Nere.

Bianca's early years were turbulent, marked by the violence, treachery, family rivalry amongst the city-states, and continuous warfare which were salient features of life in Renaissance Italy. In August 1484, in Rome, following the death of Pope Sixtus IV, the city was sacked by looters and malcontents. After her father's palace was ransacked and almost destroyed, Bianca, along with her mother and her brothers, sought refuge in the Castle of Sant'Angelo. Her mother immediately took command of the fortress, and began a siege in order to supervise the election of the new Pope, and coerce the Cardinals to negotiate with her. Caterina surrendered the fortress after Girolamo, who was Captain General of the Church, had taken a counterposition against her. Bianca and her family moved to Forlì and the Cardinals were able to meet in conclave.

Pope Sixtus's successor, Giovanni Battista Cybo, was not the preferred candidate of the Riarios, but instead, a long-standing opponent who took the name Innocent VIII.

On 14 April 1488, in Forlì, shortly after Bianca's tenth birthday, her father was stabbed to death inside the government palace, and his dead body was tossed from the palace into the square below where it was dragged through the streets by the citizens. His assassination was part of a conspiracy organised by members of the Orsi family over a financial dispute. After her father's palace was sacked, Bianca, her mother, and her brothers were immediately captured and taken prisoner. Their lives were constantly in peril, but the Riarios were eventually released after Ludovico Sforza, Duke of Milan, who was Caterina's uncle, came to their assistance. Bianca's stepfather Giacomo Feo also met his death by assassination, which Bianca witnessed with her own eyes. The year was 1495. Bianca had accompanied her mother, two of her brothers, Ottaviano and Cesare, and Giacomo on a hunting expedition. Upon their return, they were ambushed, and Giacomo was murdered by a group of assassins led by Gian Antonio Ghetti.

In 1500, Bianca's mother was taken prisoner by the ferocious Cesare Borgia, the same man who, one year later, deposed Bianca's first husband, Astorre III Manfredi, and arranged his murder in 1502. During her mother's imprisonment, Bianca sought refuge in a convent but soon left in order to care for her young half-brother, Giovanni. It was during this period that Bianca and her brother formed a close bond of love and affection for one another, which would never be severed.

== Marriage ==
Bianca was initially promised to marry at Astorre III Manfredi, Lord of Faenza when Astorre was still a child, but the marriage was canceled after some years. On an unknown date in 1503 at the Castle of Sant'Angelo, Bianca married Troilo I de' Rossi, 1st Marquis of San Secondo, and 6th Count of San Secondo. He was the son of Giovanni Rossi and Angela Scotti. He was created marquis by King Louis XII of France on 15 August 1502, in gratitude for his military services in the conquest of the Duchy of Milan. Upon her marriage, Bianca was styled as Marchioness of San Secondo and Countess of San Secondo.

Bianca went to live at the castle, Rocca dei Rossi in San Secondo (modern province of Parma).

== Regency ==
Upon the death of her husband on 3 June 1521, Bianca acted as regent of the marquisate and county of San Secondo for her son Pier Maria during his minority. Surrounded by hostile neighbours and numerous enemies which included relatives of her husband Troilo, she summoned the assistance of her half-brother, Giovanni dalle Bande Nere, who helped protect her own interests and those of her children.

Bianca and her family formed a close friendship with author and satirist Pietro Aretino.

She died on an unknown date after 1522, in Florence.

== Issue ==
Bianca was initially promised to marry to Astorre III Manfredi, Lord of Faenza, but marriage was canceled. Then she married Troilo I de' Rossi, 1st Marquis of San Secondo, 6th Count of San Secondo, by whom she had nine recorded children:

- Costanza (1503–?), married Girolamo degli Albizzi of Florence;
- Pietro Maria (1504–1547), 2nd Marquis of San Secondo, husband of Camilla Gonzaga, daughter of Giovanni Gonzaga Lord of Vescovato;
- Gian Girolamo (1505–1564), Bishop of Pavia;
- Angela (1506–1573), married Vitello Vitelli and, after his death, Alessandro Vitelli;
- Bertrando (1508–1527), served in the armies of Carlo V and killed in battle at Valmontone.;
- Alessandro (1512-?), a deaf-mute, soldier;
- Ettore (1515–1555), apostolic protonotary;
- Camilla (1516–1543), wife of Girolamo Pallavicino, Marquis of Cortemaggiore;
- Giulio Cesare (1519–1554), married Maddalena Sanseverino (?-1551) countess of Cajazzo and Colorno, daughter of Roberto Ambrogio Sanseverino, Count of Cajazzo.

== In art ==
A bronze medallion of Bianca was made by goldsmith Niccolò Fiorentino. It shows Bianca in profile; her hair is worn long, and is held in place by a jewelled headband. The medallion is on display at the Museo Civico Archeologico of Bologna.

== Ancestry ==
Ancestors of Bianca Riario

Bartolomeo Riario
Raffaele Riario
Paolo Riario
Girolamo Riario
Leonardo della Rovere
Bianca della Rovere
Luchina Monteleoni
Bianca Riario
Muzio Sforza
Francesco Sforza, Duke of Milan
Lucia da Torsano
Galeazzo Maria Sforza, Duke of Milan
Filippo Maria Visconti, Duke of Milan
Bianca Maria Visconti, Duchess of Milan
Agnese del Maino
Caterina Sforza
Landriani
Lucrezia Landriani
