= Paolo II Vitelli =

Paolo II Vitelli was an Italian condottiero and cavalryman. A member of the Vitelli family, he was born in Città di Castello and died in Parma. He was the son of Angela de' Rossi and her second husband Alessandro Vitelli.
