= Portrait of Pier Maria Rossi di San Secondo =

Painting by Parmigianino

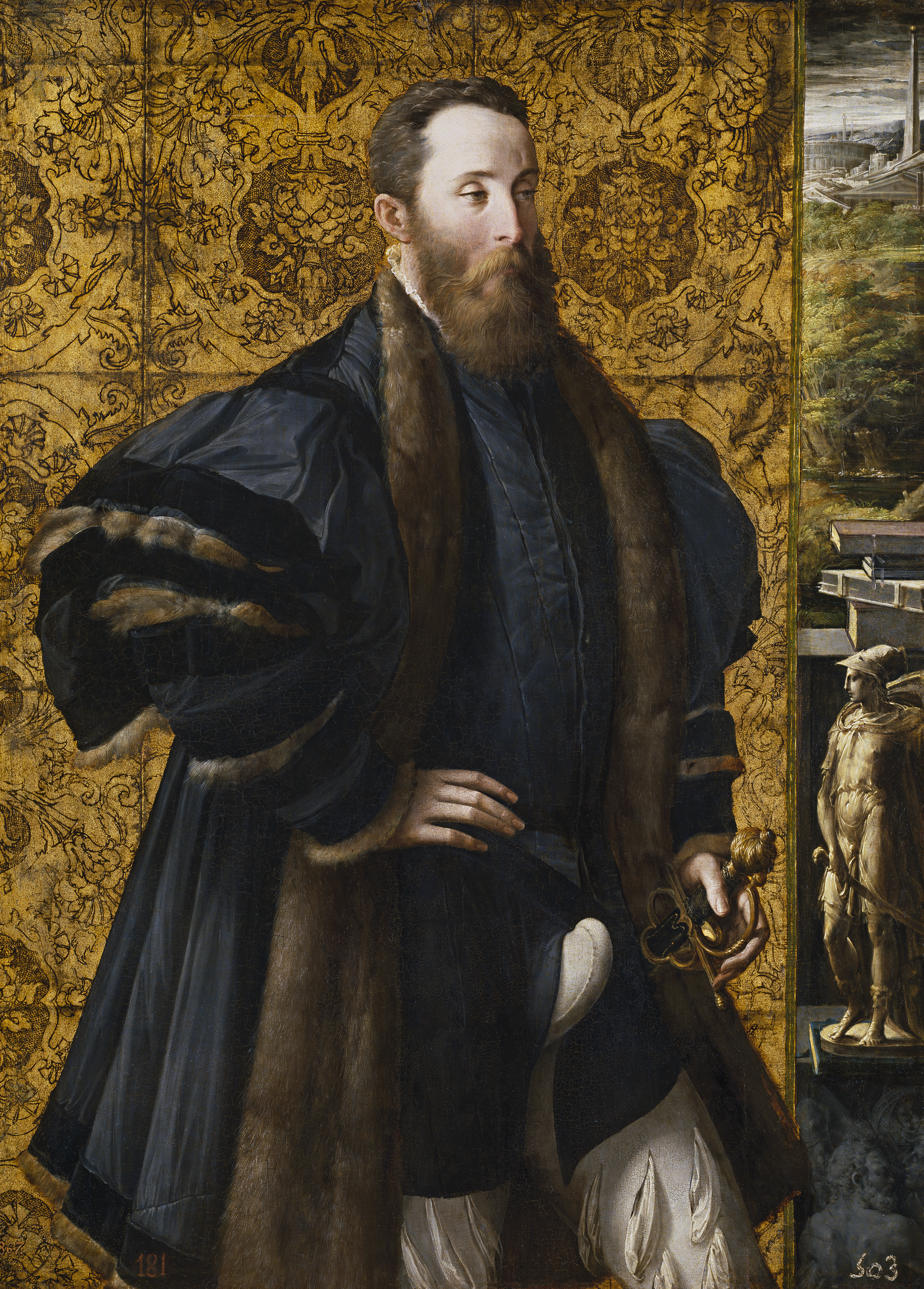
- Artist: Parmigianino
- Year: c. 1535–1538
- Medium: Oil on canvas
- Dimensions: 133 cm × 98 cm (52 in × 39 in)
- Location: Museo del Prado; Madrid

Portrait of Pier Maria Rossi di San Secondo is a painting by the Italian Mannerist artist Parmigianino, executed around 1535–1539 and housed in the Museo del Prado, Madrid, Spain. The subject was Count of San Secondo, and the painting forms a pair with a group portrait of his Countess and their children, Portrait of Camilla Gonzaga and Her Three Sons, although the latter is not unanimously attributed to Parmigianino.

== History ==
It is mentioned in a 1686 inventory of the collections of the Royal Alcazar of Madrid, as the portrait of count of San Sigundo. The subject has been identified with Pier Maria III de' Rossi basing on this note, and by another from 1630 by one of his descendants about the existence of a portrait of him by Parmigianino.

The painting arrived in Spain in 1664, after King Philip IV had supported the Rossi family in a dispute with the Farnese of Parma about some territories. It has been dated from around 1535 to 1539, based on the age of Pier Maria (born in 1508) in the portrait, and a statement by Parmigianino's contemporary, the art historian Giorgio Vasari, that the artist took refuge at Pier Maria's court in the period in question.

== Description ==
The count is portrayed standing in front of a precious damask cloth background. He wears a long and wide, fur-lined black jacket, a waistcoat in the same color, a white shirt and white trousers with contemporary "French" cuts and padded codpiece. His austere posture and the hand at the sword's hilt refer to Pier Maria's military career. He looks to the right, ideally towards his wife's portrait.

At the right is a landscape with a city rich of monuments, perhaps Rome. The objects are also references to the count's life and personal interests: a statue of Mars, the Roman war god, an ancient bas-relief (symbol of his collector attitude), and some books, hinting to his love for literature (he was in correspondence of poet Pietro Aretino). One of the books has the inscription "Imperio", referring to Pier Maria's commitment with emperor Charles V at the time in which the work was painted.

== See also ==
- Portrait of Camilla Gonzaga and Her Three Sons

== Sources ==
- de Castris, Pierluigi Leone (2003). Parmigianino e il manierismo europeo. Cinisello Balsamo: Silvana editoriale. pp. 236–237. ISBN 88-8215-481-5.
