= Chiappino Vitelli =

Italian nobleman and military leader

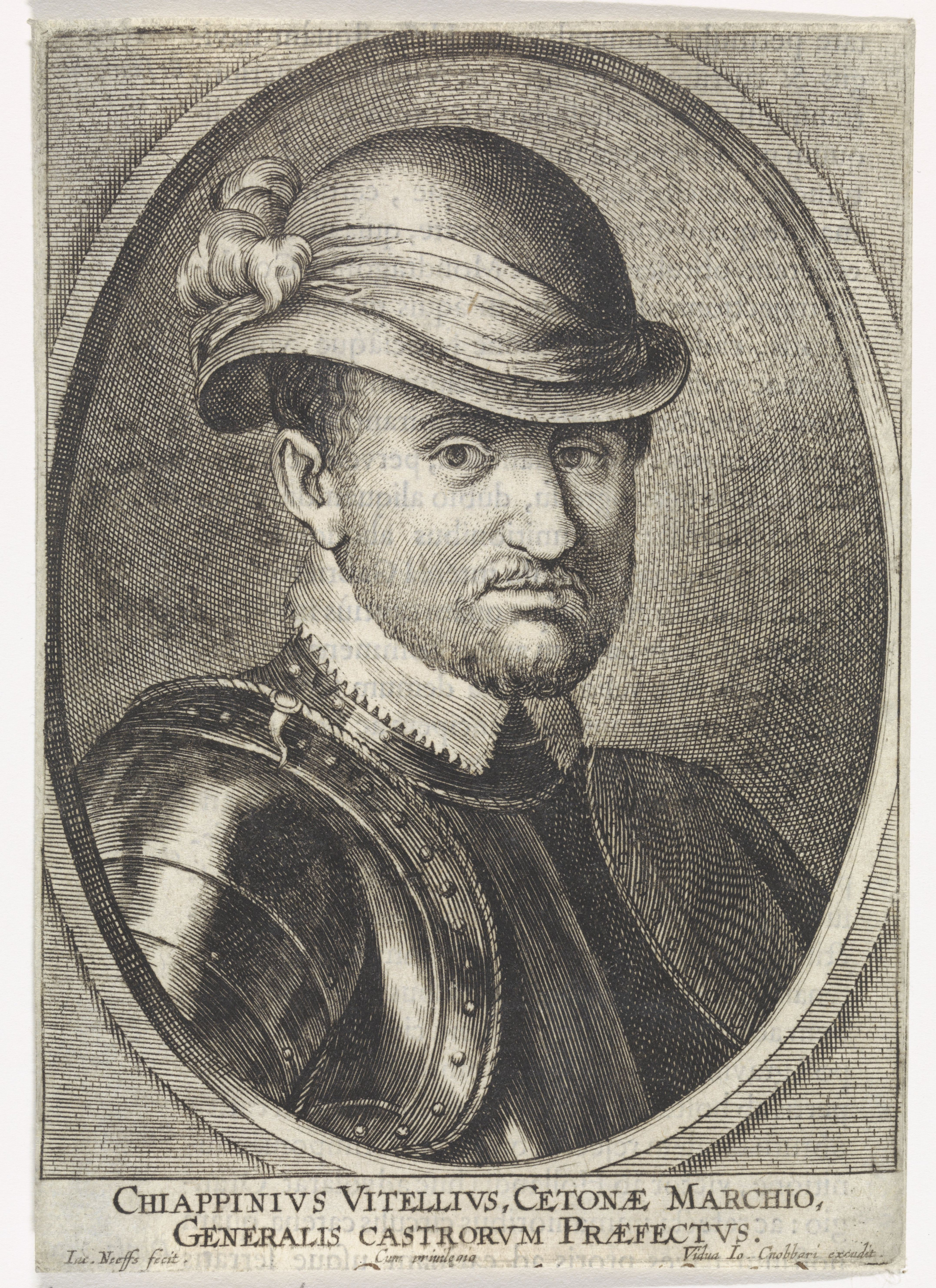
- Born: 1519; Città di Castello, Papal States
- Died: 1575 (aged 55–56); Antwerp, Spanish Netherlands
- Military career
- Allegiance: Spanish Empire
- Branch: Army
- Rank: Maestre de campo
- Conflicts: Italian War of 1542–1546; Ottoman–Habsburg wars; Capture of Mahdia; Conquest of Peñón de Vélez de la Gomera; Great Siege of Malta; Italian War of 1551–1559; Battle of Marciano; Eighty Years' War; Battle of Jodoigne; Siege of Mons; Siege of Haarlem

Giovan Luigi "Chiappino" Vitelli (1519 – July 1575) was an Italian nobleman and military leader who was Marquis of Cetona. He became a general and diplomat for Charles V, Holy Roman Emperor and stayed in the service of his son, Philip II of Spain, serving as Governor of Piombino and as Spanish ambassador to England. He was reputed to be one of the best Italian soldiers of his time, "the living embodiment... of the political and military success of ducal Florence".

== Biography ==
He was the son of Niccolò Vitelli, whom he avenged from his murder to along with his brother Paolo. As a youngster, he became a bodyguard, sparring partner and friend of the Duke of the Florentine Republic, Cosimo I de' Medici, who was close to him in age. He was nicknamed Chiappino ("Little Bear") for his large height and muscular build.

=== Italian Wars ===
Vitelli served as a captain under Cosimo I de' Medici in his wars to gain Florence, Siena and Montalcino, and was appointed governor of Piombino (1543). He joined the Italian Wars in the side of the House of Habsburg in 1544, participating in battles against the French and Ottomans led by Hayreddin Barbarossa. He failed to defend Talamona and Porto Ercole, but in turn repealed the Franco-Turk forces in Orbetello along with Stefano Colonna and the local Spanish tercios, defeating French mercenary general Leone Strozzi. Afterwards, he helped Viceroy Pedro de Toledo to drown a revolt in Naples, and also served in naval encounters under Andrea Doria against Dragut.

In 1553, Vitelli was in Corsica serving against Franco-Ottoman invasion, capturing the city of San Fiorenzo against the efforts of Sampiero Corso, but he was recalled to Florence due to the entry of the Republic of Siena into the war. He was assigned to Gian Giacomo Medici's army and participated in the Battle of Marciano, when the French-Sienese force led by Piero Strozzi was defeated. Vitelli spent the next months taking enemy cities from San Quirico d'Orcia to Scarlino, and helped Gabro Serbelloni defending Piombino from an Ottoman attack. Siena would be assimilated by Florence to become the Duchy of Florence.

After Charles V's death, Cosimo sent him as the Tuscan ambassador to the Spanish court, where King Philip II recruited him to expel the French garrison of Montalcino. Vitelli accomplished this through a mix of bribes and threats, impressing the monarch. In 1556 he was made marquis of Cetona, a title which he acquired from Cosimo I de' Medici. In Italy, he restored the fortress and built the Piazza Vitelli town square (1559), today the Piazza Garibaldi, as well as the Palazzo Vitelli which can be seen today, holding a significant art collection. He used acquisitions from other places, such as a belltower from Montepescali, a town he had surrounded near Grosseto (1555).

=== Mediterranean theater and Eighty Years' War ===
When Cosimo retired from governing duties in 1564, his succession by his son Francesco I made Vitelli an uncomfortable member of the old guard in Tuscany, leading him to join Philip II's armies full time. He would first serve under García Álvarez de Toledo y Osorio against the Muslims, participating in the 1564 Spanish conquest of Peñón de Vélez de la Gomera and helping redesign the local fortifications originally erected by Pedro Navarro, and being also part of the relief forces of the Great Siege of Malta.

Eventually he became part of the Tercio de Lombardía under Fernando Álvarez de Toledo, Duke of Alba, in route to repress the Dutch Revolt. He was also a general in the Spanish Army of Flanders, as well as Spanish ambassador to the England of Elizabeth I. His disappointment with not being granted the command of a mission, which went to the Duke's son Fadrique de Toledo, drove him to quit and return to Florence, but he would join Alba again two years later, personally defeating an army led by Jean de Hangest in 1572. His military inventions include a siege technique, first tried at the Siege of Mons the same year. He had a personal role in the subsequent battle, where he directed the defense against Hangest's forces from a litter after being wounded in a leg by an arquebus shot.

By this point of his life, Vitelli had lost his athletic build and became famously obese, so much that he needed a special belt to be able to move around. He attempted to lose all the weight by drinking large quantities of vinegar, succeeding at the cost of his health going down and his body becoming flaccid. He died shortly after in the Netherlands in 1575.
