= Bonfigli =

Bonfigli is an Italian surname. Notable people with the surname include:

- Antonio Bonfigli (1806–1865), Italian painter, architect, and miniaturist
- Benedetto Bonfigli (c. 1420–1496), Italian painter
- Emiliano Bonfigli (born 1989), Argentine footballer
- Emilio Bonfigli (1902–1987), Italian boxer

== See also ==
- Bonfiglio
