= Angela de' Rossi =

Italian noblewoman

Angela Paola de' Rossi (1506 - 11 November 1573) was an Italian noblewoman. She was born to Troilo I de' Rossi and Bianca Riario in San Secondo Parmense. Her first husband was Vitello Vitelli; they married in 1522. After Vitello's death in 1528, she married Alessandro Vitelli. Both husbands were from the Vitelli family. She died in Città di Castello.
