= Bergzabern Palace =

Coordinates: 49°06′12″N 7°59′56″E

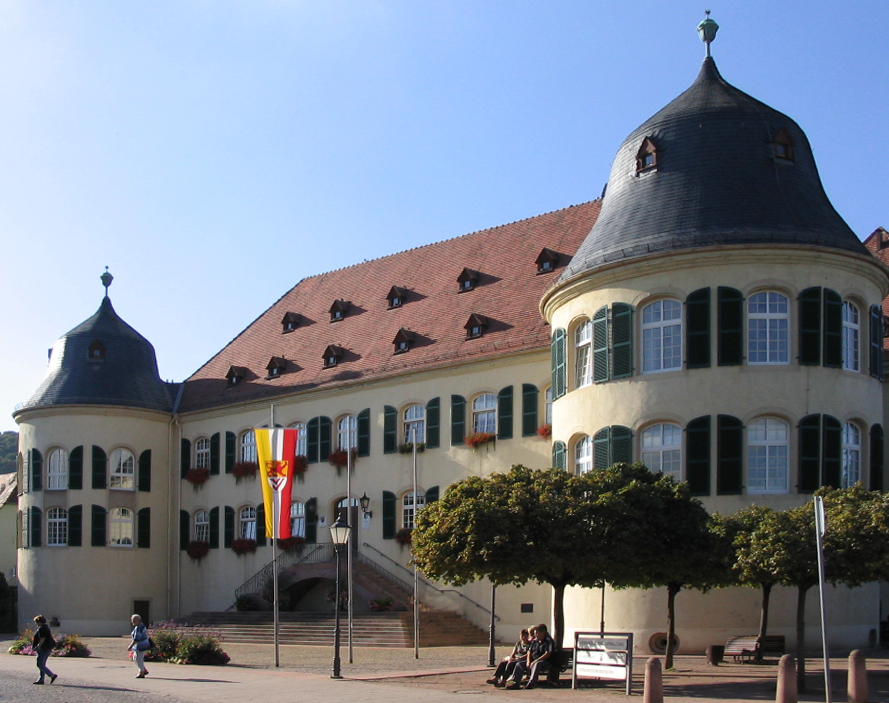
Bad Bergzabern Schloss

Bergzabern Palace (German: Bergzabern Schloss) is a landmark in the town of Bad Bergzabern, located in the old town centre. Formerly the residence of the Dukes of Pfalz-Zweibrücken, it now houses the administrative functions of the local government of Bad Bergzabern.

== History ==
The Counts of Saarbrücken probably built a water castle in the 12th and 13th centuries on the site of the present palace. It was first mentioned in 1333 as "Feste Zabern by Lantecken". In 1385, it fell to the Electorate of the Palatinate and then, via succession in 1410, into the possession of Palatinate-Zweibrücken.

In 1525, the castle complex was destroyed by insurgent Lorraine peasants who had taken the town. Louis II of Zweibrücken rebuilt the complex, this time in the form of a "Burgschloss" i.e. a mixture of a fortified castle and an unfortified palace. In 1532, the south wing was completed, still in evidence today in the two round towers which served at the time as turrets. The castle was also protected at this time by a moat.

In 1676, it was destroyed, largely by fire, after an attack by French troops but subsequently rebuilt (1720–25) by the Swedish-Zweibrücken minister of buildings. In 1794, the French conquered the palace, which was then auctioned off in 1803 as a so-called national property. Also around this time, the surrounding moat was filled. The palace became the property of the town of Bergzabern, but once again suffered significant damage in a fire in 1909 and was thereafter used as a school until it was established, after major renovation, as the seat of the Bad Bergzabern local government in 1984.

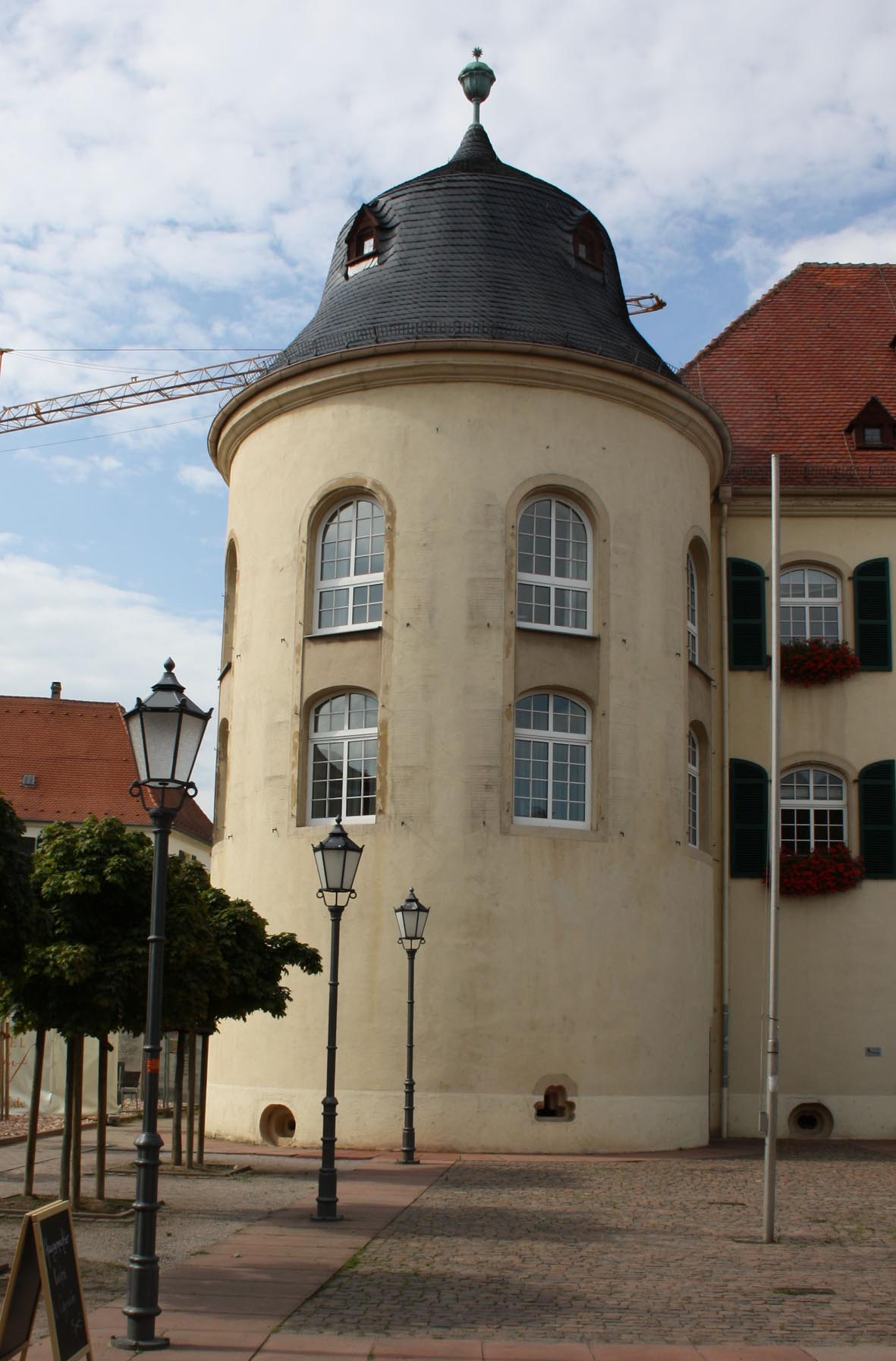
Southwest Tower

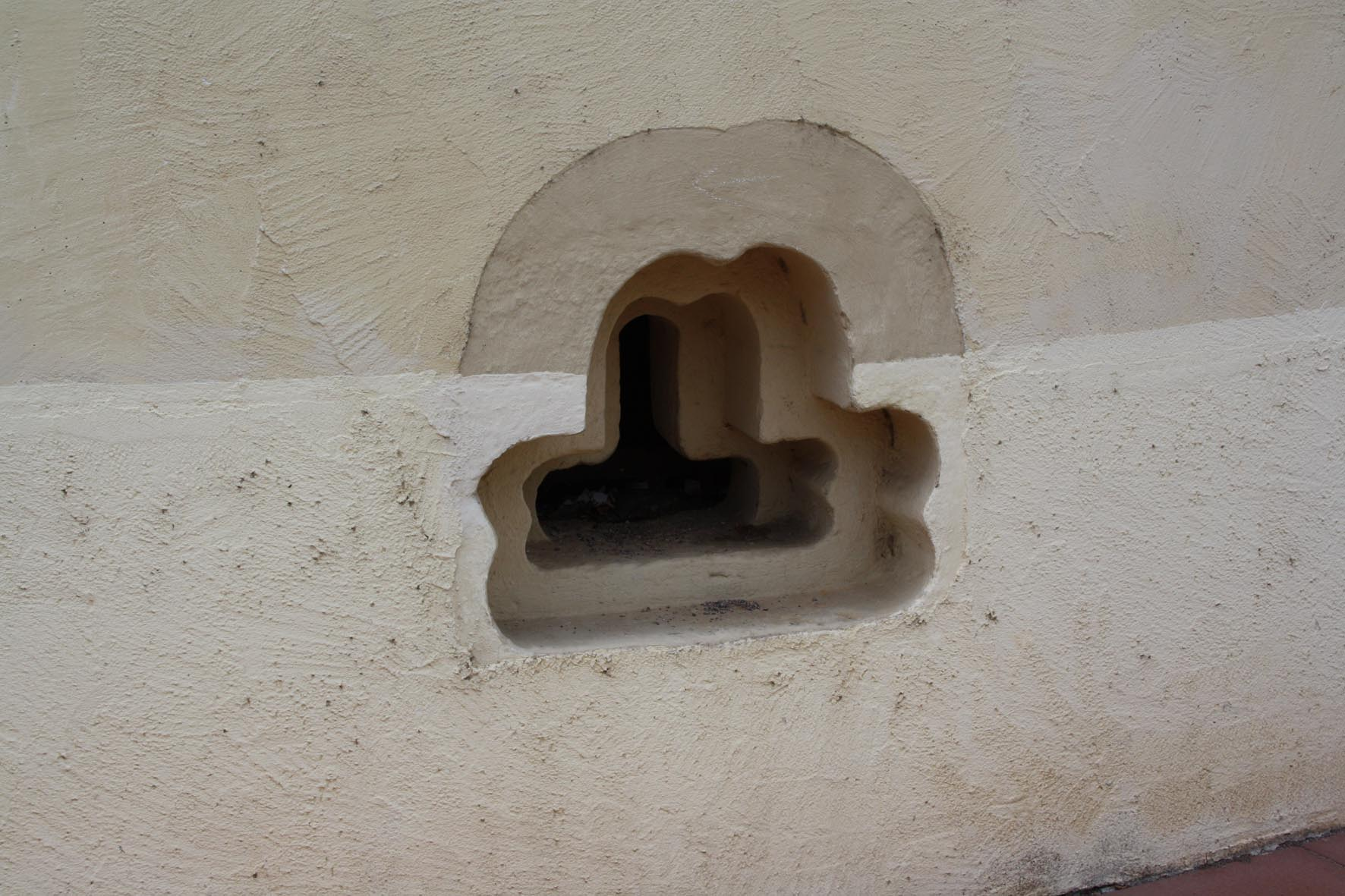
Spectacles-shaped Embrasure

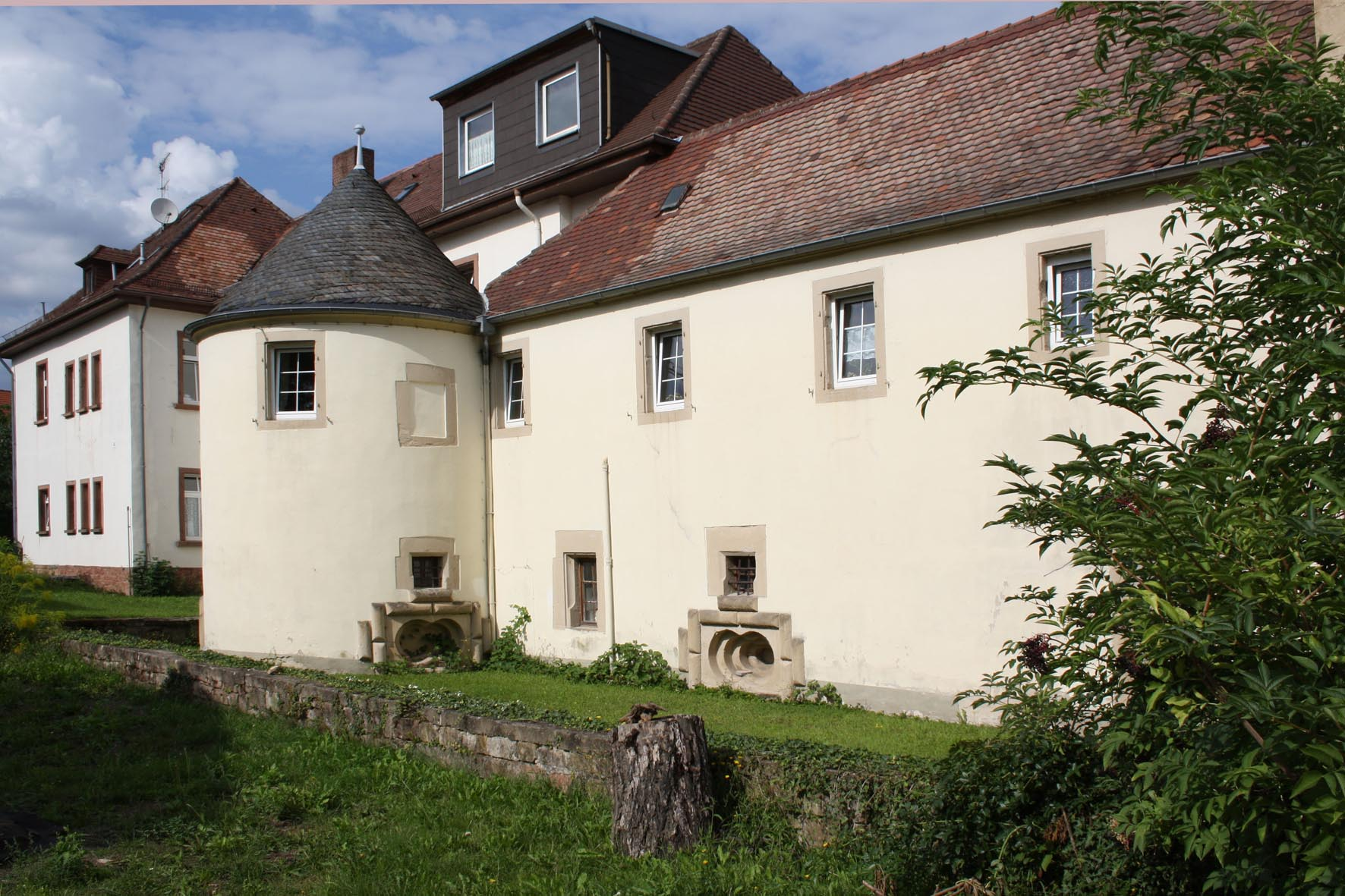
Northwest Tower
