= Vitello Vitelli =

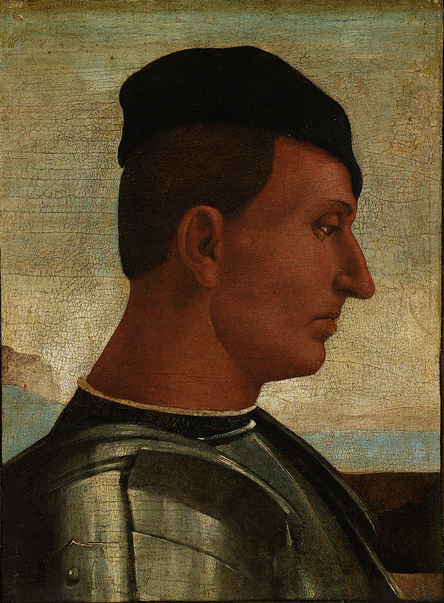
Portrait of Vitello's father Camillo by Luca Signorelli (c. 1493-1496)

Vitello Vitelli (1480 - May 1528) was an Italian knight and condottiero. Born in Città di Castello and belonging to the Vitelli family, he was the son of Camillo. He became count of Montone and is notable as the first husband of Angela de' Rossi, member of the Rossi di Parma family. He had excellent military abilities and was one of the favourites of Pope Leo X and Pope Clement VII. He died in Naples in 1528.
