= Alessandro Vitelli =

Italian condottiero

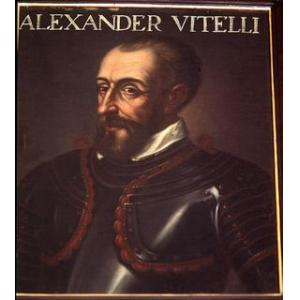
Vitelli

Alessandro Vitelli (1500 – 1554) was an Italian condottiero in the service of the Holy Roman Empire, the Papal States and the Grand Duchy of Tuscany. He was an illegitimate son of Paolo Vitelli and the second husband of Angela de' Rossi. He also became count of Montone, count of Citerna and lord of Amatrice. He was born in Città di Castello and died in Citerna.
