= Pier Maria III de' Rossi =

Italian general and nobleman

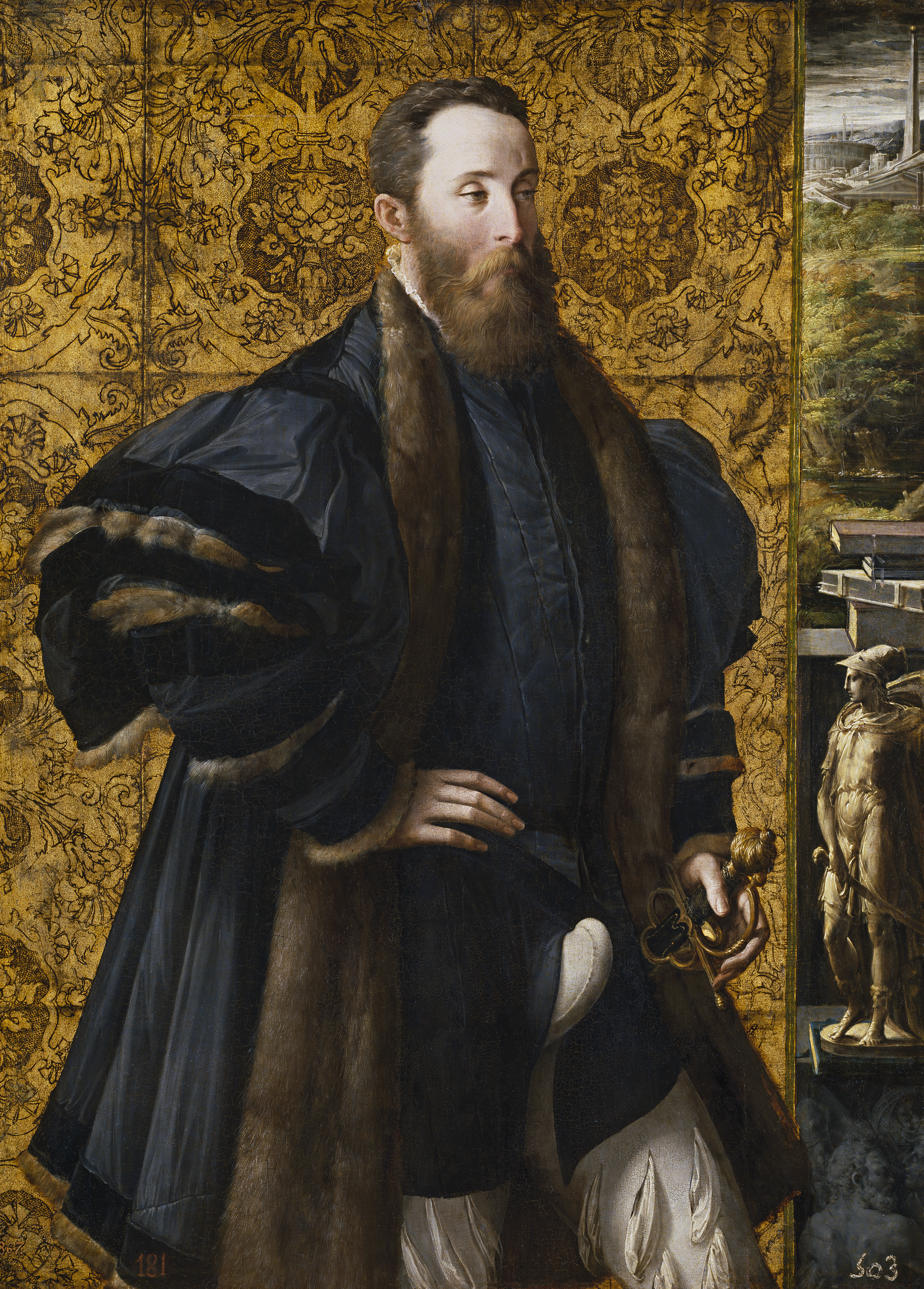
Portrait of Pier Maria Rossi di San Secondo by Parmigianino (1535–1539), Museo del Prado.

Pier Maria III de' Rossi (1504 – 15 August 1547) was an Italian general and nobleman, the second marquess and seventh count of San Secondo.

== Biography ==
Born in San Secondo Parmense, he was a member of the local Rossi noble family, the son of Troilo I de' Rossi and Bianca Riario, the first daughter of Caterina Sforza and the half-sister of Giovanni delle Bande Nere. He was also the brother of bishop Giovangirolamo de' Rossi.

He was educated at the Medici court together with his uncle Giovanni, who was nearly the same age. At his father's death (1521), he inherited the family lands as count of San Secondo. In 1523 he married Camilla Gonzaga, who brought a dowry of 6,000 ducati, jewels, furniture and other assets.

After a first sojourn in France, Pier Maria returned to Italy, and here he defended the family fiefs alongside his uncle. During the siege of Florence (1529–1530), he commanded a corps of the imperial troops. Under the service of emperor Charles V, he was at Tunis in 1535, in Provence in 1536 and in Albania in 1537; in reward, he obtained an imperial privilege which granted his lands independence from the nearby Parma. In those years he was portrayed by the local painter Parmigianino, who perhaps also depicted his wife. Both paintings are now at the Museo del Prado in Madrid.

In 1542, he entered the service of king Francis I of France, who named him general and knight of the Order of St. Michael. He also held a correspondence with humanist Pietro Aretino.

He died in France in 1547.

== Sources ==
- Ettore Camesasca, ed. (2007). Vita di Benvenuto Cellini. Milan: Rizzoli. ISBN 978-88-17-16532-7.
