= Paolo Vitelli (condottiero) =

Italian knight and condottiero

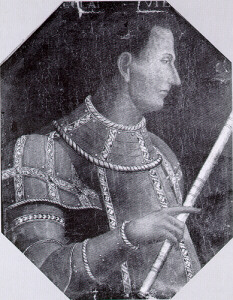
Portrait of Vitelli

Paolo Vitelli (1461 – 1 October 1499) was an Italian knight and condottiero as well as lord of Montone. He was born in Città di Castello, which had been captured by his father, Niccolò Vitelli. He was the brother of Vitellozo and Chiappino, both condottieri. He worked as a mercenary for the republic of Florence, where he was later suspected of treachery and executed. This led his brother Vitellozzo to repeatedly assail Tuscan properties.
