= Niccolò Vitelli =

Italian condottiero

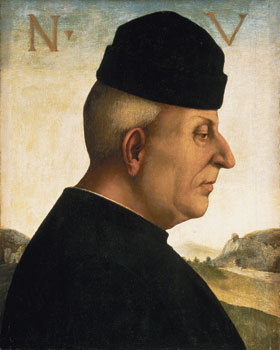
Portrait by Luca Signorelli

Niccolò Vitelli (1414–1486) was an Italian condottiero of the Vitelli family from Città di Castello.

The son of Giovanni Vitelli and Maddalena dei Marchesi di Petriolo, he was orphaned and grew up under the tutelage of his uncle Vitellozzo who introduced him into the political life of the area. He was podestà in some of the major Italian cities, such as Florence, Siena, Genoa and Perugia.

He frequently clashed with the Popes Paul II and Sixtus IV for the rule of Città di Castello. In 1474 he was besieged in the city by Giuliano della Rovere (future Pope Julius II) and Federico III da Montefeltro. He had to leave the city, to which he however returned in 1482. The following year he was excommunicated and, in 1484, left Città di Castello again, only to return shortly after Sixtus IV's death.

Following his death in 1486, the city's people had the inscription Pater Patriae ("Father of the Nation") written on his tomb. Three of his sons, Chiappino, Vitellozzo and Paolo were mercenary captains. The former was also a military leader for Tuscany and Spain. The latter two fought for various Italian forces, but ended up executed by their former employers: the Medici of Florence for Paolo, and Cesare Borgia in the case of Vitellozzo. He was also an ancestor of Cardinal Mazarin
