= Jean de Hangest, seigneur d'Yvoy =

Past French military commander

Jean de Hangest, seigneur d'Yvoy, was a Protestant Huguenot military commander during the French Wars of Religion.

For the period between the death of his elder brother, Francois de Hangest Sieur de Genlis & d'Abbecourt, in 1569 and his own death in 1572, texts often refer to Jean as simply Genlis, as he assumed his brother’s title. Confusingly, many texts use the name Genlis for the actions of first François and then Jean, without distinction. A member of the Protestant Huguenot party, he became a principal lieutenant of Admiral de Coligny. In 1562 defended town of Bourges for 20 days. However, the town was lost, causing the Prince Conde to lack confidence in both Jean and his brother François. In 1570, Jean took Valenciennes for the Huguenots.

Encouraged by the King of France, Charles IX, to take the Protestant fight to the Netherlands, in 1572, Jean took 7,000 men to relieve the Spanish Siege of Mons, where he was taken captive, moved to Antwerp, and there he was strangled in his bed (11 July 1572).

As the family was heavily in debt, and they had to sell the lands and title Genlis to Pierre Brûlart.
