= Vitelli =

Vitelli is an Italian surname.

The Vitelli family were a prominent noble family of Umbria.

== Other people named Vitelli ==
Other people with the surname Vitelli:

- Joe Vitelli (1908 - 1967), American Major League Baseball pitcher
- Paolo Vitelli (businessman), yacht manufacturer (Azimut-Benetti)

== In fiction ==
- Apollonia Vitelli-Corleone is a fictional character in Mario Puzo's novel The Godfather
- Andrea Vitelli is the protagonist of Paul Féval, père's novel Bel Demonio
