= Riario =

Italian noble family

House of Riario Italian: Casa Riario
- Noble family
- Motto: "The upright like the palm will bloom" (Latin: Iustus ut palma florebit)
- Country: Italy
- Founded: c. 1100
- Founder: Degenardo Riario
- Final ruler: Girolamo Riario
- Titles: Lord of Forlì and Imola
- Style: "His/Her Excellency"
- Dissolution: 1877; 149 years ago
- Deposition: 1488

The House of Riario, sometimes referred to as Riario-Sforza, is an Italian noble family from Savona, near Genoa. Closely associated with the Papal States, the family gained control over several lordships such as Bologna and Forlì.

== History ==
The ascent of the Riario family resulted from the marriage of Paolo Riario to Bianca della Rovere, sister of Francesco della Rovere, the future Pope Sixtus IV. Through their allegiance to the House of Della Rovere, the Riarios produced two prominent cardinals, Pietro Riario (1445–1474) and Raffaele Riario (1461–1521).

In 1477 Paolo's son Girolamo (1443–1488) married Caterina Sforza (1463–1509), illegitimate daughter of Galeazzo Maria Sforza, the Duke of Milan. Girolamo was the Lord of Imola, and after his marriage with Caterina, also Lord of Forlì, replacing Pino III Ordelaffi, member of the powerful House of Ordelaffi.

In 1478, Girolamo supported the Pazzi conspiracy against the Medici family. When this failed, he attempted a territorial expansion against the Duchy of Ferrara which in 1482 became known as the "Salt War". The war caused the cession of Rovigo from Ferrara to Venice, but the Papal States did not obtain any territory. The war resulted in an economic crisis, and Forlì was heavily taxed, whereby Girolamo became unpopular. Eventually he was murdered by the rival House of Orsi in 1488, and his wife Caterina became regent for his son Ottaviano Riario (1479–1523).

However, the death of Pope Sixtus IV in 1484 weakened the House of Riario. In 1499 Pope Alexander VI, member of the House of Borgia, created the title of "Duke of Romagna" (uniting the lordships of Forlì, Imola, Faenza, Cesena, Ravenna and Rimini) for his illegitimate son Cesare Borgia, and the Riario family removed first to Bologna, then also to Rome and Naples.

Currently the head of the Riario family holds the title of Prince of Ardore, a cadet branch inherited the title of Prince of Carbognano from the Barberini family.

Other notable members of the house include:

- Bianca Riario (1478–1522); daughter of Girolamo
- Archbishop Cesare Riario (1480–1540); son of Girolamo
- Galeazzo Maria Riario (1485–15??); son of Girolamo
- Bishop Francesco Riario (1487–15??); son of Girolamo
- Cardinal Alessandro Riario (1543–1585)
- Duke Ferdinando Riario (17th century), officer of the Holy Roman Empire
- Giovanni Riario (1769–1836), soldier
- Cardinal Tommaso Riario Sforza (1782–1857)
- Cardinal Sisto Riario Sforza (1810–1877)
- Urbano Riario Barberini Colonna (b. 1961), Prince and actor
