= Giacomo Feo =

2nd husband of Caterina Sforza

Giacomo Feo (c. 1471 – 27 August 1495), was the second husband of Caterina Sforza, Countess of Forlì. He was born and died in Forlì.

== Biography ==
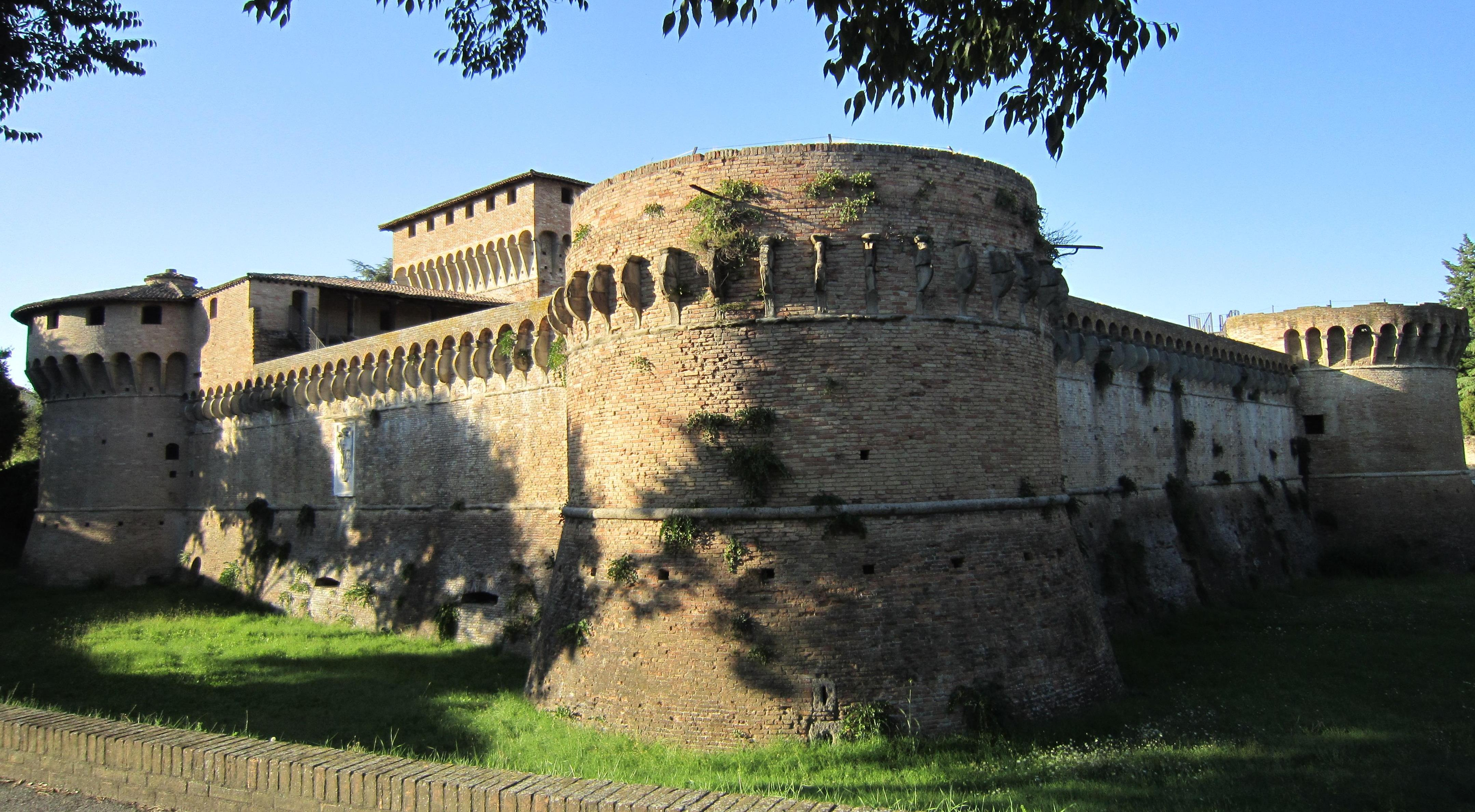
Ravaldino

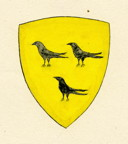
Coat of Arms of Giacomo Feo Baron of France

Giacomo Feo was the brother of Tommaso Feo, the castellan who had remained faithful to Caterina Sforza after the assassination of her husband.

Following the assassination in 1488 of Caterina Sforza's first husband, Count Girolamo Riario, lord of Imola and Forlì, she appointed Giacomo Feo, a handsome stable groom in her household, to be the castellan of the fortress Ravaldino in Forlì. Feo and Sforza became lovers and they married in secret so she could avoid the possibility of losing custody of her children and the regency.

The chronicles and diplomatic dispatches of the period reported that Sforza was very enamoured with Feo, and it was feared that she would give political precedence and power to him, passing over her eldest son and Riario's heir, Ottaviano. These fears led to two failed conspiracies to assassinate Feo and Sforza.

The third conspiracy, organized by Giovanni Antonio Ghetti, finally succeeded in killing Feo on 27 August 1495 when he and Sforza and their entourage were returning to Forlì from a hunting trip. Sforza and her daughter, Bianca, led the group in a carriage, while Feo, along with Sforza's sons, Ottaviano and Cesare, followed on horseback. As they approached the Schiavonia gate into Forlì, Feo was cut off from the others by the conspirators, stabbed and beaten to death. Sforza escaped to the safety of Ravaldino.

Giovanni Antonio Ghetti thought he would be regarded as a liberator of the city, but Caterina Sforza responded swiftly to avenge Feo's murder. Thirty-eight people were executed for the crime - including Ghetti and his wife and children - and many others were imprisoned or exiled.

Giacomo Feo was laid to rest in the Church of San Girolamo in Forlì.

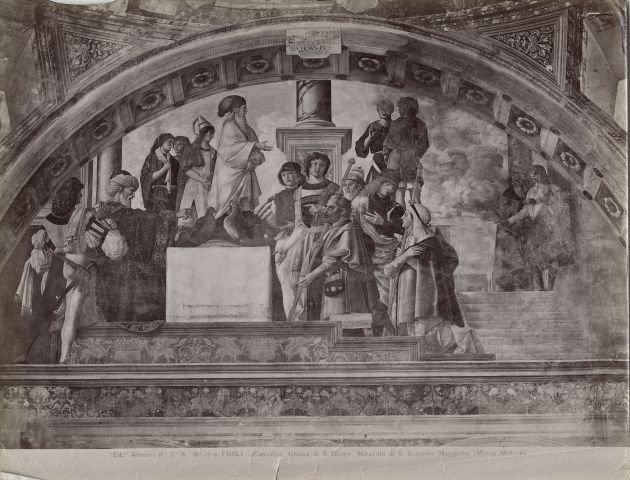
Portrait of Giacomo Feo (the tallest man standing on the right), Melozzo da Forlì

His portrait was prominently featured in a fresco painted by Marco Palmezzano, The Miracle of Saint James the Elder, in the Feo Chapel, the Church of San Biagio, Forlì. The fresco was destroyed during the Second World War.

== Children ==
Giacomo Feo and Caterina Sforza had one child, Bernardino (April 1489 – 1509), later called Carlo, in honour of Charles VIII.
