= Gli Experimenti =

Alchemy manuscript by Caterina Sforza

Gli Experimenti de la Ex.ma S.r Caterina da Furlj Matre de lo inllux.mo S.r Giouanni de Medici (English: The Experiments of the Most Excellent Lady Caterina of Forlì, mother of the Most Illustrious Lord Giovanni de’ Medici), or simply Gli Experimenti, is a manuscript where Italian noblewoman Caterina Sforza recorded the results of a series of alchemy experiments that she conducted in the last years of her life. The book dates back to 1500 and contains a total of 454 recipes, roughly 66 of which are cosmetic related, 358 medicinal, and 38 alchemical. Her experimental activities situate her at the origins of a Medici interest that stretched well into the seventeenth century.

== Manuscript ==
When Sforza relocated to Forlì in 1484, she continued her experiments. She had medicinal gardens constructed where she was able to develop the ingredients she needed for her recipes. Along the exterior border of the fortress, an extensive garden was developed where she could grow various fruit trees.

In her Experimenti, she had procedures and recipes for many cosmetics ranging from lotions and lip colors to hair dyes. Additionally, she listed several medicinal recipes such as cures for sciatica, cancer, fevers, and coughs. While she focused on alchemy, her recipes became a foundation for historical pharmacology. According to Meredith Ray, the foremost historian on Caterina Sforza, "Caterina’s manuscript collapses boundaries between alchemy and medicine, practical and arcane, home and court." Furthermore, her letters provided evidence that there was a large network of shared information and practices between male and female alchemists.

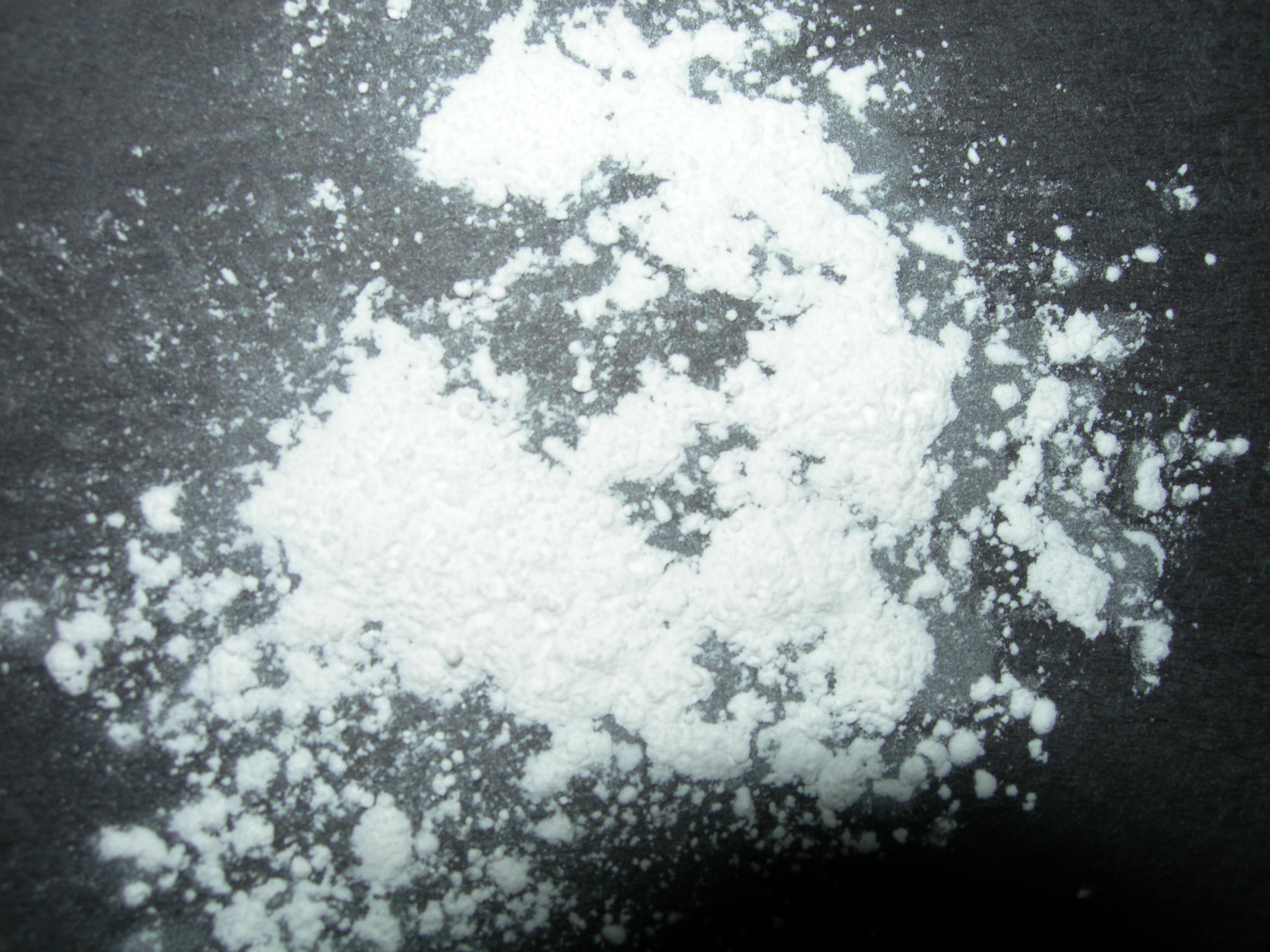
Talcum Powder

One thing she focused on across all categories of her Experimenti, was talc. Talc, or talcum, is a clay mineral that occurs naturally. She used talc in everything from cosmetics and medicine to alchemy. Her experiments show that talc could be used for making women more beautiful, a cure for poison, and turning gold to silver. While she focused a considerable amount of her work on talc, that is not all she did.

As an alchemist Caterina's manuscript has many overlaps between what is strictly medicinal and cosmetic and what is alchemy, as she incorporated it into many of the over 400 recipes wrote about. For instance she had made cosmetics such as hair dyes and lotions, and these cosmetic recipes used alchemical principles and methods for production. For example these cosmetic recipes would, "use of herbs and plants distilled in alchemical vessels", the distillation process mentioned was a foundational part of alchemy at the time, and used throughout her manuscript across all disciplines. In many places her work with medicine, becomes alchemical due to the spiritual and philosophical nature of what she was producing. For example in Experimenti Caterina wrote about was "elisir vitae, an elixir capable of conferring perpetual health and youth" which is described "principal goal of therapeutic alchemy." She claims this elixir has the ability "to raise the dead", cure the incurable, and achieve many other feats that were thought to be impossible. The instructions for this elixir written in her manuscript, "recall the principal stages of the alchemical process as described in many formal alchemical texts", and describe her using glass vessels that were used by most alchemist at the time. Using these same principles Caterina also produced a "marvelous and divine water" which would improve memory, treat Leprosy, and cure many other aches and illnesses. This water is a medicinal remedy, but is alchemical due to its extraordinary and 'divine' nature much like the "elisir vitae". Although there is overlap between all these disciplines in her writing she has other more apparent alchemy related endeavors that did not have any cosmetic or medicinal advantages. For instance Caterina was regent of Forlì and Imola, and needed to alleviate financial burden to further her political standing, so she utilized alchemy. She would make metal appear to be gold by changing its weight and color via principles of alchemy.

== Publication ==
After her death, her manuscript was passed down to her son, Giovanni dalle Bande Nere. It was then passed down from generation to generation and stayed within the Medici family. The manuscript eventually was lost. In the 19th century, Pier Desiderio Pasolini (1844–1920), a descendant of Caterina Sforza and a historian from Ravenna, spent approximately five years acquiring documents written by Sforza. He then went on to publish the majority of her manuscript titled "Experimenti".

== Bibliography ==
- Pasolini, Pier Desiderio (1913). Caterina Sforza (in Italian). Firenze: G. Barbèra. p. 415. OCLC 697609908 – via Internet Archive.
