= The Tigress of Forlì =

2011 biography by Elizabeth Lev

- Author: Elizabeth Lev
- Language: English
- Publisher: Houghton Mifflin Harcourt
- Publication date: October 20, 2011
- Publication place: United States
- Pages: 320
- ISBN: 978-0-15-101299-2

The Tigress of Forlì: Renaissance Italy's Most Courageous and Notorious Countess, Caterina Riario Sforza de' Medici is a biography of Caterina Sforza, a 15–16th century Italian noblewoman, written by Elizabeth Lev. It was published in October 2011 by Houghton Mifflin Harcourt, and received positive reviews.

== Background ==
The Tigress of Forlì was the first book written by Elizabeth Lev, an American-born scholar of the Renaissance and professor at the Duquesne University's campus in Rome at the time of publication. The title of the book came from the notoriety that Caterina Sforza earned for her actions in defending a besieged fortress in Forlì. An ambassador during the siege referred to her as a tigress due to her being "willing to eat her young to gain power".

== Contents ==
The Tigress of Forlì follows Caterina Sforza from her birth in 1463 as an illegitimate child of the Duke of Milan, her ascension to power and notoriety, and the end of her rule after she was captured by Cesare Borgia. She died shortly after her release from captivity, at the age of 46 in 1509.

Sforza was married and widowed three times, with her first marriage being at the age of 10. She was credited with being one of the most successful diplomats and rulers at the time, ruling as regent in place of her son. She once negotiated a favorable military alliance with Niccolò Machiavelli early in his career, which is credited with him later denouncing her in his political works.

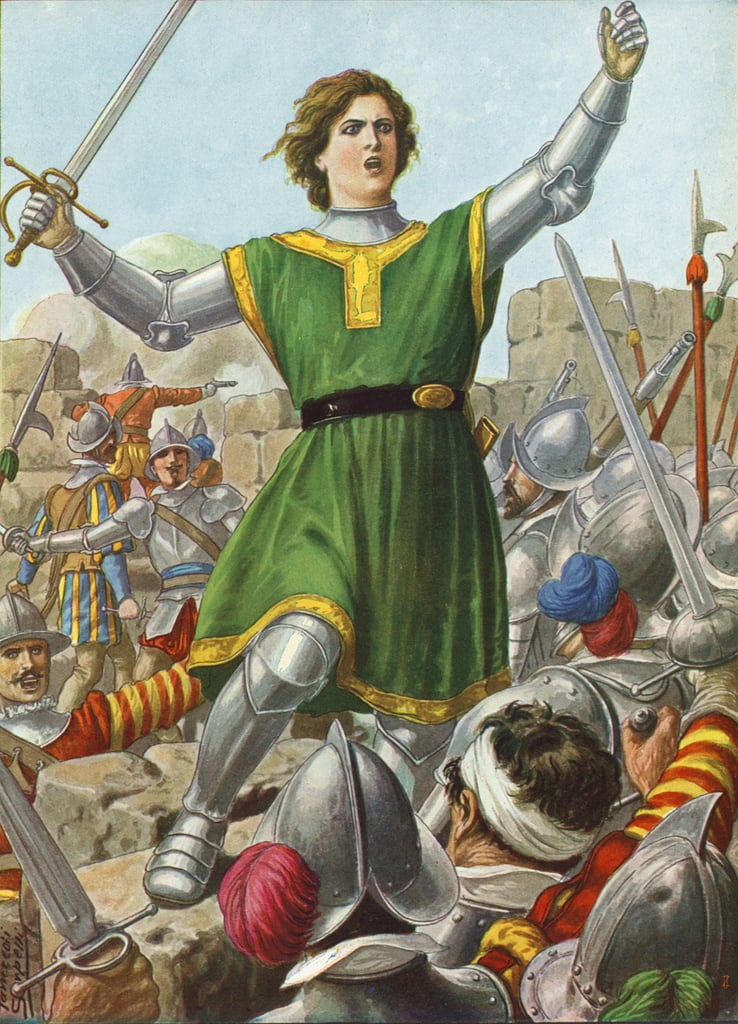
A c. 1929 painting of Caterina Sforza leading the resistance at Forlì in 1500

One disputed legend about Sforza claims that, when her children were taken hostage during a siege for a fortress in Forlì, she raised her skirts while proclaiming that it would be okay if they were hanged in front of her, because she had the ability to make more. Lev asserts that the threat was made, but the lifting of the skirts was an invention, although Lev does credit her with making a rude gesture (the fig) towards the besieging forces instead.

== Reception ==
Critics noted The Tigress of Forlì for its high quality depictions of actions, scenery, and political drama, with Kirkus Reviews describing it as "[a]n engrossing biography", and The Spectator "a triumph". In an article for The New York Times Book Review, Dominique Browning described it as "a tale of feminism gone wild". Booklist appreciated it for bringing attention to Sforza, who had been overlooked despite her notoriety in her time. Writing for First Things, Sebastian White appreciated that Lev portrayed the story without whitewashing Sforza's acts that could be seen as "shocking (and felonious)" to modern readers.
