= Ottaviano Riario =

Italian noble (1479–1523)

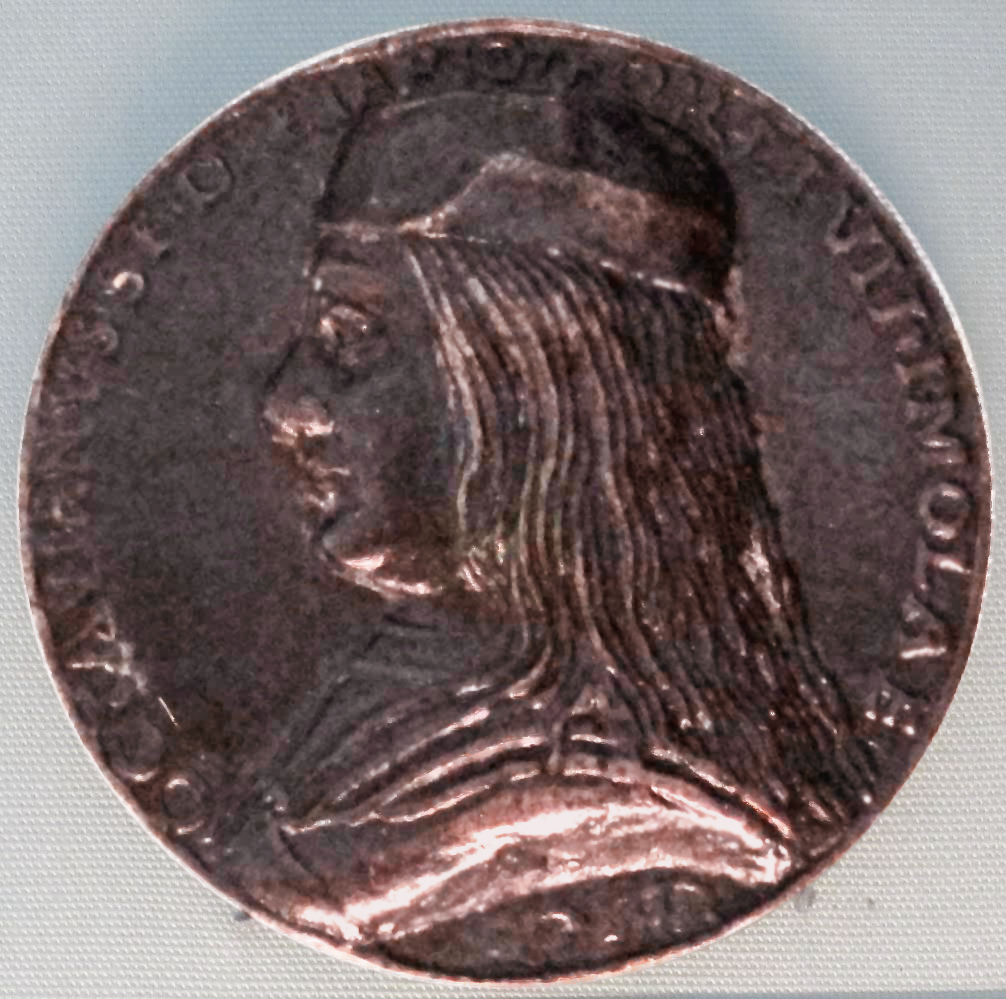
- Medal of Ottaviano Sforza-Riario (1490s)

Lord of Imola and Forlì
- In office July 1488 – January 1500

Personal details
- Born: September 1479 Forlì, Papal States (now in Italy)
- Died: 1523 Italy
- Parent(s): Girolamo Riario; Caterina Sforza
- Relatives: Bianca Riario (sister)

Military service
- Battles/wars: Siege of Pisa

Ottaviano Riario (born September 1479 – 1523) was an Italian condottiero and Lord of Imola and Forlì. Despite his nominal leadership, the real power lay with his mother Caterina Sforza.

== Early life ==
He was the oldest son of Girolamo Riario, a nephew of Pope Sixtus IV who had obtained possessions in Italy thanks to the pontiff's patronage, and Caterina Sforza. After his father's murder, he was created lord of Imola and Forlì in July 1488 by Pope Innocent VIII, under the regency of his mother.

Despite his official status, the nine-year-old Ottaviano was, in reality, controlled by his mother and her lover Giacomo Feo. When Feo humiliated Ottaviano in public by slapping him, his nominal courtiers did nothing to support him. After this episode, the situation in Forlì became very strained. Ottaviano's friends plotted to use the episode as motivation in ridding the city from the rule of Giacomo Feo by assassinating him. The first attempt in 1490 failed. Five years later, on 27 August 1495, Feo was ambushed and killed. The fifteen-year-old Ottaviano was not involved.

== Later lordship ==
Feo's death did not diminish the power of Ottaviano's mother, who continued to make decisions on his behalf. Ottaviano was employed twice by the Florentines as a condottiero to defend Florentine interests. He was offered 15,000 florins in 1497 and 10,000 in 1499. Niccolò Machiavelli undertook negotiations on the second occasion. Ottaviano was still only the nominal leader, as the actual negotiations were conducted with Caterina.

However, Ottaviano personally commanded small forces in these local wars. In 1498 he took part in the siege of Pisa with 100 men-at-arms and 100 light horse. In 1499 he aided Ludovico Sforza, who was at war with the French and Venetians. At this point the Borgias decided to intervene. Pope Alexander VI sent his son Cesare Borgia to capture Imola and Forlì, claiming that dues had not been paid. Caterina and Ottaviano were deposed in January 1500.

After Alexander's death Ottaviano made several attempts to recapture his territories, but was unable to muster sufficient forces to achieve his goal.

== Church career ==
Ottaviano later entered the church. On 16 September 1506 he was elected bishop of Viterbo and he remained in that position until his death in 1523.

== Ancestry ==
Ancestors of Ottaviano Riario

Bartolomeo Riario
Raffaele Riario
Paolo Riario
Girolamo Riario
Leonardo della Rovere
Bianca della Rovere
Luchina Monteleoni
Ottaviano Riario
Muzio Sforza
Francesco Sforza, Duke of Milan
Lucia da Torsano
Galeazzo Maria Sforza, Duke of Milan
Filippo Maria Visconti, Duke of Milan
Bianca Maria Visconti, Duchess of Milan
Agnese del Maino
Caterina Sforza
Landriani
Lucrezia Landriani

== Bibliography ==
- de Vries, Joyce (2016). Caterina Sforza and the Art of Appearances: Gender, Art and Culture in Early Modern Italy. Routledge. p. 322. ISBN 9781351953207.
