= Caterina Sforza =

Italian noblewoman (1463–1509)

- Lady of Imola; Countess of Forlì; Regent of Imola and Forlì
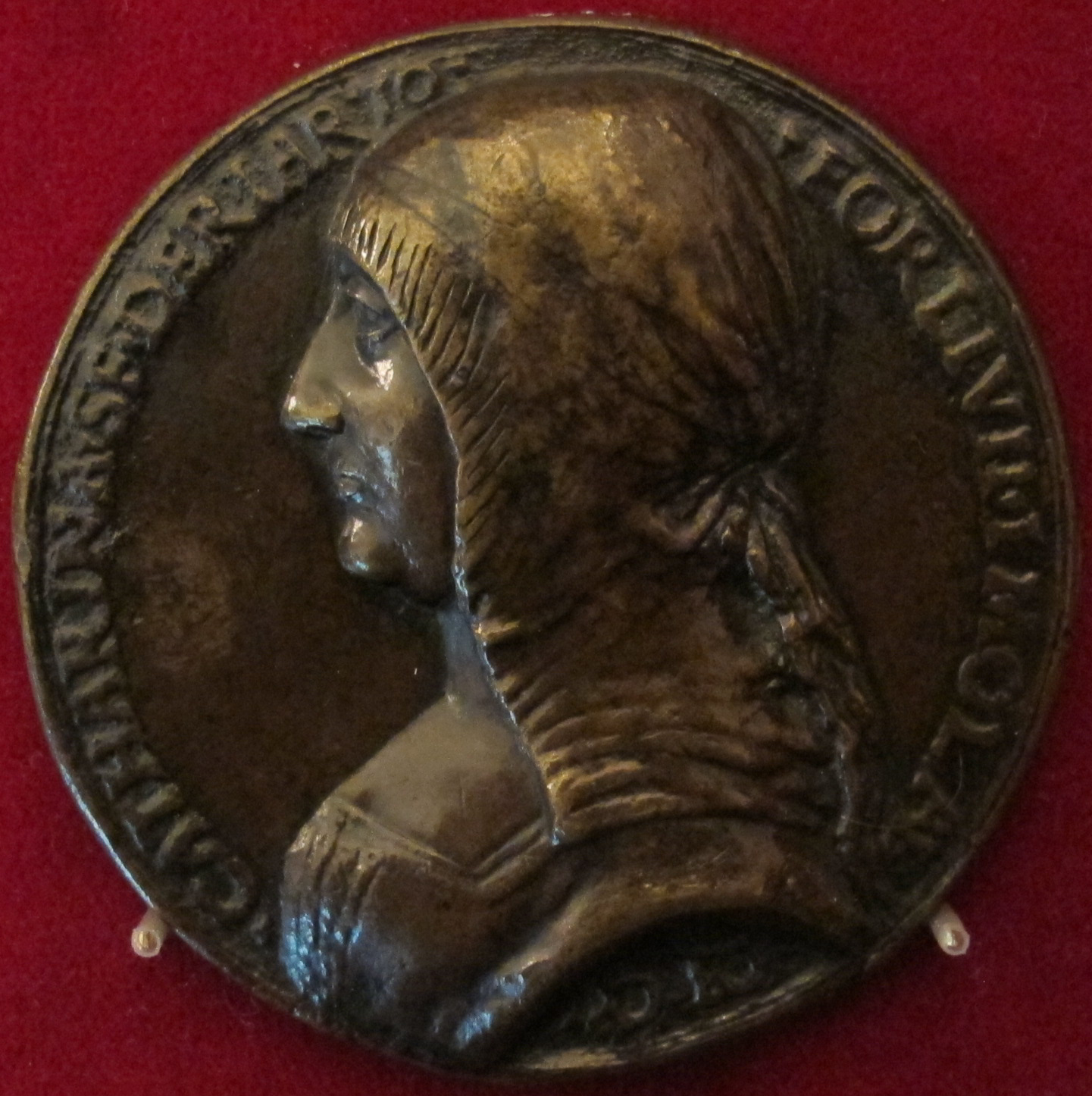
- Caterina Sforza, reproduction of a medal created c. 1488
- Born: 1463; Milan, Duchy of Milan
- Died: 28 May 1509 (aged 46); Florence, Republic of Florence
- Noble family: Sforza
- Spouses: Girolamo Riario; Giacomo Feo; Giovanni de' Medici il Popolano
- Issue: Bianca Riario, Lady of Faenza, Countess and Marchioness of San Secondo; Ottaviano Riario; Cesare Riario; Giovanni Livio Riario; Galeazzo Maria Riario; Francesco Sforzino Riario; Bernardino (later Carlo) Feo; Ludovico (later Giovanni) de' Medici
- Father: Galeazzo Maria Sforza, Duke of Milan
- Mother: Lucrezia Landriani

Caterina Sforza (1463 – 28 May 1509) was an Italian noblewoman who ruled as Countess of Forlì and Lady of Imola, initially alongside her husband Girolamo Riario, and later as regent for their son, Ottaviano Riario. She is mentioned in the Florentine Histories written by her contemporary Italian diplomat and political theorist Niccolo Machiavelli.

A descendant of a dynasty of prominent condottieri, Caterina Sforza distinguished herself from an early age through bold and impetuous actions aimed at safeguarding her possessions from usurpers and defending her dominions amid political intrigues. Her fearless and assertive character earned her the nickname La Tigre ("The Tiger"). In her private life, Caterina was devoted to various activities, including experiments in alchemy and a love of hunting, dancing, and horse riding. She was educated and engaged in religious rituals and matters, commissioned works of art, stood as a fashion icon, and was a collector of many jewels and clothing. In addition, she undertook urban, residential, and military architectural projects.

She had many children, but only the youngest, Giovanni delle Bande Nere, inherited his mother's forceful, militant personality. Caterina's resistance to Cesare Borgia meant she had to face his fury and imprisonment. After she gained her freedom in Rome, she then went on to lead a quiet life in Florence. In the final years of her life, she confided to a monk: "Se io potessi scrivere tutto, farei stupire il mondo" ("If I could write everything that happened, I would shock the world").

== Life ==
=== Childhood ===
Caterina Sforza was born in Milan in 1463. She was one of the four illegitimate children of Galeazzo Maria Sforza and his mistress Lucrezia Landriani (Note: Commonly known with her husband's surname, Lucrezia's parentage is unknown and her later life is obscure.) who was wife to Count Gian Piero Landriani. The Count was a courtier of the Milanese ducal court and a close friend to Galeazzo. In her early years, Caterina spent her time under the care of her mother's side of the family. The bond she had with her mother Lucrezia never faltered. She followed Caterina's growing years and stayed close during crucial moments of her life, even during her final years in Florence.

Following the death of Francesco, Caterina's paternal grandfather, and the succession of her father Galeazzo Maria Sforza as Duke of Milan in 1466, Caterina and her siblings were brought to court. All four of Lucrezia Landriani's children were entrusted to Bianca Maria Visconti, Caterina's paternal grandmother. After the death of his betrothed, Dorotea Gonzaga, in 1467, the Duke married on 9 May 1468 to Bona of Savoy who adopted all four children: Carlo, born in 1461 would later become Count of Magenta; Caterina; Alessandro, born in 1465 would later become Lord of Francavilla; and Chiara, born in 1467 would become Countess dal Verme di Sanguinetto through her first marriage, and Lady of Novi by her second.

Caterina and her siblings received a humanistic education while exposed to writers and artists at the Sforza court. Being part of an Italian noble family during this time meant she would receive the same education as her brothers. She benefited from learning Latin and reading classic works of the time. From her paternal grandmother, she learned to take pride in her warlike ancestors, to show boldness in the use of arms, and astuteness in the skill of government. From Bona, she received not only maternal warmth and affection, which the adoptive mother poured over all her husband's children, but also a potential first introduction to the world of botanical pharmaceuticals. Bona entered court with her personal apothecary, Cristoforo de Brugora, a line of work Caterina would explore later in life through her experiments. Her relationship with Bona would continue through correspondence after Caterina left the Milanese court.

Caterina's father, whose family resided in Milan and Pavia, was a devoted hunter and often stayed either at Galliate or Cusago. It is believed that between these two locations, her own passion for hunting was acquired.

=== First marriage ===
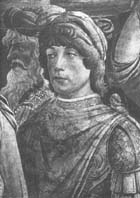
Count Girolamo Riario

Riario Coat of Arms

In 1473, Caterina became betrothed to Girolamo Riario, the son of Paolo Riario and Bianca della Rovere, sister of Pope Sixtus IV (in office: 1471–1484). Caterina replaced her cousin, the 11-year-old Costanza Fogliani, as Girolamo's bride because, according to some historians, Costanza's mother Gabriella Gonzaga (illegitimate daughter of Marquis Ludovico III of Mantua) refused to allow the consummation of the marriage until Costanza reached the legal age—then 14—while Caterina, although only ten years old at that time, agreed with the demands of the groom; other sources instead reported that the marriage of Caterina and Girolamo was celebrated on 17 January 1473, but consummated four years later (1477) when Caterina reached the age of fourteen, without giving further details about the broken betrothal with Costanza.

Pope Sixtus IV gave Girolamo the Lordship of Imola, already a Sforza city, but at the time a fief of the Riario family. Caterina was a part of the two richest courts in Italy after marrying Girolamo and being daughter to the Duke of Milan. After a triumphal entrance into Imola in 1477, Caterina went to Rome with her husband, where he lived for many years in the service of his uncle, the Pope. On 1 September 1479, Caterina gave birth to her first child, a son she named Ottaviano. More children with Girolamo would follow: Cesare on 25 August 1480, Bianca (her only daughter) at the end of October 1481, Giovanni Livio at the end of October 1484, Galeazzo on 18 December 1485, and Francesco (called Sforzino) on 17 August 1487.

=== In the Vatican court ===
At the end of the 15th century, Rome was no longer a medieval city, but not yet the important centre of artistic endeavors it would become a few decades later as one of the most important cities of the Renaissance. Upon her arrival in May 1477, Caterina found a city full of cultural fervour, with a desire for renovation.

The atmosphere was a mix of intrigue and power, which was pursued without scruples, with material interests far exceeding the spiritual. Caterina was banned by her husband from meddling in politics, but she quickly integrated—owing to her extroverted and sociable character—into aristocratic Roman society.

As evidenced by correspondence from that period, Caterina immediately became admired among noble Roman women. She was treated with great respect and praised by many, including the Pope, and she soon transformed from a simple adolescent into a powerful intermediary between the Roman court and other Italian courts, especially Milan.

Girolamo was given a leading position in the expansion policy of Pope Sixtus IV after the premature death of the Pope's favoured nephew, Cardinal Pietro Riario. His power grew daily, and he soon displayed increasing ruthlessness towards his enemies. In 1480, the Pope, with the objective of attaining a strong domain in the land of Romagna, assigned Girolamo the lordship of Forlì, which had remained vacant after it was sequestered from the Ordelaffi family. The new lord tried to earn the favour of the populace by erecting magnificent public buildings and churches, and by abolishing taxes.

The lives of Caterina and Girolamo changed abruptly with the death of Sixtus IV on 12 August 1484.

==== Occupation of Castel Sant'Angelo ====
When Pope Sixtus IV died, Girolamo made many enemies in Rome. Therefore, rebellions and disorder immediately spread through Rome, including looting of his supporters' residences. Girolamo's residence, the Orsini palace in Campo de' Fiori, was stripped of its contents and almost destroyed.

In this time of anarchy, Caterina, who was in her seventh month of pregnancy, crossed the Tiber on horseback to occupy the rocca (fortress) of Castel Sant'Angelo on behalf of her husband. From this position and with the obedience of the soldiers, Caterina could monitor the Vatican and dictate the conditions for the new conclave.

Meanwhile, the disorder in the city increased. A militia accompanied the arrival of the cardinals. The latter did not want to attend the funeral of Sixtus IV and refused to enter into conclave, for fear of coming under the fire of Caterina's artillery. The situation was difficult because only the election of a new Pope would put an end to the violence in Rome. Unsuccessful attempts to persuade her to leave the fortress failed, as she was determined to give it only to the new Pope, saying that Pope Sixtus had bestowed its control to her family.

Girolamo and his army occupied a strategic position at that point, yet could not implement an effective solution. The Sacred College asked Girolamo to leave Rome, offering in return the confirmation of his lordship over Imola and Forlì, the military post of captain-general of the Church, and 8,000 ducats in compensation for the damages to his property. Girolamo accepted. When Caterina was informed of the decisions taken by her husband, she increased the quota of her soldiers and made preparations for resistance in order to force the cardinals to parley with her. The cardinals again approached Girolamo, who took up a position against his wife. On 25 October 1484, Caterina surrendered the fortress to the Sacred College and left Rome with her family. The Sacred College were then able to meet in conclave to elect the new Pope.

=== Forlì ===
In Forlì, law and order had been maintained by Caterina's uncle Ludovico il Moro Sforza, Duke of Milan. On their arrival, the Riarios learned of the election of Giovanni Battista Cybo, an old opponent, as Pope Innocent VIII. He confirmed Girolamo in his lordships of Imola and Forlì and his appointment as captain-general. That appointment, however, was only nominal; Girolamo had no real control over the papal army and Innocent VIII refused to pay Girolamo for leaving Rome.

Despite the loss of income, Girolamo did not reinstate taxes on the people of Forlì.

This situation lasted until the end of 1485, when the city government completely ran out of money. Girolamo, pressed by a member of the Council of Elders, Nicolò Pansecco, was forced to levy taxes. The taxes were deemed excessive by the population and led to Girolamo's increased unpopularity among all citizens of Forlì.

The tax increase, which affected mainly craftsmen and landowners, added to the discontent that had previously been limited to the families who had suffered under Girolamo's persecution of those whom he suspected of treachery. His enemies began to conspire against him with a view to making Franceschetto Cybo, the illegitimate son of Pope Innocent, lord of Imola and Forlì in his stead.

==== Girolamo's death ====
After more than a half dozen failed attempts, Girolamo was killed on 14 April 1488 by a conspiracy led by the Orsis, a noble family of Forlì. The lord's palace was sacked, while Caterina and her six children were made prisoners.

The fortress of Ravaldino, a central part of the defensive system of the city, refused to surrender to the Orsis. Caterina offered to persuade the castellan, Tommaso Feo, to submit. The Orsis believed Caterina because she left her children as hostages, but once inside she let loose a barrage of vulgar threats and promises of vengeance against her former captors. According to one rumour, when they threatened to kill her children, Caterina, standing on the walls of the fortress, exposed her genitals and said: "Fatelo, se volete: impiccateli pure davanti a me ... qui ho quanto basta per farne altri!" ('Do it, if you want to: hang them even in front of me ... here I have what's needed to make others!'). This story, however, is most likely an embellishment. The historical record tells that Caterina, in fact, said she was pregnant. Although most historians consider this to have been a ruse, it removed any power the conspirators had in holding her children, Girolamo's legitimate heirs, hostage.

Shocked by this response, the Orsis did not dare touch the Riario children. With the assistance of her uncle Ludovico il Moro (very interested in securing some influence in the Romagna, to counter the influence of Venice), Caterina defeated her enemies and regained possession of her dominions.

==== Lady of Imola and Forlì ====
On 30 April 1488, Caterina became regent of Forlì for her eldest son Ottaviano, formally recognized by all the members of the Comune and the head of the magistrates as the new Lord of Forlì that day, but too young to exercise power directly. In a patriarchal society, women were considered irrational and vulnerable. Thus, regency was considered problematic because of the masculine role that the widow had to take on as a ruler. Nonetheless, Caterina defied the social and cultural barriers that society put on female regents and became known for her successful role as a regent for twelve years.

Caterina's first act as Regent of Forlì was to avenge the death of her husband, according to the custom of the time. She ordered that all those involved in the Orsi conspiracy were to be imprisoned, along with the Pope's governor, Monsignor Savelli, all the pontifical generals, and the castellan of the fortress of Forlimpopoli, and also all women of the Orsis and other families who had assisted in the conspiracy. Soldiers sought out all who had taken part in the conspiracy. Houses owned by those imprisoned were razed while their valuables were distributed to the poor.

On 30 July news came that Pope Innocent VIII had given Ottaviano Riario the official investiture of his state "until his line ended". In the meantime, Forlì was visited by Cardinal Raffaele Riario, officially to protect the orphan children of his late cousin Girolamo but actually, to oversee the government of Caterina.

The young Countess personally dealt with all issues concerning the government of her city-state, both public and private. To consolidate her power, she exchanged gifts with the lords of neighbouring states and involved herself in marriage negotiations for her children. She decreased taxes by reducing some and eliminating others, and sharply controlled her realm's spending. Caterina dealt directly with the training of her militia in the use of weapons and horses. It was her intention that her cities and towns be orderly and peaceful, and she expected her subjects to appreciate these efforts.

The states of Forlì and Imola were smaller than the great Italian states but, due to their geographical position, had a considerable strategic importance on the political affairs. In those years there were significant events that changed the geopolitical situation of Italy. Lorenzo il Magnifico, whose shrewd policy had curbed claims and rivalries of the various Italian states, died on 8 April 1492. Pope Innocent VIII also died on 25 July of that year, and was replaced by Cardinal Rodrigo Borgia, who took the name of Pope Alexander VI. His election seemed to strengthen Caterina's rule. While she and her husband had lived in Rome, the Cardinal had often been a guest at their home, and he was godfather to Ottaviano.

These events directly threatened the stability and peace in Italy. With the death of Lorenzo there came about friction between the Duchy of Milan and the Kingdom of Naples, leading up to the crisis of September 1494, when, incited by Ludovico il Moro, King Charles VIII of France entered into Italy to claim the Kingdom of Naples as the Anjou heir. At first Pope Alexander VI also gave his support to Charles's claim, leading to four years of war.

During the conflict between Naples and Milan, Caterina, who knew that she was placed in a strategic position of passage for anyone who wanted to go to the south, tried to remain neutral. She knew Forlì was exposed to invasion, located in a strategic position on the way to Rome. On one side, her uncle Ludovico had allied with Charles VIII; on the other side, Pope Alexander VI now opposed France's ambitions in Italy, and her brother-in-law, Cardinal Raffaele Riario, argued in favour of the incumbent King of Naples.

After a meeting on 23 September 1494, Caterina was persuaded by the Duke of Calabria Ferrandino d'Aragona to support King Alfonso II of Naples and prepared to defend Imola and Forlì.

To cause the break between the two was then the so-called sack of Mordano, which took place between 20 and 21 October: around the city of Mordano they had gathered between fourteen thousand to sixteen thousand French to encircle it with siege and at the same time to trap Ferrandino, who having a smaller number of men would almost certainly have been defeated. He therefore, understanding the situation, on the advice of his generals decided not to respond to the countess's requests for help. Caterina, very angry, considered herself betrayed by the Neapolitan allies and passed on the side of the French, who had devastated her lands and massacred her subjects, therefore Ferrandino, having learned the news, under a relentless downpour was forced to leave Faenza with his men and move in the direction of Cesena.

Note in this regard the chronicler forlivese Leone Cobelli that, while Ferrandino always behaved honestly, Caterina sent men behind him to rob him, albeit unsuccessfully:

Those of Bertenoro and Cesena did not want to give him more provisions: where the Duke of Calabria and he were reluctant. Now note, reader, that certainly the Duke of Calabria behaved honestly in these lands and countries, and he did not do what he could have done having become our enemy. And when he was our friend he never wanted them to be damaged either in the vineyards or in the branches, and his camp was free and those who brought him provisions wanted them to be well paid, protected and honored, and I never know of a dishonesty of that. encampment: he certainly has a good reputation for it. But we have given him well credit, for people were sent after him to steal and take away horses, weapons and robes.

— Leone Cobelli, "Cronache Forlivesi"

Charles VIII, however, preferred to avoid the Romagna and cross the Apennines, following the road of the Cisa pass. The Kingdom of Naples was conquered by the French army in only 13 days. This frightened the Italian principalities, and they formed the League of Venice against Charles VIII. Despite the numerical advantage of their opponents, the French won the engagement and Charles was able to march his army out of Italy. The numerical superiority of the Italian coalition served little purpose, the end of the day, due to a lack of organization and the ineffective use of light cavalry and infantry at Fornovo, the French King was able to withdraw to France. This time, Caterina managed to remain neutral. By not participating in the expulsion of the French, she maintained the support of both her uncle Ludovico in Milan (now legitimate Duke of Milan) and also that of the Pope.

==== Second marriage ====
Two months after the death of Girolamo, a rumour was spread that Caterina was close to marrying Antonio Maria Ordelaffi, who had started to court her. This marriage would end the claims of the Ordelaffi family on the city of Forlì. Antonio Maria, feeling confident, wrote to the Duke of Ferrara that the Countess promised to marry him. When Caterina saw how things stood, she imprisoned those who had spread the false news. These promises were addressed by the Senate in Venice, which summoned Antonio Maria to Friuli, where he remained confined for ten years.

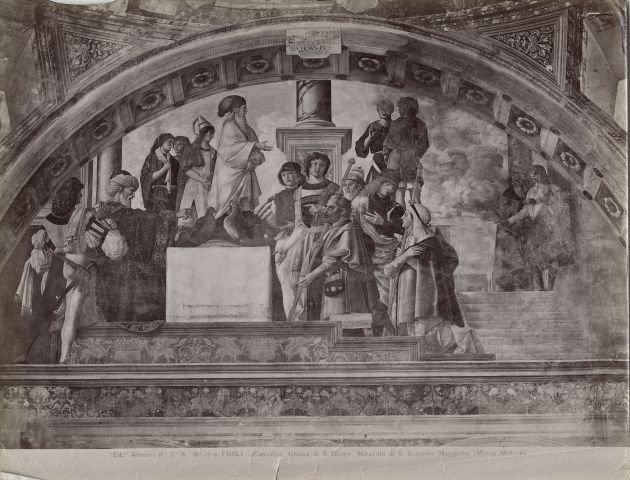
Portrait of Giacomo Feo (the tallest man standing on the right), Melozzo da Forlì

Instead, Caterina had fallen in love with Giacomo Feo, the brother of Tommaso Feo, the Girolamo's former courtiers and castellan who had remained faithful to her after the assassination of her husband. However, Giacomo was not educated or a noble. Caterina knew not to make it publicly known that she remarried after Girolamo's death. Therefore, Caterina secretly married Giacomo in 1488 to avoid losing custody of her children and the regency of her dominions.

All the contemporary chronicles reported that Caterina was madly in love with the young Giacomo. It was feared that she could strip her son Ottaviano of his future lordship, in order to give it to her lover and secret husband.

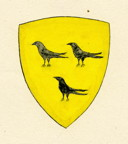
Coat of Arms of Giacomo Feo, Baron of France

Giacomo was appointed castellan of the fortress of Ravaldino in place of his brother, and was awarded with an order of chivalry from Ludovico il Moro. In April 1489, Caterina gave birth to Giacomo's son, Bernardino, later called Carlo in honour of King Charles VIII, who had made Giacomo a baron of France. Also, she had replaced the castellans of the fortresses of her dominions with her closest relatives: the fortress of Imola was given to Gian Piero Landriani, her stepfather, and the fortress of Forlimpopoli to Piero Landriani, her half-brother, while Tommaso Feo was married to Bianca Landriani, Caterina's half-sister.

At Tossignano, a conspiracy was formed to seize the fortress in the name of Ottaviano, and murder both Giacomo and Caterina. The Countess discovered the plot and imprisoned or executed those who were involved. Immediately after this conspiracy was foiled, another plot was organized by Antonio Maria Ordelaffi, who had never become resigned to the loss of Forlí, but this also failed.

Giacomo's power increased, and with his cruelty and insolence he incurred the hatred of all, including Caterina's children. On one occasion, in full view of the public, he slapped Ottaviano (the rightful Lord of Forlì), but nobody had the courage to defend the boy. After this incident, adherents of Ottaviano decided to liberate the city from the domination of Giacomo Feo. In addition, Caterina's people began to resent the wrongful influence and power that Giacomo had on Forlí.

The Florentine commissioner in Faenza, in describing to Piero de' Medici the "wretched condition to which Caterina had been reduced, completely dominated by her lover", reported that in 1493 Giacomo held the fortress of Forlì in his own hands, that all revenues and profits passed through his hands and that all the soldiers depended on him. "He rides like Lord and all his supplications are brought to him", in such a way that "one of three things must follow: either that Madonna kills Messer Jacopo, or that Messer Jacopo kills her with all her children, or growing up Let Signor Ottaviano, who proves to be courageous, kill his mother and Messer Jacopo". In short, a family massacre was envisaged: uxoricide or matricide. "So if Messer Jacopo has brains, which I'm also told that he does, it is necessary that he think about his health", i.e. that he should take steps to kill Octavian before he becomes an adult. Caterina felt such an attachment to Giacomo that she declared herself ready to kill all her children and renounce the State and all her possessions rather than separate from him: "the sooner she will bury all her people and children and possessions, the sooner they will give soul to the devil, and the state to the Turk, rather than ever forsake each other".

In Renaissance Italy, there was a difference between a "good mother" and a "cruel mother" depending on the life that a widow chose afterwards. A "good mother" would not remarry and would play both roles as a mother and a father figure to her children. A “cruel mother” would put herself and her interests above her children by remarrying. This would be considered abandonment of her children because of the consequences that the children are faced with behind a new family and new father figure from their mother remarrying. Sometimes the widow would take her dowry and actually abandon her children to the paternal kin. Along with Caterina's secret marriage to Giacomo and Giacomo's cruelty towards Caterina's children, Caterina was seemingly taking on the identity as a "cruel mother" in the eyes of Renaissance Italy. Instead of focusing on ruling Forlí, she let her relationship with Giacomo get in the way, which made her people feel uneasy. Caterina's relationship with Giacomo not only put her children in jeopardy, but also the social order of Forlì.

Gian Antonio Ghetti and some of Caterina's own children formed a conspiracy. On the evening of 27 August 1495, Caterina, Giacomo Feo, and their entourage were returning from a hunt. Caterina, her daughter Bianca Riario and some of her ladies-in-waiting rode in a carriage, followed on horseback by Giacomo, Ottaviano, and his brother Cesare and many staffieri and soldiers. Agents of the conspiracy attacked and mortally wounded Giacomo. The same day, Ghetti went to Caterina, thinking that she had secretly given the order to kill Giacomo. Caterina was unaware of the plot, and her revenge was terrible. When her first husband was murdered, she avenged his death according to the justice of the time; now she reacted with vindictive fury. She was not satisfied with mere executions: their deaths had to be among the most cruel and painful. Again, her relationship and strong feelings towards Giacomo got in the way of her thinking clearly. By using the power she had and not thinking about the consequences and what her people would think of her, Catherine even slaughtered the children, infants and pregnant women of the conspirators. Thus Marin Sanudo, who says it is "cruelest":

[...] this Madonna armed herself with all the weapons and came to where Domino Giacomo had been killed, and saw him dead, cut into a hundred pieces. And when she asked where the houses of these traitors were, she went there with certain men-at-arms and foot soldiers, and had their women taken, and had them cut into pieces, among which there were many pregnant; he also had three-year-old children killed, a very cruel thing, and against that saying of Christ that: the son will not take on himself the guilt of the father, nor the father the guilt of the son; and then he burned the houses: and the whole earth was in great terror. [...] and she had a bounty published against the conspirators, either dead or alive, who presented them to him [...] she had one hand cut off by one, then she had them quartered and put the pieces at the gates of the earth [.. .] so that she made a cruel revenge, which dampened the pain for his domino Giacomo.

— Marin Sanudo, La spedizione di Carlo VIII.

Thirty-eight people were executed for the crime—including Ghetti and his wife and children—and many others imprisoned or exiled. Caterina's fury blinded her to the politics that had inspired the plot. It had involved almost all the supporters of Ottaviano Riario, who were convinced that Caterina had given her tacit consent to the killing of the man who was considered the "usurper" of the state's rightful ruler. They had wanted to uphold the power of the Riario family. As a result of the massacre which followed the assassination of Giacomo Feo, Caterina lost, forever, the good will of her people.

==== Third marriage ====
In 1496, the ambassador of the Republic of Florence, Giovanni de' Medici il Popolano, paid a visit to Caterina. The second son of Pierfrancesco il Vecchio, he belonged to a collateral branch of the Medici family. Along with his older brother Lorenzo, he had been sent into exile because of his open hostility toward their cousin Piero, who succeeded his father Lorenzo il Magnifico in the government of Florence. In 1494, when Charles VIII invaded Italy, Piero was forced to sign a treaty which allowed the French army to move freely into the Kingdom of Naples. The people of Florence were liberated, deposed Piero and proclaimed a Republic. Giovanni and his brother were able to return to their homeland. They renounced the Medici surname and took the name of "Popolano". The Florentine government appointed Giovanni as ambassador to Forlì.

Shortly after coming to Forlì, Giovanni and his entourage were housed in the apartments adjacent to Caterina's in the fortress of Ravaldino. (Note: Fortress where Caterina had made her official residence immediately after the death of Girolamo Riario.) The rumours of a possible marriage between Giovanni and Caterina and that Ottaviano Riario had accepted the post of Condottiero from Florence threatened the Venetians, (Note: Florence and Venice were preparing for war; Venice intended to take control the city of Pisa, which Charles VIII had made independent from Florence, and to reinstate the Medici as rulers of Florence.) and alarmed the lords of the League and the Duke of Milan.

Caterina could not hide her wedding plans and her own feelings from her uncle Ludovico; she truly fell in love with the handsome, charming, and intelligent Giovanni. The situation differed from the previous one as this time Caterina had the approval of her children and she also obtained the consent of her uncle. The marriage of two people from such powerful families, however, was likely to arouse opposition, so they were wed in secret in September 1497.

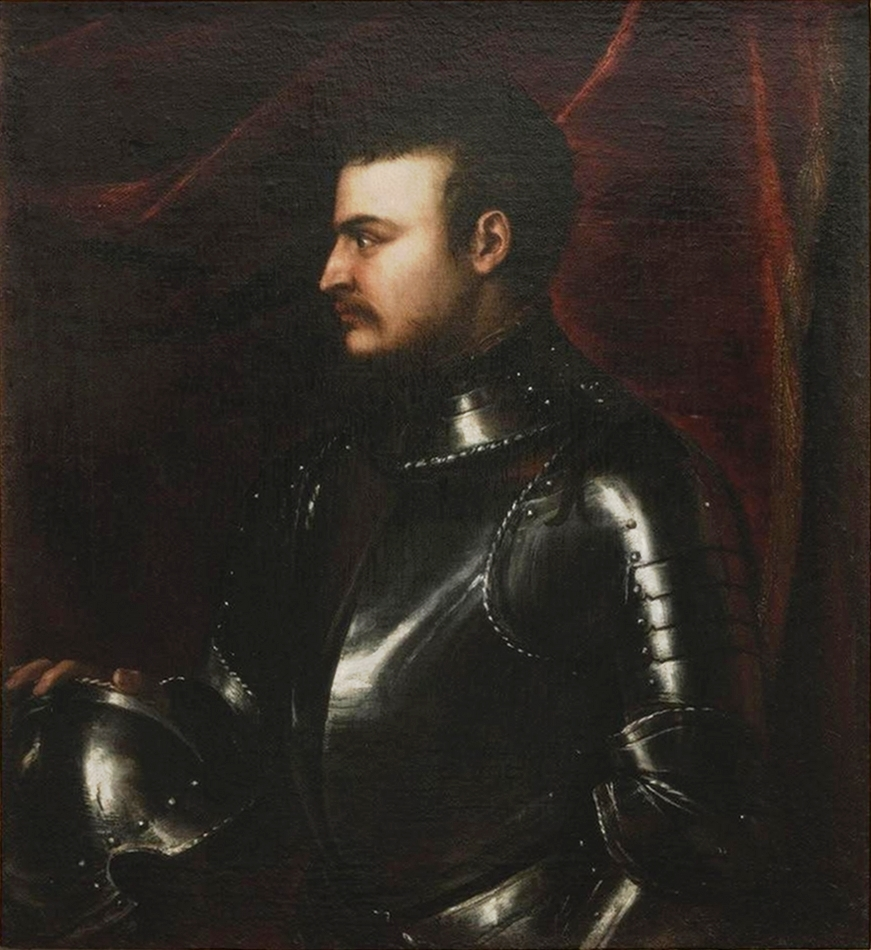
Portrait of Giovanni delle Bande Nere by Gian Paolo Pace

In April 1498, Caterina bore Giovanni a son, the last of her children. The child was baptised as Ludovico after his mother's uncle, the Duke of Milan, but later he became known by the name Giovanni delle Bande Nere.

Meanwhile, affairs between Florence and Venice were getting worse and Caterina, who occupied the main route between the two cities, prepared her defenses. She sent a contingent of knights to the aid of Florence, led by Giovanni and her eldest son, Ottaviano Riario, accompanied by men she had trained herself.

Giovanni became seriously ill and was compelled to leave the battlefield and return to Forlì. There, despite treatment, his condition deteriorated and he was transferred to Santa Maria in Bagno, where he hoped for a miraculous recovery. On 14 September 1498, Giovanni died in the presence of Caterina, who had been summoned urgently to attend him. Giovanni's death left Caterina alone to face the Borgias.

==== Defense against Venice ====
After having returned to Forlì in order to make preparations for the defense of her states, Caterina was occupied by military concerns, especially logistics. Training the militia was executed by the Countess in person. To find additional money and troops, she wrote to her uncle Ludovico, the Republic of Florence and the neighbouring states who were her allies. Only the Marquis of Mantua and Ludovico il Moro sent a small contingent of soldiers. The latter sent two very valid leaders: Fracasso and Gian Francesco Sanseverrino, but Caterina was not able to manage the grumpy and angry character of the first: she complained about it with her uncle, saying that Fracasso constantly quarreled with his brother and with the other captains, who did what he wanted and spoke badly of her; she even threatened to leave, offended by some of his words. Ludovico invited her to be patient, because, although he said "some bad words", they could not find a better leader than he was.

After an initial attack by the Venetians, which inflicted severe destruction, Caterina's army managed to outmanoeuvre them. Afterwards, the war continued with minor skirmishes until the Venetians were able to circumvent Forlì to reach Florence by another route.

Because of this staunch defence, Caterina Sforza gained the nickname of "La Tigre" ("The Tiger").

=== Capture by Cesare Borgia ===
In the meantime, Louis XII had succeeded to the French throne. Louis claimed the rights both to the Duchy of Milan as a grandson of Valentina Visconti, and to the Kingdom of Naples as heir to the House of Anjou. Before starting his campaign in Italy, Louis XII secured an alliance with Savoy, the Republic of Venice, and Pope Alexander VI. In the summer of 1499, he came to Italy with a formidable army; without having to fight a single battle, he occupied Piedmont, as well as Genoa and Cremona. On 6 October, he settled in Milan, which had been abandoned the previous month by Duke Ludovico, who fled to the Tyrol under the protection of his nephew-by-marriage Emperor Maximilian I.

Alexander VI allied himself with Louis XII in return for the King's support in establishing Alexander's son Cesare Borgia, the Duke of Valentinois, as ruler in Romagna. Alexander issued a papal bull on 9 March 1499 to invalidate the investiture of the feudal lords, including Caterina.

When the French army left Milan with Cesare to begin the conquest of Romagna, Ludovico il Moro regained the Duchy with the help of the Austrians.

Caterina sought relief from Florence against the approaching French army, but Florence was threatened by the Pope, so she was left alone to defend herself. She immediately began to recruit and train many soldiers and began to store weapons, ammunition and food. She reinforced the defenses, especially that of Ravaldino where she resided and which was already considered impenetrable. She also sent her children to Florence.

On 24 November, Cesare Borgia arrived in Imola. The city gates were opened by the inhabitants, and he was able to take possession, after having conquered the fortress where the castellan Dionigi Naldi of Brisighella had resisted for several days. After seeing what had happened there, Caterina asked the people of Forlì if they also wanted to capitulate to Borgia, or if they wanted to be defended and endure the resulting siege. Because the people hesitated in answering, Caterina absolved the citizens of Forlì of their oath of fealty, and sealed herself in Ravaldino.

On 19 December, the Duke of Valentinois took possession of Forlì and began the siege of the fortress. Caterina repeatedly refused all offers of peace, from Cesare and from Cardinal Riario. In response, Cesare offered 10,000 ducats for her, dead or alive. Caterina tried to capture Cesare when he came near the fortress to talk to her, but the attempt failed.

For several days the artillery of both factions engaged in a mutual bombardment: Caterina's cannon inflicted heavy losses on the French army, but the French artillery damaged the defences of the main fortress. What was destroyed during the day was rebuilt during the night.

Caterina's solitary resistance was admired throughout all Italy; Niccolò Machiavelli reports that many songs and epigrams were composed in her honour. All were lost except that of Marsilio Compagnon.

As time passed without decisive results, Cesare changed his tactics. His troops bombarded the walls of the fortress continuously, even at night. After six days, they opened two breaches in the walls. On 12 January 1500, his forces stormed the fortress. The bloody battle was quick and decisive, and Caterina continued to resist, fighting with weapons in hand until she was taken prisoner. Among the gentlemen who were caught together with her, was her secretary, Marcantonio Baldraccani. Immediately she surrendered herself to Antoine Bissey (the bailli of Dijon) as a prisoner of the French, as she knew there was a law that prevented French forces from holding women as prisoners of war.

According to Machiavelli, the defense operations were misdirected by Giovanni da Casale: "The poorly built fortress and the scant prudence of the defender, therefore, brought disgrace to the magnanimous enterprise of the Countess".

=== Rome ===
Cesare obtained custody of Caterina from the French general, Yves d'Allègre, promising that he would treat her not as a prisoner but as a guest. Caterina and her entourage were therefore forced to go with the army that was preparing to conquer Pesaro. The conquest had to be postponed because on 5 February Ludovico il Moro returned to Milan, forcing French troops to turn back.

Cesare departed alone with the papal army for Rome, where he took Caterina. In Rome, she was held in the Belvedere Palace. Towards the end of March, Caterina tried to escape but she was discovered and immediately imprisoned at Castel Sant'Angelo.

==== In the prison of Castel Sant'Angelo ====
To justify Caterina's imprisonment, Pope Alexander VI accused her of trying to kill him in November 1499 with letters impregnated with poison, as a response to the papal bull which had deprived the countess of her fiefdoms.

Even today it is not known if the accusation was founded or not. Machiavelli believed that Caterina had tried to poison the Pope, while other historians, such as Jacob Burckhardt and Ferdinand Gregorovius, are not certain. An inconclusive and unfinished trial took place, and Caterina remained imprisoned until 30 June 1501, when she was released by Yves d'Allègre, who had come to Rome with the army of Louis XII for the conquest of the Kingdom of Naples. Alexander VI alleged that Caterina signed documents renouncing all of her fiefs, because in the meantime his son Cesare, with the acquisition of Pesaro, Rimini, and Faenza, was appointed Duke of Romagna.

After a brief stay in the residence of Cardinal Riario, Caterina embarked from Livorno to Florence, where her children were waiting for her.

=== Florence ===
In Florence, Caterina lived in the villas which had belonged to her third husband Giovanni de' Medici, often staying at the Villa Medici di Castello. Soon, she complained of being mistreated and living in a strained financial situation.

For many years she conducted a legal battle against her brother-in-law Lorenzo de' Medici for the custody of her son Giovanni, who was entrusted to him during her imprisonment. The battle over Giovanni's custody, and inheritance, and loans with Medici continued on for four years. While she had to pay back her loans to Medici, she was able to regain guardianship of Giovani and his inheritance. In 1504, her son was finally returned to her, because the judge recognized that her confinement as a prisoner of war was not comparable to the detention of a criminal.

With the death of Pope Alexander VI on 18 August 1503, Cesare Borgia lost all his power. This reopened the possibility of restoring to power all the old feudal lords of the Romagna who had been deposed. Caterina lost no time in sending letters to adherents, and pleaded her case to Pope Julius II in her own name and that of her son Ottaviano Riario. The new Pope was favourable to restoring the lordships of Imola and Forlì to the Riarios, but the populace of both cities declared that a majority of the people opposed the return of the Countess, so that the domain passed instead to Antonio Maria Ordelaffi on 22 October 1503.

After having lost her last chance to return to her former political power with Imola and Forlì, Caterina spent the last years of her life dedicated to her children, in particular to her youngest son Giovanni (her favourite and the most like her in personality and character). She also conducted a series of experiments in alchemy, the results of which were recorded in a manuscript titled "Gli Experimenti de la Ex.ma S.r Caterina da Furlj Matre de lo inllux.mo S.r Giouanni de Medici", or "Gli Experimenti". The book, dating back to 1500, contains a total of 454 recipes, roughly 66 of which are cosmetic related, 358 medicinal, and 38 alchemical. Her experimental activities situate her at the origins of a Medici interest that stretched well into the seventeenth century.

==== Death and burial ====
In April 1509, Caterina's health declined and was stricken by a severe case of pneumonia. She appeared to have recovered, but had a relapse of the disease, after which she made her will and arranged her burial. At the age of forty-six years, "The Tiger of Forlì", who had "frightened all of Romagna", died on 28 May 1509. Her body was placed in a small tomb in the chapel of Le Murate in Florence, a convent of nuns whom Caterina had befriended during her time in that city, and where she had kept a cell as a spiritual retreat. During the 1830s, the nuns were forced to leave the property, and in 1845 it was redesigned as a prison. Sometime during this renovation, Caterina's bones disappeared.

== Appearance and personality ==
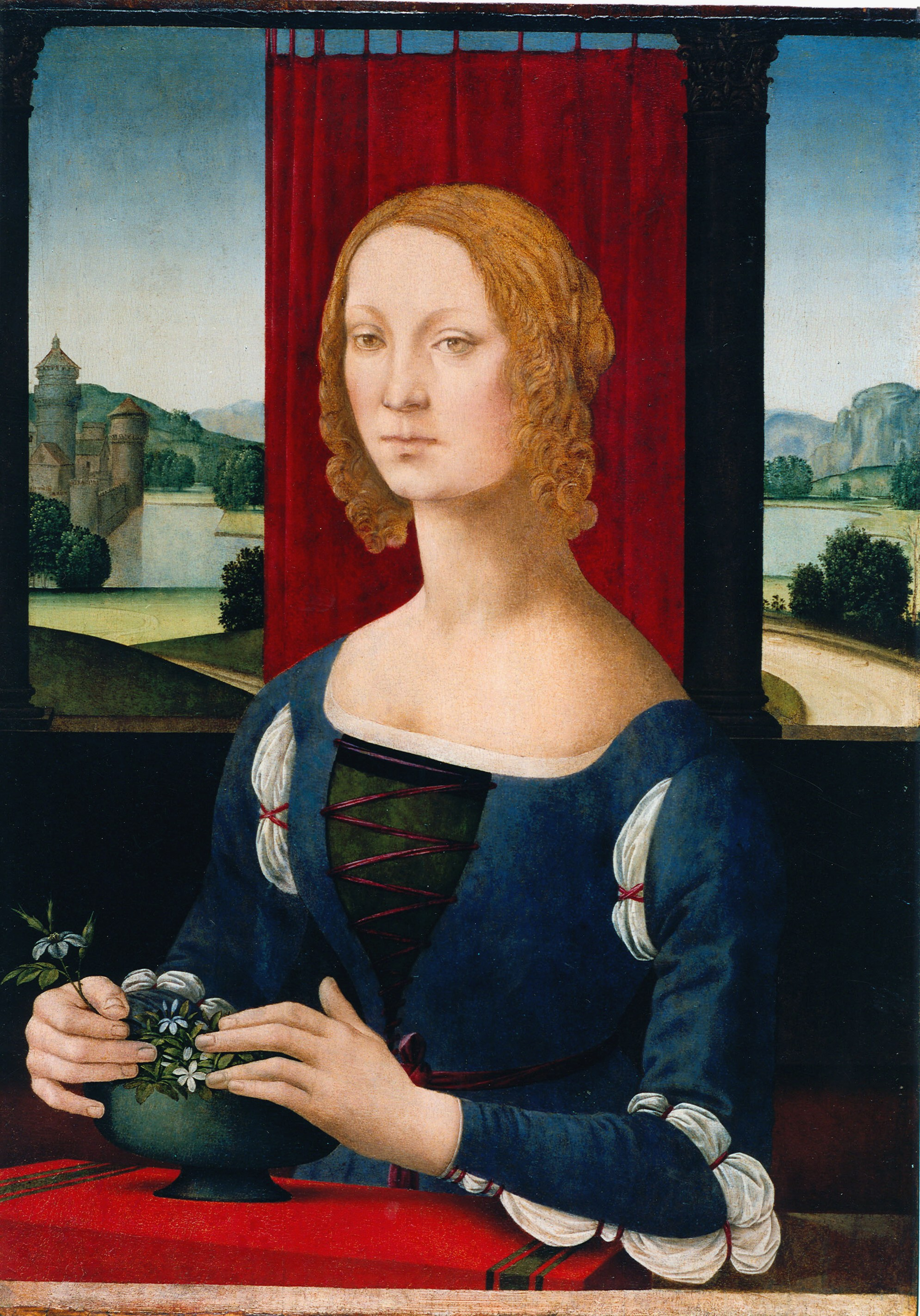
La dama dei gelsomini, by Lorenzo di Credi (Pinacoteca Civica di Forlì), presumed portrait of Caterina Sforza

This is how the Florentine historian Bartolomeo Cerretani describes her:

"She was wise, animose, great: complex, beautiful face, she spoke little. She wore a satin robe with two arms of trawl, a black velvet caper on the French, a man's girdle, and scarsella full of golden ducats; a sickle for the use of retort next to it, and among the soldiers at the foot, and on horseback was feared much, because that woman with weapons in hand was proud and cruel. She was the non-legitimate daughter of Count Francesco Sforza, (Note: She was actually his niece.) the first captain of his time and to whom she was very similar in soul and daring, and she did not lack, being adorned with singular virtue, of some vice not small nor vulgar."

Marin Sanudo called her "female almost virago, cruelest", in relation to the massacre she made of the children and pregnant women of the conspirators, following the death of her second husband Giacomo Feo.

The leader Fracasso says she is "cunning", ready to change parties on the occasion, but specifies that "to be a woman she is not without fear of her own things".

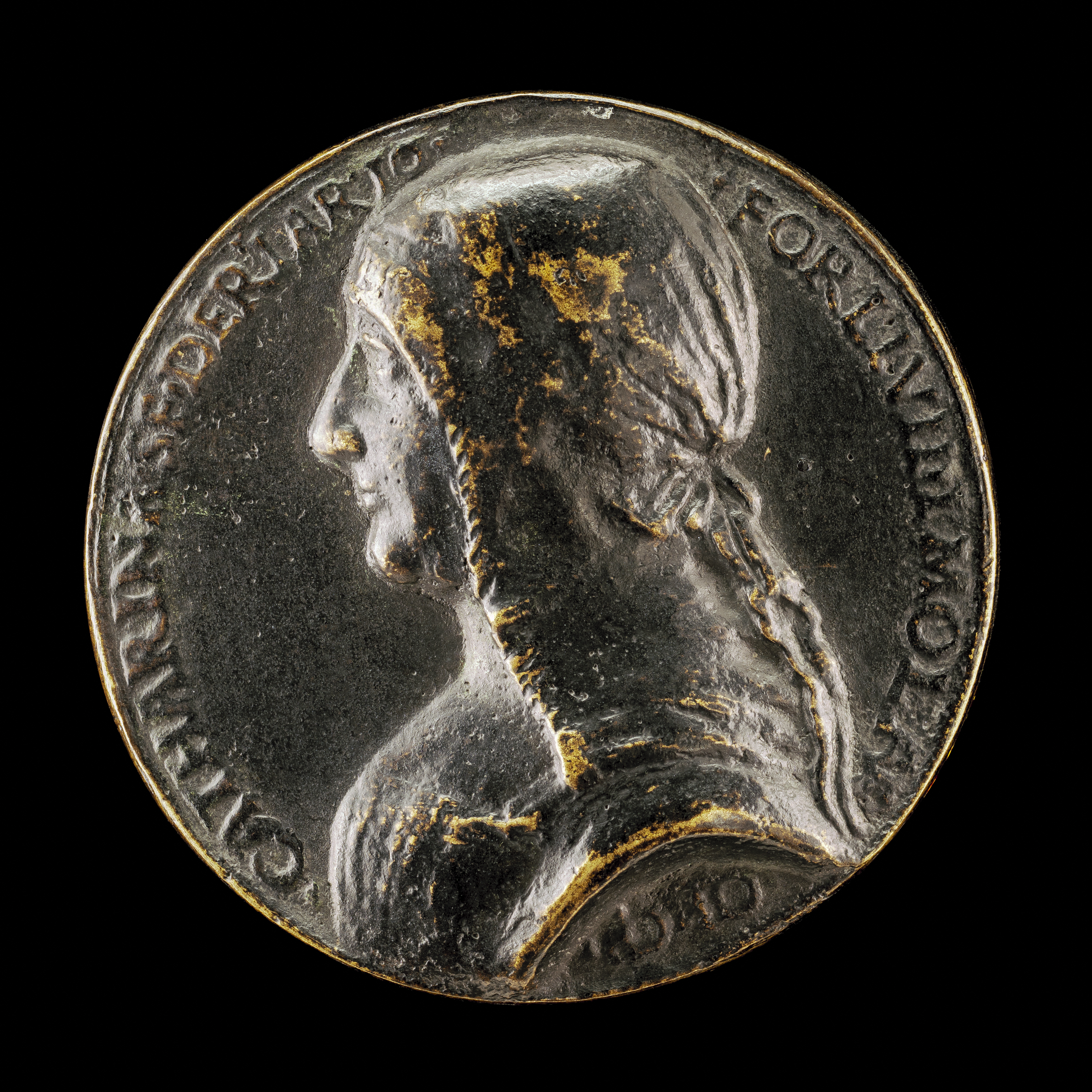
Medaglia di Caterina Sforza. Niccolò Fiorentino.

The future cardinal Bernardo Dovizi da Bibbiena, in a letter in which he narrates to Piero de' Medici the "strange takeover" of Caterina with the Duke of Calabria Ferrandino d'Aragona (which took place on 23 September 1494), described her ugly in the face, bringing back in this the impressions of Ferrandino himself. In fact, although Caterina had a reputation among posterity as a woman of great beauty, the medals of the time depict a woman with masculine traits and somewhat corpulent.

Around 1502, according to an informant of Isabella d'Este, Caterina was "so fat that I could not make the comparison". Corpulence was, moreover, very common within the Sforza family: Caterina's father Galeazzo Maria himself, to whom Caterina was very similar, did not wear the cuirass that would perhaps have saved him from death—which he went to meet—"so as not to seem too fat".

In the prime of her youth, Caterina Sforza was described as above average in height, curvaceous yet well-proportioned, and endowed with a generous bosom. She had a pale complexion, large eyes, high arched eyebrows that gave her a penetrating gaze, and a broad forehead. From her father she inherited the distinctive Sforza features: a prominent, slightly hooked nose and a strong, protruding chin. Her hair was wavy and usually tied back, and while many sources describe her as blonde and fair-skinned, it remains uncertain whether this appearance was natural or enhanced through cosmetic mixtures. However, naturally blonde hair was not uncommon in the Sforza lineage, where several members were known for their fair Northern Italian features. Caterina's appearance closely aligned with the beauty ideals of the time, which favored fair skin, light hair, and contrasting dark eyebrows in women.

== Lovers ==
Caterina was known to have had numerous lovers, although often subjects or soldiers of low social background, rough or unknown. Without love she could not live long and, when she was affected, she flared up to such an extent that she became the favorite captain of the militias, arbiter of politics and governor of the city. The most famous case is that of Giacomo Feo, for whose death she felt incredible pain. Giovanni de' Medici was also called Catherine's "favorite", although they contracted marriage. Others less known were the two brothers Polidoro and Achille Tiberti da Cesena, Giovanni da Casale (once a favorite of her uncle Ludovico il Moro), Francesco Fortunati (piovano di Cascina, canon and confessor), Ottaviano Manfredi (whom Caterina held dear, and whose murder she avenged with her customary cruelty), and Bartolomeo da Cremona known as Baccino (his last castellan of Ravaldino, to whom Caterina also left a legacy in her will).

In particular, the beautiful Giovanni da Casale is defined by Francesco Guicciardini as "a man of the most vile nation, but who came to some degree honored because in the prime of his age he had been grateful to Ludovico Sforza, and then famous for the well-known love of that Madonna [Caterina]". François de Beaucaire says of he: "He was born of an obscure place, and a homunculus of the lowest strength, since as an adolescent for the superiority of beauty he was in delights with Ludovico Sforza, he had obtained an honorable military rank". Caterina gave him full freedom of maneuver in the political events of Forlì, moreover the rumors of their relationship are present in the vast majority of contemporary sources and supported by the fact that Caterina was the only one not to reproach Casale for the loss of the fortress of Forlì. Indeed, during the siege, as Lucido Cataneo states, "the Countess ... he deprecated solum for Joanne's health more than his own."

Although according to the rumors of the time all these were undoubtedly lovers of Caterina (Giovanni da Casale himself had to deny and exonerate herself), in the opinion of her biographer, Pier Desiderio Pasolini, they were instead lovers not loved. These rumors, however, aroused the popular imagination to such an extent that there was talk of certain wells ending in sharp razors into which Catherine threw her political opponents and her old lovers after having lured them by deception.

Even Galeazzo Sanseverino, whom Caterina wanted as her fourth husband, was considered a beautiful man, and was in fact favored (much more than Giovanni da Casale) of her uncle Ludovico. Known is then the "strange embrace" with the Duke of Calabria Ferrandino d'Aragona who, being a good-looking young man and knowing the passion of the countess, presented himself to her all "tight and Neapolitan beautifully dressed", in order to earn the political alliance. Although he did not like the countess, according to one informant "they shook hands and scratched" and there was "much blinking of the eyes and shrinking of the shoulders". However, it does not seem that any carnal relationship could be consummated because the then lover of the countess, Giacomo Feo, showed himself very jealous, in fact Caterina and Ferrandino stayed together for about two hours, but "videntibus omnibus [under the eyes of all], because the Pheo wants her for himself".

== Issue ==
From her first marriage with Girolamo Riario, Caterina had six children:

- Bianca (March 1478 – 1524), married firstly in 1494, Astorre III Manfredi, Lord of Faenza (d. 1502), and secondly in 1503, Troilo I de' Rossi (d. 1521), the first Marchese di San Secondo From her second marriage, she had nine children.
- Ottaviano (31 August 1479 – 6 October 1523), Lord of Imola and Forlì (1488–99), later Bishop of Volterra and Viterbo
- Cesare (24 August 1480 – 18 December 1540), Archbishop of Pisa and Latin Patriarch of Alexandria
- Giovanni Livio (Forlì, 30 October 1484 –1496)
- Galeazzo Maria (Forlì, 4 December 1485 –Bologna, 1557), married in 1504, Maria Giovanna della Rovere (b. Senigallia, 1486 – d. Bologna 1538), Dowager Lady of Camerino, and eldest sister of Francesco Maria I della Rovere, Duke of Urbino. They had a daughter, Giulia, and a son, Giulio (d. 1565). Their descendants, who later received a ducal title, became extinct in the male line with Francesco Maria Riario della Rovere in 1676.
- Francesco, nicknamed "Sforzino" (Imola, 17 August 1487 – 1546), Bishop of Lucca

From her second marriage with Giacomo Feo, Caterina had one son:

- Bernardino, later renamed Carlo (April 1489 – 1509)

From her third marriage to Giovanni de' Medici, Caterina had one son:

- Ludovico (6 April 1498 – 30 November 1526), renamed Giovanni after the death of his father, one of the greatest condottieri of his time and a national hero, known as "Giovanni delle Bande Nere". He married Maria Salviati (17 July 1499 – 29 December 1543), the daughter of Jacopo Salviati and Lucrezia di Lorenzo de' Medici. Cosimo I de' Medici, Grand Duke of Tuscany (1519–1574) was their son.

In June 1537, 28 years after Caterina's death, her grandson Cosimo de' Medici, the only son of her own son Giovanni, became the Duke of Florence and in 1569, the Grand Duke of Tuscany. Through him, Caterina was the direct ancestress of the later Grand Dukes of Tuscany, the Dukes of Modena and Reggio, and the Kings of Spain and France.

== Legacy ==
In her book The Warrior Queens: Boadicea's Chariot, British historian Antonia Fraser presents Caterina Sforza as a contrasting figure to her contemporary Isabella I of Castile. Fraser points out that whilst the murders ordered by Caterina were no worse than the massacres ordered by Isabella, historians have been much harsher in their judgment of the former. Fraser accounts for this by pointing out that Isabella's actions were sanctioned by the Church, as they were carried out in the name of Catholicism, whilst Caterina's were motivated by the personal, secular desire to preserve her property and rights.

=== Experiments ===
Caterina Sforza had a thirst for knowledge and had interests in alchemy, cosmetics, and medicine. She crafted a manuscript containing 454 recipes, with the recipes and experiments listed in alphabetical order. The recipes within her manuscript can be divided into three categories: "Lisci" (Cosmetics), "Chimica" (Chemistry), and "Medicine" (Medicine). Some of her medicinal recipes include remedies for lice, fever, and to heal wounds. Additionally her medicinal work focused on creating quintessence and the philosopher's stone, both of which are thought to have healing and protective properties that would advance her medicinal work. She also created cosmetic recipes for perfume, and methods to lighten skin and hair. Many of the experiment's cross categories as the cosmetic and medical recipes relied on the same procedures and ingredients as the chemical recipes.

When Sforza relocated to Forlì in 1484, she continued her experiments. She had medicinal gardens constructed where she was able to develop the ingredients she needed for her recipes. Along the exterior border of the fortress, an extensive garden was developed where she could grow various fruit trees.

After her death, her manuscript was passed down to her son, Giovanni dalle Bande Nere. It was then passed down from generation to generation and stayed within the Medici family. The manuscript eventually was lost. In the 19th century, Pier Desiderio Pasolini (1844–1920), a descendant of Caterina Sforza and a historian from Ravenna, spent approximately five years acquiring documents written by Sforza. He then went on to publish the majority of her manuscript titled "Experimenti".

=== Alchemy ===
Caterina Sforza was a daughter of alchemy. She strived, as almost all alchemists did, to find the elixir of life and the philosophers stone. She created over 400 different alchemical recipes in her lifetime, from cosmetics to medicinal cures. In her Experimenti, she had procedures and recipes for many cosmetics ranging from lotions and lip colors to hair dyes. Additionally, she listed several medicinal recipes such as cures for sciatica, cancer, fevers, and coughs. While she focused on alchemy, her recipes became a foundation for historical pharmacology. According to Meredith Ray, the foremost historian on Caterina Sforza, "Caterina’s manuscript collapses boundaries between alchemy and medicine, practical and arcane, home and court." Furthermore, her letters provided evidence that there was a large network of shared information and practices between male and female alchemists.

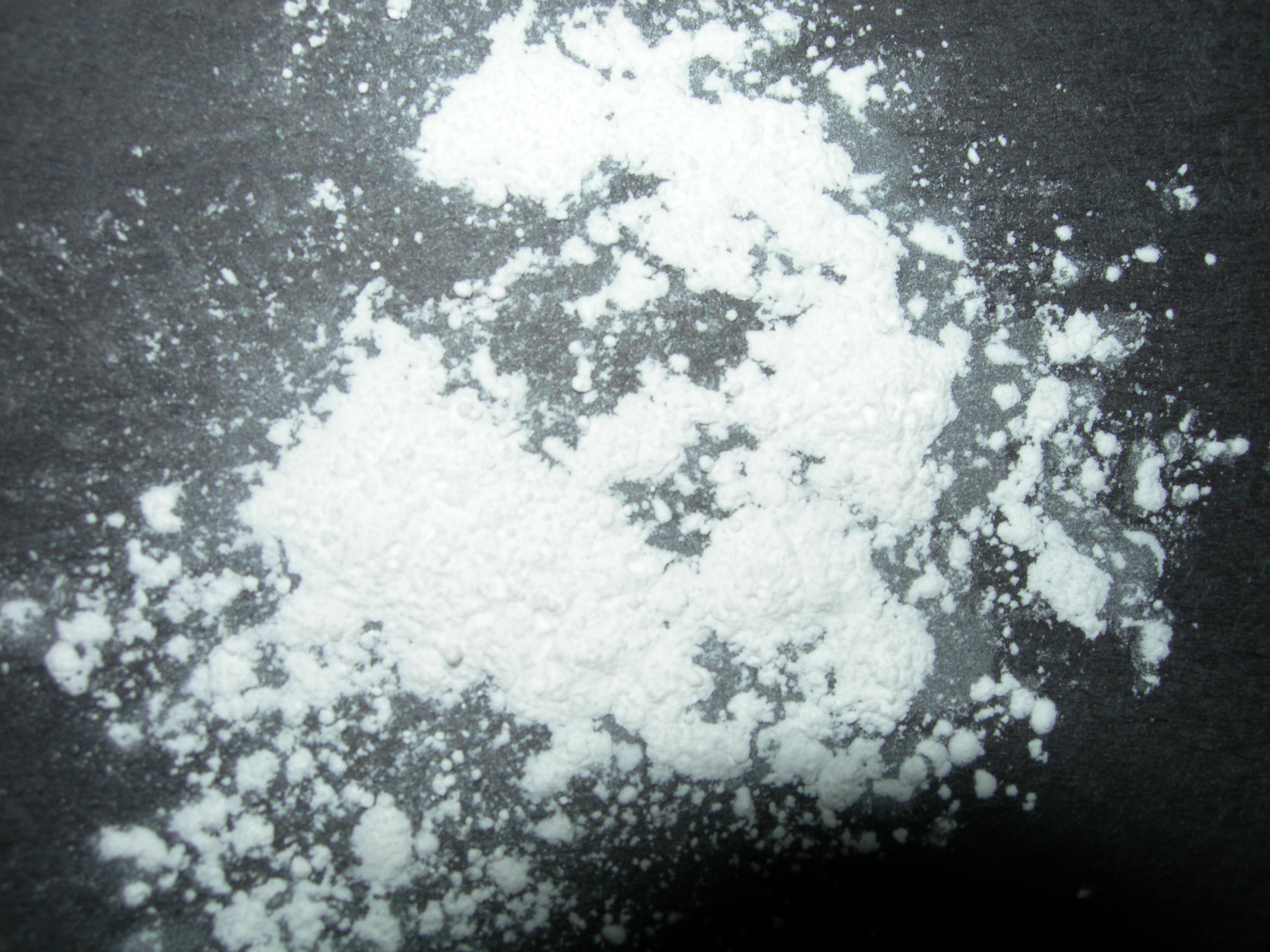
Talcum Powder

One thing she focused on across all categories of her Experimenti, was talc. Talc, or talcum, is a clay mineral that occurs naturally. She used talc in everything from cosmetics and medicine to alchemy. Her experiments show that talc could be used for making women more beautiful, a cure for poison, and turning gold to silver. While she focused a considerable amount of her work on talc, that is not all she did.

As an alchemist Caterina's manuscript has many overlaps between what is strictly medicinal and cosmetic and what is alchemy, as she incorporated it into many of the over 400 recipes wrote about. For instance she had made cosmetics such as hair dyes and lotions, and these cosmetic recipes used alchemical principles and methods for production. For example these cosmetic recipes would, "use of herbs and plants distilled in alchemical vessels", the distillation process mentioned was a foundational part of alchemy at the time, and used throughout her manuscript across all disciplines. In many places her work with medicine, becomes alchemical due to the spiritual and philosophical nature of what she was producing. For example in Experimenti Caterina wrote about was "elisir vitae, an elixir capable of conferring perpetual health and youth" which is described "principal goal of therapeutic alchemy." She claims this elixir has the ability "to raise the dead", cure the incurable, and achieve many other feats that were thought to be impossible. The instructions for this elixir written in her manuscript, "recall the principal stages of the alchemical process as described in many formal alchemical texts", and describe her using glass vessels that were used by most alchemist at the time. Using these same principles Caterina also produced a "marvelous and divine water" which would improve memory, treat Leprosy, and cure many other aches and illnesses. This water is a medicinal remedy, but is alchemical due to its extraordinary and 'divine' nature much like the "elisir vitae". Although there is overlap between all these disciplines in her writing she has other more apparent alchemy related endeavors that did not have any cosmetic or medicinal advantages. For instance Caterina was regent of Forlì and Imola, and needed to alleviate financial burden to further her political standing, so she utilized alchemy. She would make metal appear to be gold by changing its weight and color via principles of alchemy.

=== Depictions in art ===
While her role as a ruler was considered to be masculine, Caterina had series of portrait medals that embodied her diplomatic skills and political power as a successful regent. At the time, portrait medals were important among the noble society and could be distributed and exchanged as a way to communicate self-presentation, characteristic, and accomplishments of that person. Caterina's first medal represented her beauty, womanly virtue, and conformity to the female role as a noble wife and mother. When Girolamo died, Caterina's next medal represented loyalty and protection of her family with her new position as a chaste widow. While it was feminine, it was also clearly masculine because it represented her additional powerful position as a regent.

A 2023 study brings to the forefront and supports the so far little-followed hypothesis that she was represented allegorically in the form of the Lady with an Ermine painted by Leonardo da Vinci.

== In Machiavelli ==
Caterina is one of the few women discussed by Machiavelli at length, specifically regarding the legend of her having shown her genitalia after regaining the fortress of Ravaldino. Machiavelli, "who had occasion to treat with Sforza on behalf of Florence [...] [describes] how Sforza, in response to her foes' threats to kill her hostage children, lifted her skirts, pointed to her genitalia, and retorted that she could make more."

Machiavelli describes the incident and its context as follows:

Some conspirators of Furli [sic] killed the Count Girolamo, their lord, and took his wife and children, who were of tender age, prisoners. Believing, however, that they could not be secure if they did not obtain possession of the castle, which the castellan refused to surrender, the Lady Catharine, as the Countess was called, promised to the conspirators to procure its surrender if they would allow her to enter it, leaving them her children as hostages. Upon this pledge the conspirators consented to let her enter the castle; but no sooner was she within than she reproached them for the murder of the Count, and threatened them with every kind of vengeance. And to prove to them that she cared not for her children, she pointed to her sexual parts, calling out to them that she had wherewith to have more children. Thus the conspirators discovered their error too late, and suffered the penalty of their imprudence in perpetual exile.

However, this account "would appear to have originated with Machiavelli", and is not based on historical fact. He retold the story on multiple occasions, first in his Discourses on Livy (written around 1517), and then in his Florentine Histories (completed in 1526). Machiavelli himself describes the affair differently in his Florentine Histories, omitting the skirt raising incident and instead simply stating that Catherine threatened her enemies "with death and every kind of torture in revenge for the murder of her husband; and upon their menacing her with the death of her children, she said she had the means of getting more."

However, "the narrative of Machiavelli cannot stand against the absolute silence of such contemporaries as [Leone] Cobelli and [Bruno] Bernardi", neither of whom mention the skirt incident as Machiavelli describes it, and instead talk about the wisdom and political astuteness of Caterina, who is confronted with a losing situation yet manages to regain the upper hand. In all of these accounts she responds to the threats against her children with words instead of actions. She mentions how her eldest son is somewhere safe and that she is at that moment pregnant. The pregnancy is believed to have been a ruse, but with the conspirators not having any reinforcements and Caterina's forces approaching, with her children's usefulness as hostages rendered meaningless, and facing threats of vengeance for the murder of her husband, they had no choice but to retreat. Caterina would later on exact her vengeance on all the parties involved.

Returning to Machiavelli, according to Julia L. Hairston in her journal article Skirting the issue: Machiavelli's Caterina Sforza, his addition of the skirt tale, "being rather more theatrical than contemporary chroniclers of the incident describe" it, seems to have been for dramatic effect, to defeminize her by recounting the atypical behavior of a woman and a mother, and also to separate this action as a response towards the threat to her children and to instead attribute it to sentiments of indifference. In her biography of Caterina Sforza, The Tigress of Forli, Elizabeth Lev proposes that Machiavelli's account of the matter, being quite vulgar, may in fact have reflected his own dislike of Caterina, as Machiavelli had met the countess as a young diplomat and had not fared well. His "portrait of Sforza served to cement the enduring public image of her as a Renaissance virago who had defiantly preferred losing her children to losing her state." According to Italian politician and author Pier Desiderio Pasolini, "Catherine's admirable defence of the Castle of Forli soon became a sort of epopee, adorned by popular fancy and enriched by the boastful additions of those who had taken part in it. It was this version that reached Machiavelli, who was only to make Catherine's personal acquaintance eleven years later: he believed it, and delighted in handing it down to history in its most cynical form."

== In fiction ==
- In the 2005 novel The Borgia Bride by Jeanne Kalogridis, Caterina befriends the novel's main protagonist, Sancha of Aragon, while both women are imprisoned in the Castel San Angelo. Both plot the downfall of Pope Alexander Borgia and his murderous son Cesare.
- Caterina is the subject of the 2010 historical novel Scarlet Contessa, by Jeanne Kalogridis.
- In the 2011 Showtime series The Borgias she is portrayed by Gina McKee; the show takes significant dramatic liberties with the details surrounding the siege undertaken in the name of Alexander VI. Her capture by Cesare Borgia is the final episode of Season 3, which was also the last-ever episode due to the show's cancellation.
- In the series Borgia, also known as Borgia: Faith and Fear, she is portrayed by Valentina Cervi.
- In the third season of the television series Medici, she appears as a young woman, married to her first husband, the major antagonist Girolamo Riario. She is portrayed by Rose Williams.
- Caterina Sforza appears as a minor character in the 2009 historically set video game Assassin's Creed II and its novelization, Assassin's Creed: Renaissance. She plays a larger role in "The Battle of Forlì" downloadable content pack, wherein she is aided in the titular battle by the game's protagonist Ezio Auditore. Caterina also appears in the 2010 sequel game Assassin's Creed: Brotherhood and its novelization, as a love interest to Ezio Auditore. Three missions are dedicated to Ezio rescuing her from her imprisonment in the Castel Sant'Angelo.
- A fictionalised account of Caterina Sforza's capture by Cesare Borgia features in Sarah Dunant's 2013 novel Blood & Beauty.
- Caterina also loosely inspires the Grand Theft Auto III Era character Catalina, who appears in both GTA III and Grand Theft Auto: San Andreas.

== See also ==
- House of Sforza
