= Imola =

- Comune
- Comune di Imola
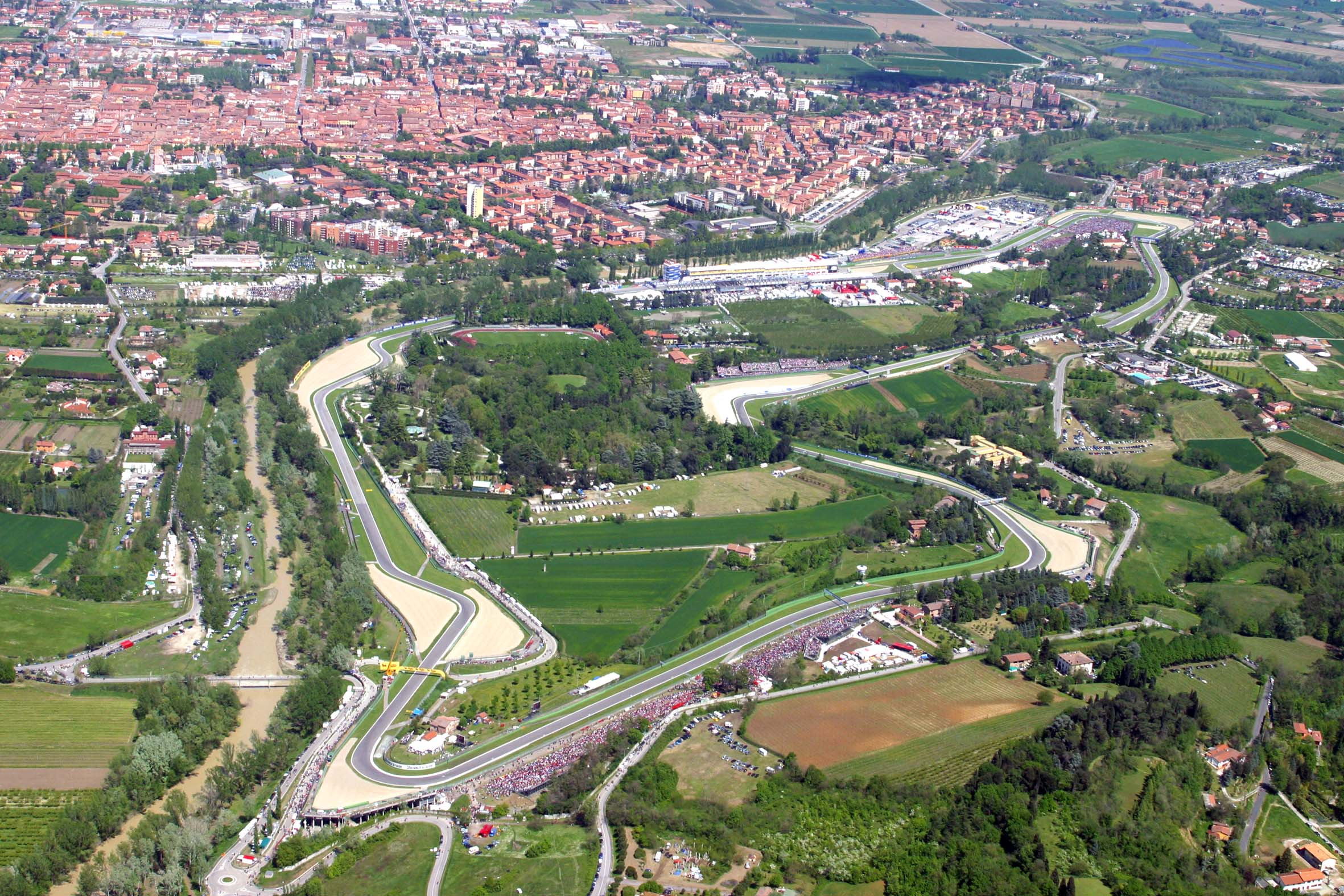
- Panoramic view of Imola and the Imola Circuit

- Flag Coat of arms

- Location within Italy Location within Emilia-Romagna
- Coordinates: 44°21′11″N 11°42′53″E
- Country: Italy
- Region: Emilia-Romagna
- Metropolitan city: Bologna (BO)
- Frazioni: Cantalupo, Càsola Canina, Chiusura, Fabbrica, Giardino, Linaro, Montecatone, Piratello, Ponticelli, San Prospero, Sasso Morelli, Selva, Sesto Imolese, Spazzate Sassatelli, Zello

Government
  - Mayor: Marco Panieri (PD)

Area
  - Total: 204.96 km^{2} (79.14 sq mi)
- Elevation: 47 m (154 ft)

Population (31 August 2022)
  - Total: 69,332
  - Density: 338.27/km^{2} (876.12/sq mi)
- Demonym: Imolesi
- Time zone: UTC+1 (CET)
  - Summer (DST): UTC+2 (CEST)
- Postal code: 40026
- Dialing code: 0542
- ISTAT code: 037032
- Patron saint: St. Cassian
- Saint day: August 13
- Website: Official website

Imola (Italian: [ˈiːmola]; Romagnol: Jômla or Jemula) is a city and comune in the Metropolitan City of Bologna, located on the river Santerno, in the Emilia-Romagna region of northern Italy. The city is traditionally considered the western entrance to the historical region Romagna.

The city is best-known as the home of the Autodromo Enzo e Dino Ferrari which hosts the Formula One Emilia Romagna Grand Prix and formerly hosted the San Marino Grand Prix, named after the independent nation of San Marino around 100 km to the south.

== History ==
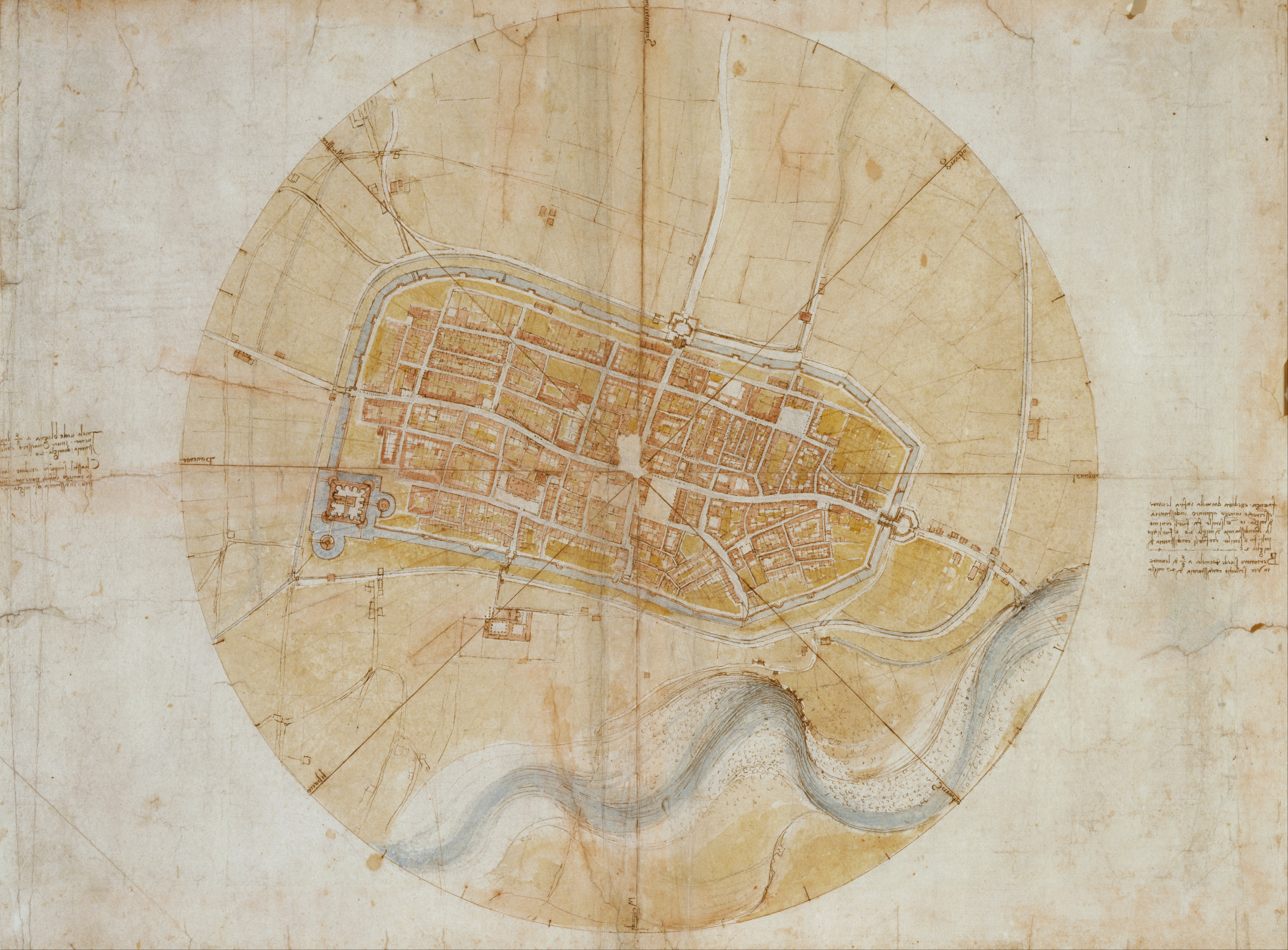
Leonardo da Vinci's very accurate map of Imola, created for Cesare Borgia during the Renaissance

Sometime around 82 BCE, the Roman dictator L. Cornelius Sulla founded the city, which was originally known eponymously in ancient times as Forum Cornelii ("Forum of Cornelius"). The city was an agricultural and trading centre, famous for its ceramics.

The name Imola was first used in the 7th century by the Lombards, who applied it to the fortress (the present Castellaccio, the construction of which is attributed to the Lombard Clefi), whence the name passed to the city itself. According to Paul the Deacon, Imola was in 412 the scene of the marriage of Ataulf, King of the Visigoths, to Galla Placidia, daughter of Emperor Theodosius the Great. In the Gothic War (535–552), and after the Lombard invasion, it was held alternately by the Byzantines and barbarians.

With the exarchate of Ravenna, it passed under papal authority. In the ninth century, Fausto Alidosi defended the city against the Saracens and Hungarians. In the tenth century, Troilo Nordiglio acquired great power. This and the following centuries witnessed incessant wars against the Ravennatese, the Faentines and the Bolognese, as well as the internecine struggles of the Castrimolesi (from Castro Imolese, "castle of Imola") and the Sancassianesi (from San Cassiano). Amid these conflicts, the republican constitution of the city was created. In the contest between pope and emperor, Imola was generally Ghibelline, though it often returned to the popes (e.g. in 1248). Several times, powerful lords attempted to obtain the mastery of the city (Alidosi, 1292; Maghinardo Pagano, 1295). Pope Benedict XII turned the city and its territory over to Lippo II Alidosi with the title of pontifical vicar, the power remaining in the family Alidosi until 1424, when the condottiero Angelo della Pergola, "capitano" for Filippo Maria Visconti, gained the supremacy (see also Wars in Lombardy). In 1426 the city was restored to the Holy See, and the legate (later Cardinal) Capranica inaugurated a new regime in public affairs.

Various condottieri later ruled in the city, such as the Visconti; several landmark fortresses remain from this period. In 1434, 1438, and 1470, Imola was conferred on the Sforza, who had become dukes of Milan (Lombardy). It was again brought under papal authority when it was bestowed as dowry on Caterina Sforza, the bride of Girolamo Riario, nephew of Pope Sixtus IV. Riario was invested with the Principality of Forlì and Imola. This proved advantageous to Imola, which was embellished with beautiful palaces and works of art (e.g. in the cathedral, the tomb of Girolamo, murdered in 1488 by conspirators of Forli). The rule of the Riarii, however, was brief, as Pope Alexander VI deprived the son of Girolamo, Ottaviano, of power, and on 25 November 1499, the city surrendered to Cesare Borgia. After his death, two factions, that of Galeazzo Riario and that of the Church, competed for control of the city. The ecclesiastical party was victorious, and in 1504 Imola submitted to Pope Julius II. The last trace of these contests was a bitter enmity between the Vaini and Sassatelli families.

In 1797, the revolutionary French forces established a provisional government at Imola. In 1799, it was occupied by the Austrians, and in 1800, it was united to the Cisalpine Republic. After Napoleon's defeat in 1815, The Congress of Vienna returned Imola to the papacy, where it would remain until joining itself to the rapidly expanding Kingdom of Sardinia in 1860 (which became the Kingdom of Italy the following year).

== Climate ==
Climate data for Imola (1991–2020)
Month	Jan	Feb	Mar	Apr	May	Jun	Jul	Aug	Sep	Oct	Nov	Dec	Year
Mean daily maximum °C (°F)	7.4 (45.3)	10.1 (50.2)	15.1 (59.2)	19.0 (66.2)	23.8 (74.8)	28.5 (83.3)	31.4 (88.5)	31.2 (88.2)	25.8 (78.4)	19.6 (67.3)	12.9 (55.2)	8.2 (46.8)	19.4 (67.0)
Daily mean °C (°F)	3.8 (38.8)	5.6 (42.1)	9.9 (49.8)	13.4 (56.1)	17.9 (64.2)	22.3 (72.1)	24.8 (76.6)	24.7 (76.5)	20.0 (68.0)	15.0 (59.0)	9.4 (48.9)	4.7 (40.5)	14.3 (57.7)
Mean daily minimum °C (°F)	0.2 (32.4)	1.0 (33.8)	4.6 (40.3)	7.9 (46.2)	12.0 (53.6)	16.2 (61.2)	18.3 (64.9)	18.2 (64.8)	14.2 (57.6)	10.4 (50.7)	5.9 (42.6)	1.2 (34.2)	9.2 (48.5)
Average precipitation mm (inches)	40.3 (1.59)	50.8 (2.00)	53.9 (2.12)	62.5 (2.46)	65.8 (2.59)	54.4 (2.14)	34.8 (1.37)	44.7 (1.76)	70.6 (2.78)	81.6 (3.21)	85.0 (3.35)	61.9 (2.44)	706.3 (27.81)
Source: Arpae Emilia-Romagna

== Demographics ==
Historical population

Year	Pop.	±%
1861	26,313	—
1871	29,157	+10.8%
1881	30,246	+3.7%
1901	33,144	+9.6%
1911	35,597	+7.4%
1921	37,718	+6.0%
1931	39,855	+5.7%
1936	41,525	+4.2%

Year	Pop.	±%
1951	45,350	+9.2%
1961	51,289	+13.1%
1971	57,224	+11.6%
1981	60,661	+6.0%
1991	62,567	+3.1%
2001	64,348	+2.8%
2011	67,892	+5.5%
2021	69,551	+2.4%

Source: ISTAT

== Tourism ==
Imola is increasingly recognized as a multifaceted tourist destination combining motorsports, cultural heritage, natural landscapes, and culinary experiences. The city is part of the Imola–Faenza tourism district, which promotes sustainable and integrated tourism across the Emilia-Romagna region.

=== Autodromo Enzo e Dino Ferrari ===
One of Imola’s most renowned attractions is the Autodromo Internazionale Enzo e Dino Ferrari, home to major motorsport events such as the Formula 1 Emilia-Romagna Grand Prix, European Le Mans Series, and WorldSBK. Guided tours are available throughout the year, offering access to areas such as the paddock, pit lane, and the Ayrton Senna memorial. Visitors can choose between classic walking tours or narrated bus tours that include a lap around the circuit.

In April 2025, the venue hosted the 6 Hours of Imola endurance race, attracting over 65,000 spectators. The race was won by Ferrari drivers Antonio Giovinazzi, Alessandro Pier Guidi, and James Calado.

=== Cultural and Environmental Events ===
The city hosts several festivals and public events that integrate the local landscape, sustainability, and performing arts. Among them:

- In Mezzo Scorre il Fiume ("The River Runs Through It") is a summer festival celebrating music, nature, and environmental education through open-air concerts and community workshops.
- Imola Green, held at the Autodromo, is a public exhibition focused on sustainable mobility, featuring electric vehicles, talks on green innovation, and local eco-businesses.

=== Gastronomy and Wine Tourism ===
Imola is known for its culinary heritage and offers various food experiences throughout the year:

- Il Piatto Verde is an annual event dedicated to the culinary use of medicinal herbs. It includes contests between chefs, public tastings, and themed dinners featuring regional ingredients.
- Guided food tours in the historic center offer tastings of traditional specialties like garganelli pasta, Romagna salumi, local cheeses, and Sangiovese wine.

=== Countryside and Wine Experiences ===
In the surrounding hills, visitors can explore vineyards and natural areas through:

- Tractor-pulled vineyard tours in Oriolo dei Fichi, combining scenic rides with local wine tastings.
- Summer coach excursions that connect the Romagna coast with the hills, including stops at local wineries and the Autodromo.

== Sport ==
The main sport venue in Imola is the Imola Circuit, which was opened in the 1950s and holds many racing events every year. The circuit has hosted Formula One in the 1980 Italian Grand Prix, from 1981 to 2006 as part of the San Marino Grand Prix and from 2020 as part of the Emilia Romagna Grand Prix. The city has dedicated multiple memorials and public spaces to Ayrton Senna and Roland Ratzenberger, who lost their lives at the circuit during the 1994 San Marino Grand Prix. The death of Senna was an event that shocked the sporting world and led to heightened Formula One safety standards.

The city has hosted multiple international and national cycling events like the 1968 UCI Road World Championships, 2020 UCI Road World Championships and 2021 Italian National Road Race Championships.

The city has two professional basketball teams, Virtus Imola (founded in 1936) and Andrea Costa Imola (founded in 1967). Both of them play in the "PalaRuggi" sports hall.

The city's professional soccer team, Imolese Calcio 1919, plays in a stadium located inside the Circuit, "Stadio Romeo Galli".

The city has two swimming pools and from 2020 until 2024 will host the Italian Federal breaststroke swimming training center.

== Main sights ==
- Autodromo Enzo e Dino Ferrari (Imola Circuit), an internationally renowned motor racing circuit located in the southern part of the town. It hosts the Formula One Emilia Romagna Grand Prix and various other motorsport events throughout the year.
- Rocca Sforzesca (Sforza Castle), built under the rule of Girolamo Riario and Caterina Sforza. Today, it houses the Cinema d'Estate, an open-air cinema that shows films in July and August. It is also home to the world-renowned International Piano Academy "Incontri col Maestro", founded in 1989 by Franco Scala.
- Palazzo Tozzoni (Tozzoni Mansion), constructed between 1726 and 1738 by architect Domenico Trifogli. Since 1981, it has served as a civic art museum.
- Duomo (Cathedral), dedicated to San Cassiano. Erected between 1187 and 1271, it has undergone multiple restorations over the centuries. A major renovation was carried out from 1765 to 1781, while the current façade dates to 1850.
- Convento dell'Osservanza, which includes the church of San Michele (1472), later expanded with a convent and two cloisters. It contains the sarcophagus of Lucrezia Landriani (1496), mother of Caterina Sforza. The interior features a nave and aisles completed in 1942, and a fresco attributed to Guidaccio da Imola (1472). In the apse is a 15th-century Byzantine-style crucifix. The first cloister, dating to 1590, originally included 35 frescoes depicting the life of St. Francis, of which 15 have been lost. In the adjoining garden is a notable Pietà in terracotta, attributed to the late 15th-century Bolognese or Faenza school.
- Santuario della Beata Vergine del Piratello and the adjoining Cimitero del Piratello. On 27 March 1483, a pilgrim named Stefano Manganelli reportedly witnessed a miracle at Piratello, in which a vision of the Madonna requested that the people of Imola build her a shrine. This led to the founding of a monastery and the construction of the Santuario della Beata Vergine. The monastery was dissolved during the Napoleonic suppressions in the early 1800s. The Cimitero del Piratello was authorized in 1817 and opened several years later, occupying the former convent cloisters adjacent to the sanctuary. It was designated a basilica by Pope Pius XII in 1954. The cemetery was further expanded in 1916 with the addition of the Campo Monumentale.

Other buildings include the Farsetti and the Communal palaces. In the latter is a fresco representing Clement VII and Charles V (1535) passing through the city. The public library was established in 1747 by the Conventual priest Setti. In the 16th century, the Accademia degli Industriosi flourished.

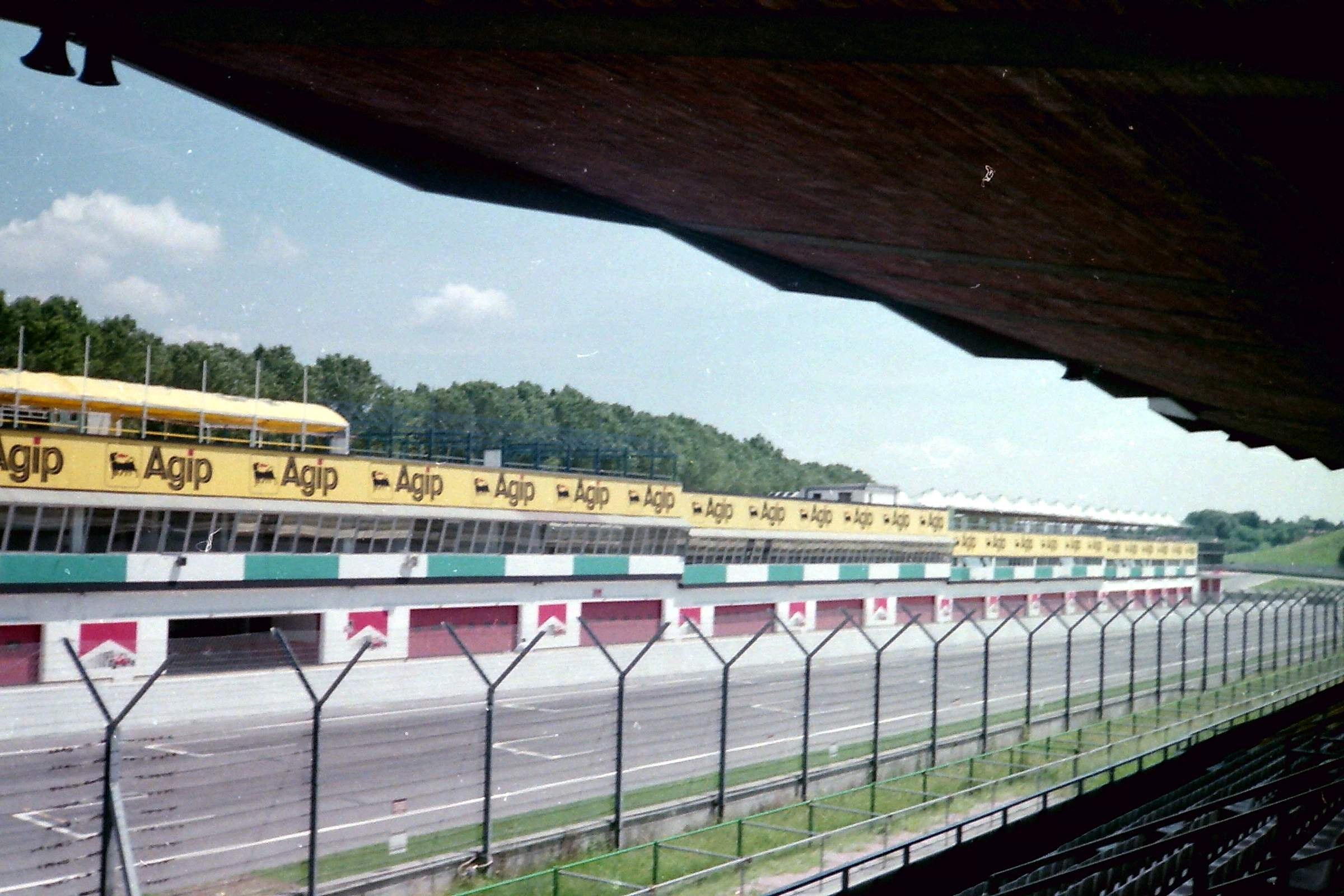
Main straight and pit lane of the Imola Circuit (1998)

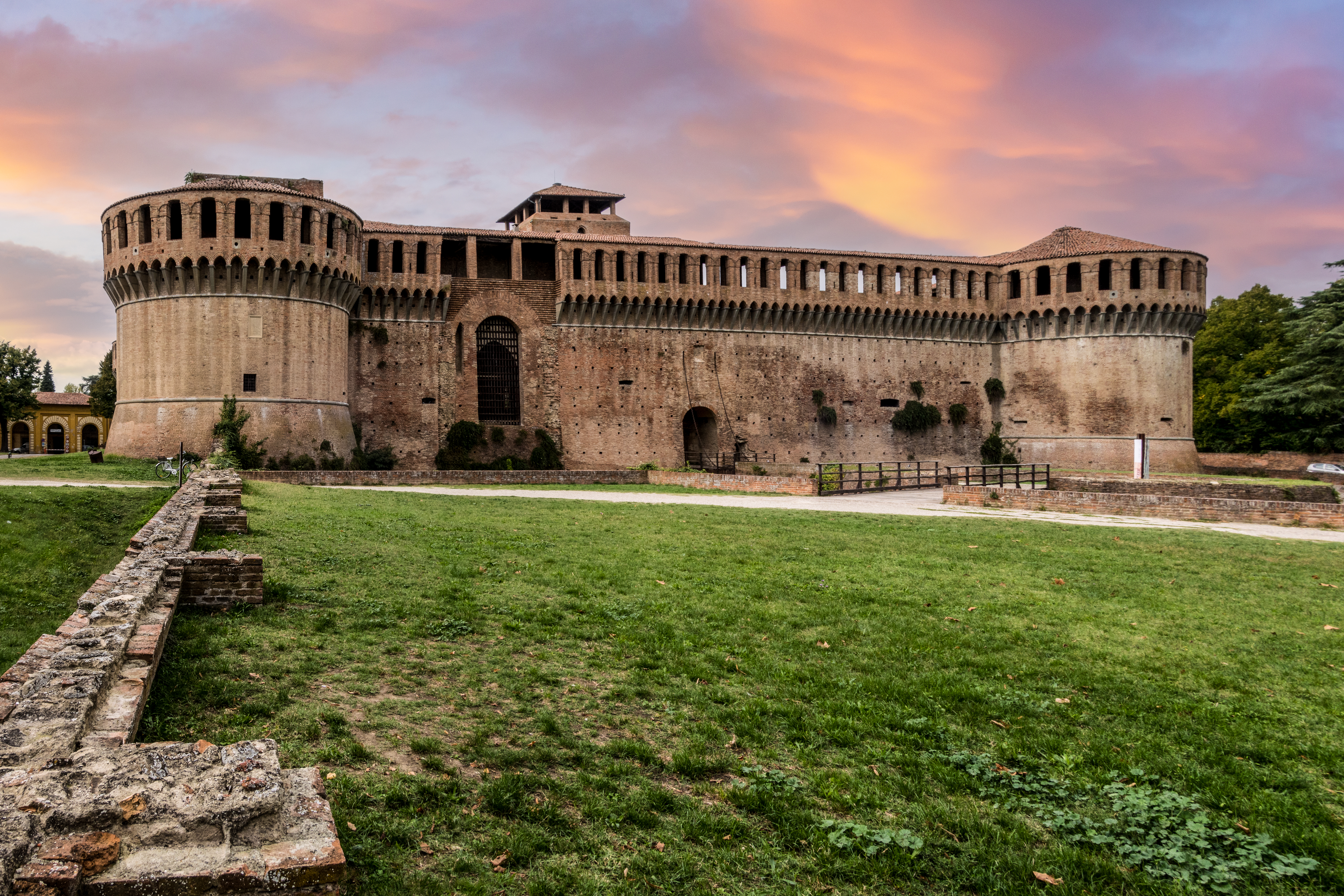
The Rocca Sforzesca of Imola

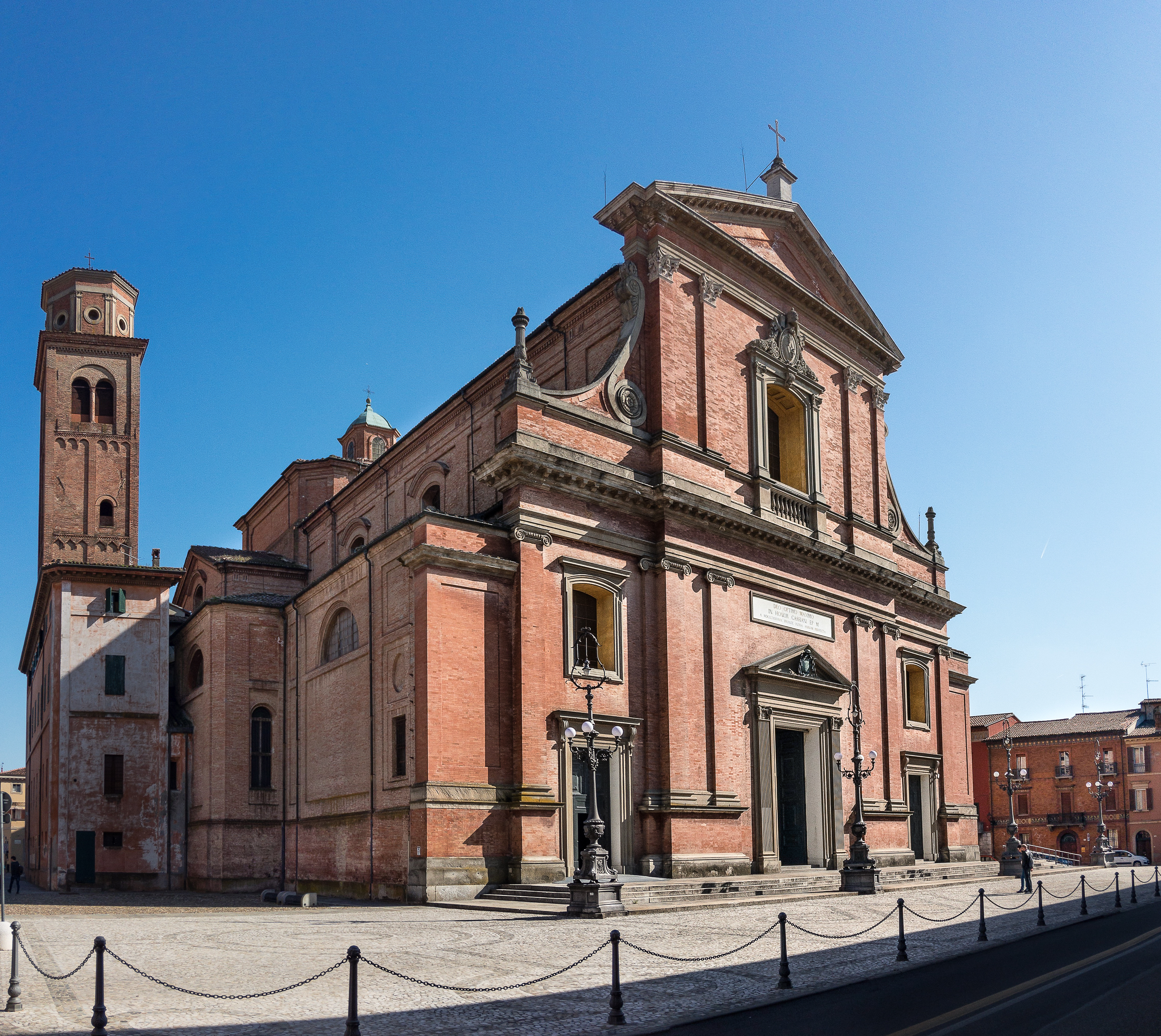
The Cathedral of Imola, seat of the Bishopric of Imola

=== Green areas ===
- The Acque Minerali Park, located next to Santerno river, on the hills of the city. The park was established in the early 20th century; the discovery of mineral water occurred in 1830.
- The Tozzoni Park, located on a big hilly area on the side of the city; it became a public area in 1978. The Tozzoni family bought the park in 1882 and used it as a hunting reserve, naming it "Parco del Monte" (Italian: "Park of the Mountain").

== People ==
- Pope Honorius II (1124–1130), born Lamberto Scannabecchi
- Antonio Maria Valsalva, anatomist who founded the anatomy and physiology of the ear
- Benvenuto Rambaldi da Imola, a lecturer on Dante at the University of Bologna in the 14th century
- Gedaliah ibn Yahya ben Joseph (c. 1515 – c. 1587) (Hebrew: גדליה בן יוסף אבן יחייא), a talmudist born at Imola
- Luca Ghini, scientist of the 16th century who founded the first botanical garden (Orto botanico) at the University of Pisa and the Bologna.
- Giuseppe Scarabelli, 19th century geologist, palaeontologist and politician
- Vincenzo Dal Prato, castrato singer, for whom the role of Idamante was written by Mozart
- Cosimo Morelli, the architect who designed the sacristy of St. Peter's, Rome
- Giuseppina Cattani (1859–1914), Italian microbiologist
- Innocenzo di Pietro Francucci da Imola, painter, a pupil of Francia and Gaspare Sacchi, distinguished painters, nicknamed after his birthplace
- Saint Hippolytus of Rome, author
- According to tradition, Saint Cassian of Imola was a teacher and martyr there during the reign of Emperor Julian the Apostate in the 4th century.
- Saint Peter Chrysologus, who was a deacon there
- Andrea Costa, politician, considered to be among the founders of the Italian Socialist Party.
- Fausto Gresini, who ran a successful MotoGP team
- Stefano Domenicali, former Team Principal of Ferrari Formula One Racing Team and current CEO of the Formula One Group.
- Quinto Cenni, painter and illustrator
- Cincinnato Baruzzi, sculptor
- Gabriele Lancieri, racing driver

== Medals and awards ==
- On 12 June 1984, Imola was awarded the Medaglia d'Oro al Valor Militare (Gold Purple Heart) for the role of the city in the Italian resistance movement
- On 2 June 1971, the city was awarded the Medaglia d'oro ai benemeriti della scuola della cultura e dell'arte (Gold Merit Badge of the Art and Culture School).

== Twin towns – sister cities ==
Imola is twinned with:

- Colchester, United Kingdom
- Gennevilliers, France
- Piła, Poland
- Pula, Croatia
- Weinheim, Germany
- Ardakan, Iran
- Zalău, Romania

== See also ==
- Bishopric of Imola
