= Girolamo Riario =

Italian Lord (1443–1488)

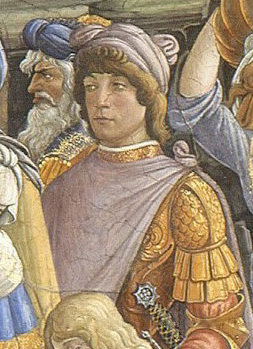
- Count Girolamo Riario

Lord of Imola
- In office 1473–1488
- Preceded by: Taddeo Manfredi
- Succeeded by: Ottaviano Riario

Count of Forlì
- In office 1480–1488
- Preceded by: Sinibaldo II Ordelaffi
- Succeeded by: Ottaviano Riario

Personal details
- Born: 1443 Savona, Republic of Genoa
- Died: 14 April 1488 (aged 44–45) Forlì, Papal States
- Cause of death: Assassination
- Spouse: Caterina Sforza
- Children: Bianca; Ottaviano; Cesare; Giovanni Livio; Galeazzo Maria; Francesco "Sforzino"; Scipio (natural son)
- Parents: Paolo Riario; Bianca Della Rovere

Girolamo Riario (1443 – 14 April 1488) was Lord of Imola (from 1473) and Count of Forlì (from 1480). He served as Captain General of the Church under his uncle Pope Sixtus IV. He was one of the organizers of the failed 1478 Pazzi conspiracy against the Medici family, the rulers of Florence, and was assassinated 10 years later by members of the Forlivese Orsi family.

== Biography ==
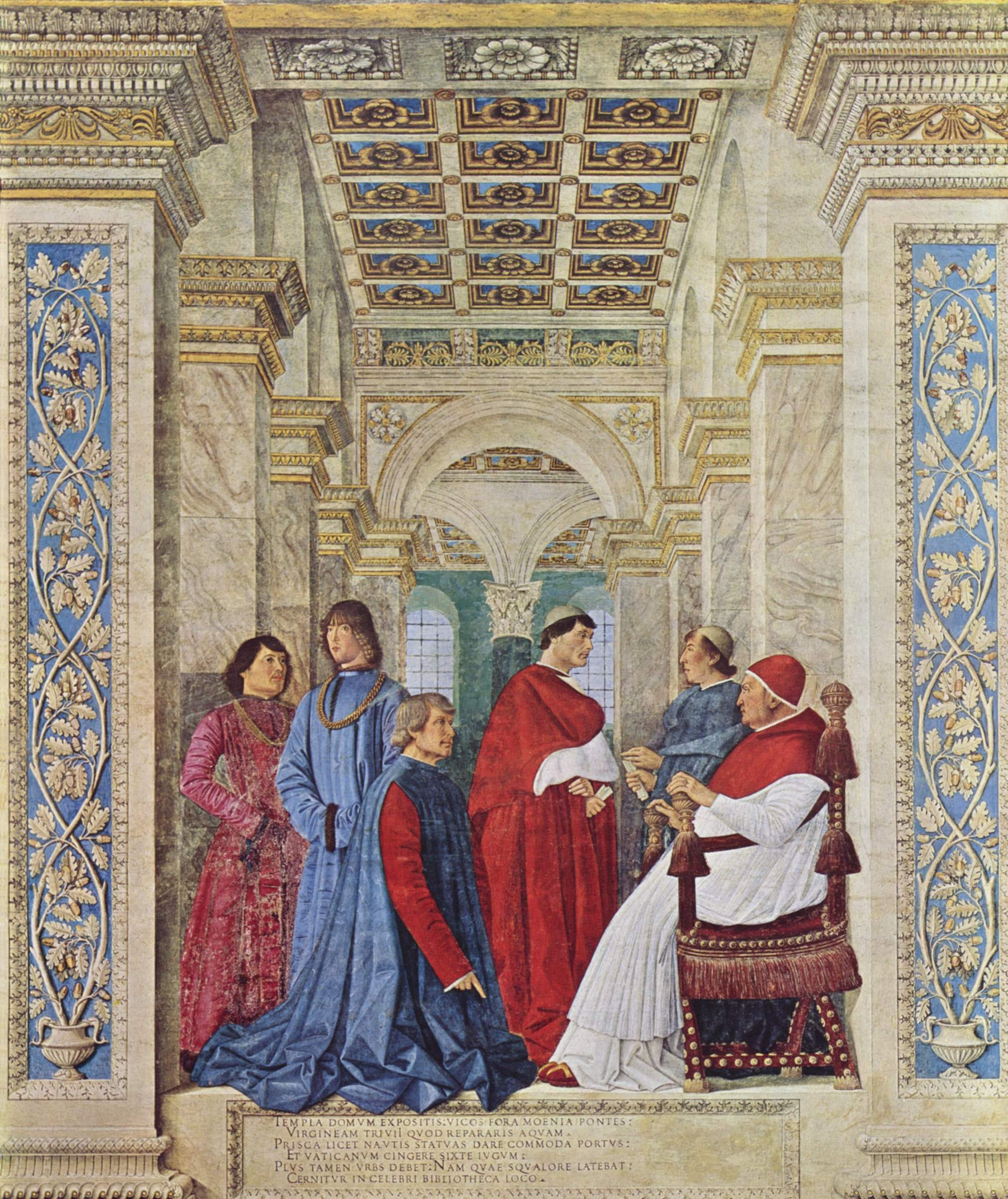
Pope Sixtus IV with his nephews and courtiers. Girolamo Riario is the second figure from the left.

Born in Savona, Riario was the son of Paolo Riario and Bianca della Rovere. He was a nephew of Pope Sixtus IV, who in 1473 granted him the seignory of Imola, as a dowry for his marriage with Caterina Sforza (daughter of Galeazzo Maria Sforza, Duke of Milan). In 1471, he was also appointed Captain General of the Church.

In 1478, he was one of the plotters behind the Pazzi conspiracy, a plan to assassinate the two most prominent members of the Medici family in Florence. In addition to conspiring, he was an intended beneficiary once Lorenzo and Giuliano de' Medici had been killed, as it would have made Riario the Lord of Florence. However, only Giuliano was killed, leaving Lorenzo still in power.

=== Count of Forlì ===
In 1480 the pope made Girolamo Riario Count of Forlì, confiscating the lordship from the Ordelaffi. At Forlì, Riario erected the fortress of Rocca di Ravaldino, one of the most strategically important strongholds of the Romagna. He also rebuilt much of the town of Imola, tearing down old and decayed houses.

During his uncle's pontificate, Riario mostly resided with his wife in Rome. In 1484, he started a conflict with the Colonna family, whose landed property Sixtus IV wished to take over. In the course of this feud he had the papal protonotary, Lorenzo Colonna, arrested and tortured to death, a deed which provoked much enmity against his family in the city.

After the death of Pope Sixtus IV, Riario, as commander of the papal forces, returned to Rome with his wife Caterina. She entered the Castel Sant' Angelo with troops in order to put pressure on the cardinals to elect a candidate conformable to the Riarios' interests. After 10 days of chaos in Rome, Riario concluded with the terrified cardinals that he would withdraw his troops and his wife's occupation of the castello in return for 7,000 ducats in cash. Caterina first did not follow this scheme, but after two days had to give in to what her husband had negotiated; only then the conclave could start.

== Death ==
Riario promoted several further plots against the Medici, none of which were successful, leaving Riario as the only remaining conspirator of the Pazzi conspiracy alive in 1488. Riario was eventually assassinated in a conspiracy led by two members of the Orsi family from Forlì, supposedly over a financial dispute. On 14 April, Checco and Ludovico Orsi entered the government palace, and one of them attacked Riario with a sword. Despite the presence of the Count's guards, a total of nine assassins slashed Riario to death, eventually flinging his corpse into a local piazza, where a crowd gathered in support of the assassins. The assassins then proceeded to loot the palace.

Although assassinations were not altogether uncommon in Renaissance Florence, they still had repercussions. Despite writing to Lorenzo de' Medici, who no doubt approved of the result of the assassination, the conspirators received no written support by the Medici family. Support, both military and popular, eventually sided with Riario's widow, and the Orsi brothers fled, taking what they could with them. Their remaining assets and family were soon destroyed by angry mobs.

Riario's body had been recovered from the piazza by a local friar, and once Riario's widow proved vindicated, she had the body cleaned up and laid in state for three days in the church of San Francesco.

== Issue ==
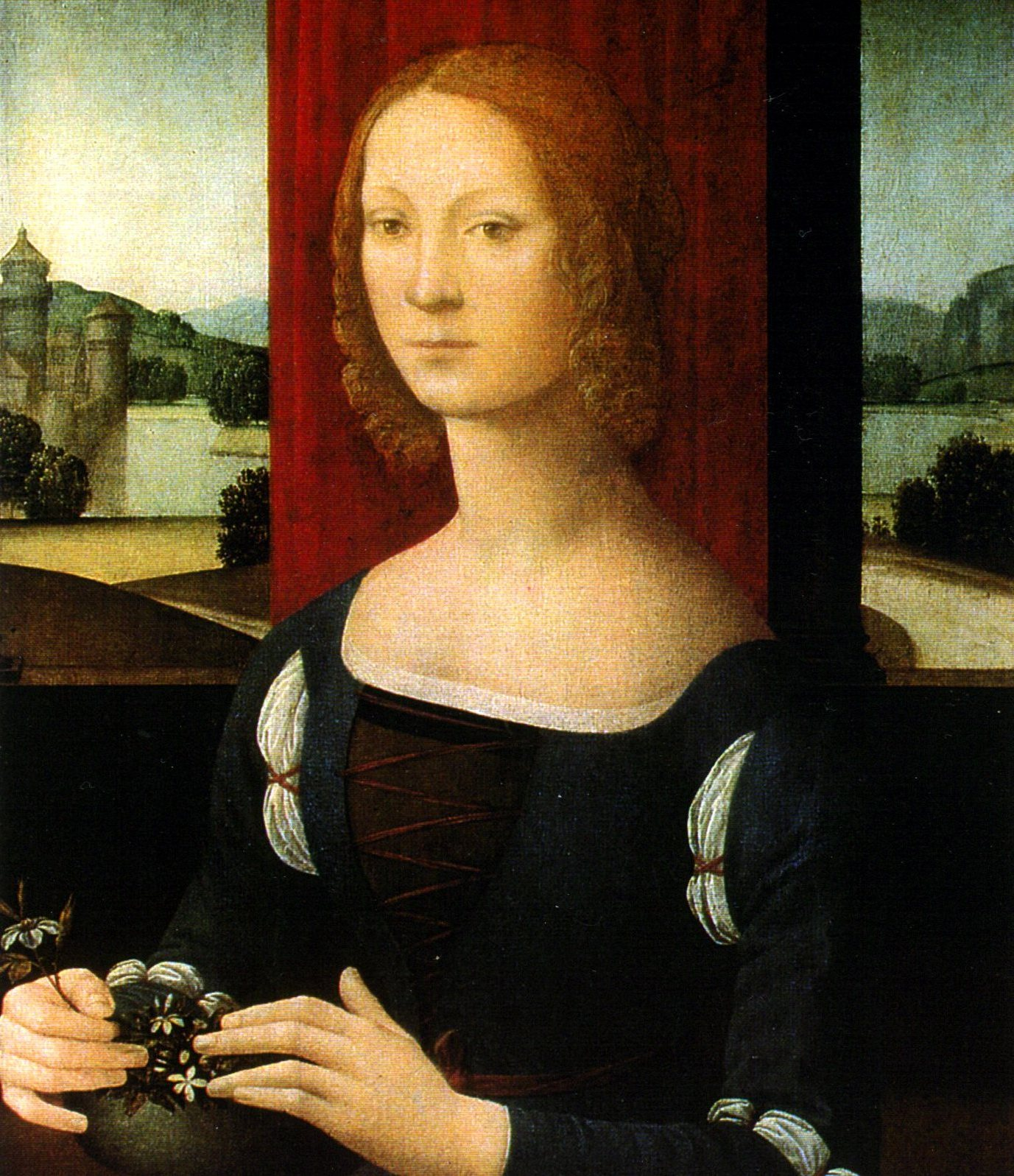
La dama dei gelsomini by Lorenzo di Credi. Portrait of Girolamo's wife Caterina Sforza.

By his wife, Caterina Sforza, he had six children:

- Bianca (March 1478 – 1524), married firstly in 1494, Astorre III Manfredi, Lord of Faenza (d. 1502), and secondly in 1503, Troilo I de' Rossi (d. 1521), the first Marchese di San Secondo From her second marriage, she had nine children.
- Ottaviano (31 August 1479 – 6 October 1523), Lord of Imola and Forlì (1488–99), later Bishop of Volterra and Viterbo.
- Cesare (24 August 1480 – 18 December 1540), Archbishop of Pisa and Patriarch of Alexandria.
- Giovanni Livio (Forlì, 30 October 1484 –1496)
- Galeazzo Maria (Forlì, 4 December 1485 – Bologna, 1557), married in 1504, Maria Giovanna della Rovere (b. Senigallia, 1486 – d. Bologna 1538), Dowager Lady of Camerino, and eldest sister of Francesco Maria I della Rovere, Duke of Urbino. They had a daughter, Giulia, and a son, Giulio (d. 1565). Their descendants, who later received a ducal title, became extinct in the male line with Francesco Maria Riario della Rovere in 1676.
- Francesco, nicknamed "Sforzino" (Imola, 17 August 1487 – 1546), Bishop of Lucca.

By an unknown woman, he had a natural son:

- Scipio Riario

== In popular culture ==
- Riario is mentioned in the 2009 video game Assassin's Creed II as one of the Pazzi conspirators and a member of the Templar Order. After discovering her husband's affiliations, Caterina Sforza hires the Orsi brothers to kill him, though they later turn on her and lead their troops in an attack on Forlì.
- In W. Somerset Maugham's 1898 novel The Making of a Saint, the events surrounding Girolamo and Caterina in Forlì are described through the eyes of a political opponent.
- Riario is the main antagonist in the historical fiction TV series Da Vinci's Demons, where he is portrayed by Blake Ritson.
- Riario is also the principal antagonist in Martin Woodhouse's Medici trilogy, a historical romance revolving around Leonardo da Vinci's military exploits for the Medici.
- Riario is the principal antagonist in the third season of the Netflix series Medici, played by Jack Roth. In the show, he is assassinated in Rome immediately after the papal election, having been betrayed by Catarina.

== Citations ==
Preceded by Taddeo Manfredi	Lord of Imola; 1474–1488	Succeeded by Caterina Sforza
Preceded by Francesco V Ordelaffi	Count of Forlì; 1480–1488	Succeeded by Caterina Sforza
