= Lucrezia Landriani =

Italian noble

- Born: c. 1440; Milan, Duchy of Milan (now in Italy)
- Died: c. 17 August 1507
- Spouses: Cristoforo Lampugnani; Count Gian Piero Landriani
- Partner(s): Galeazzo Maria Sforza, Duke of Milan
- Children: Piero Landriani; Bianca Landriani; Carlo Sforza; Caterina Sforza; Chiara Sforza; Alessandro Sforza

Lucrezia Landriani (born c. 1440 – living 17 August 1507) was the mother of Caterina Sforza, Lady of Imola, Countess of Forlì. Lucrezia had three other children by the Duke of Milan, and two by her second husband.

== Biography ==
Lucrezia was born in Milan around 1440. A contemporary portrait of Lucrezia painted by Domenico Veneziano, shows her to have been quite beautiful, with blonde hair, blue eyes, a high forehead, and fine features.

Around 1450 Lucrezia married Cristoforo Lampugnani, son of Lucrezia Visconti and Giovanni Andrea Lampugnani. Later, she married Count Gian Piero Landriani, a courtier at the ducal court and a close friend of Galeazzo Maria Sforza (24 January 1444 – 26 December 1476), son of Francesco Sforza, Duke of Milan and Bianca Maria Visconti, Duchess of Milan. Galeazzo Maria would become Duke of Milan upon the death of his father on 8 March 1466.

She bore her husband Gian Piero two children: a son, Piero Landriani, who later became castellan of the fortress of Forlimpopoli, and a daughter, Bianca Landriani, who married Tommaso Feo, castellan of Ravaldino Castle and the brother-in-law of Caterina Sforza.

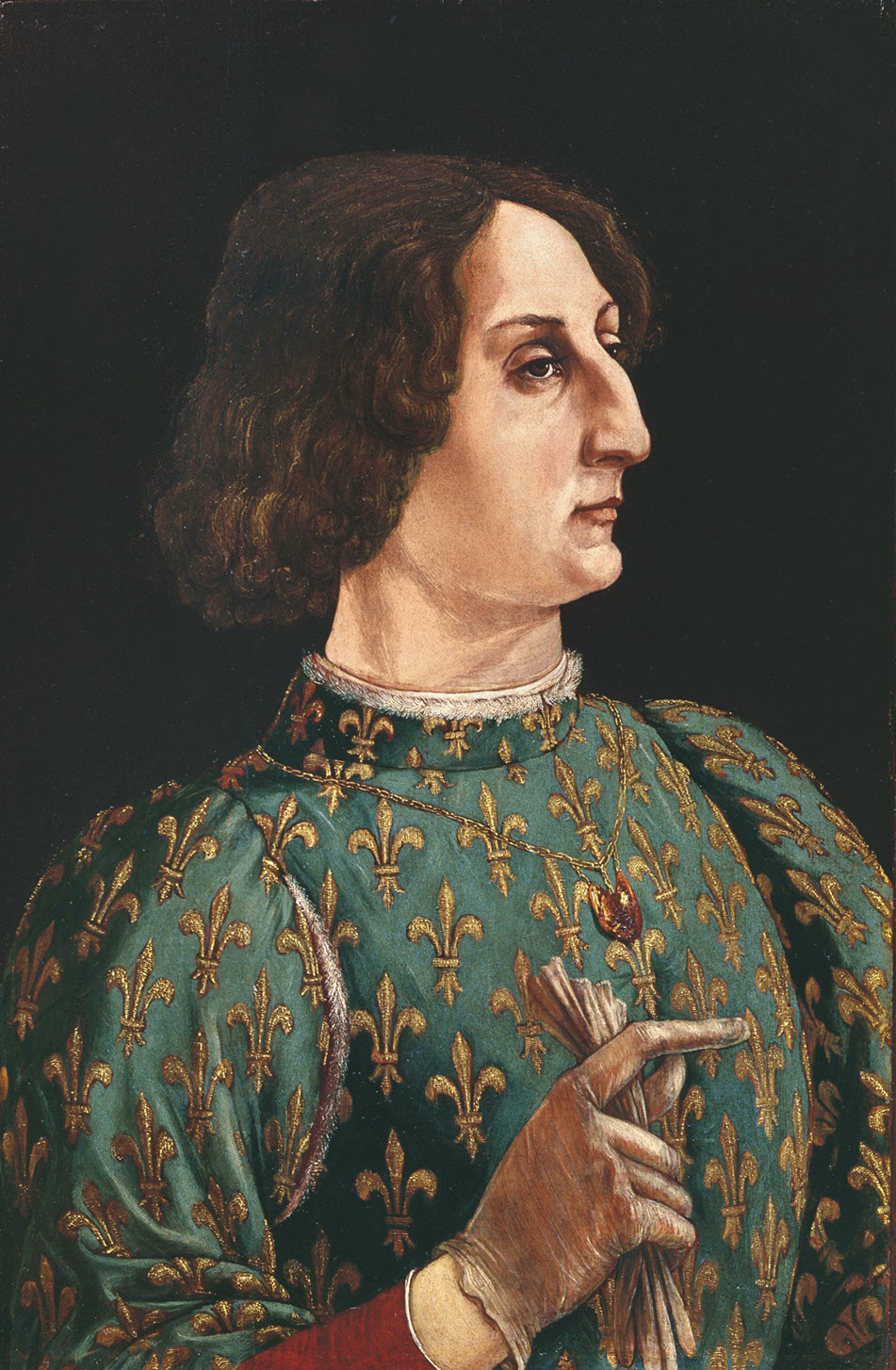
Portrait of Galeazzo Maria Sforza, Duke of Milan, the father of four of Lucrezia's children

She also had four children by Galeazzo Maria Sforza, the Duke of Milan:

- Carlo Sforza (1461-1483), later Count of Magenta, married Bianca Simonetta, father of Ippolita Sforza and Angela d'Este
- Caterina Sforza, Lady of Imola, Countess of Forli (early 1463 – 28 May 1509), married three times.
- Alessandro Sforza, Lord of Francavilla (1465–1523), married Barbara dei Conti Balbiani di Valchiavenna, by whom he had a daughter, Camilla.
- Chiara Sforza (1467–1531), married firstly, Pietro, Count dal Verme di Sanguinetto, Lord of Vigevano, and secondly, Fregosino Fregoso, Lord of Novi, by whom she had issue.

== Bibliography ==
- Jansen, S. (17 October 2002). The Monstrous Regiment of Women: Female Rulers in Early Modern Europe. Springer. p. 311. ISBN 9780230602113.
