= D'Arcy (surname) =

D'Arcy or D'arcy is a surname, and may refer to:

- Adam D'Arcy (born 1985), Australian former rugby union footballer
- Alexander D'Arcy (1908–1996), Egyptian-American actor
- Anthony D'Arcy (born 1958), Australian rugby union footballer
- Antoine d'Arcy, (died 1517), French soldier, sieur de la Bastie
- Archie D'Arcy (1870–1919), New Zealand rugby union footballer
- Arnold D'Arcy (born 1933), English footballer
- Barbara D'Arcy (1928–2012), American interior designer
- Bill D'Arcy (born 1939), Australian politician
- Brian D'Arcy (born 1945), Irish Passionist priest and writer
- Camille D'Arcy (1879–1916), American stage and silent film actress
- Cecil D'Arcy (1850–1881), New Zealand soldier
- Charles D'Arcy (1859–1938), Church of Ireland Archbishop of Armagh
- Christopher D'Arcy (born 1940), Canadian publisher and political figure
- Constance Elizabeth D'Arcy (1879–1950), Australian obstetrician and gynaecologist
- Daisy D'Arcy (born 2002), Australian rules footballer
- David D'Arcy, Australian cricketer of the 1860s
- Dennis D'Arcy (born 1951), Scottish footballer
- Ella D'Arcy (1857–1937), British short fiction writer
- Emma D'Arcy (born 1992), British actor
- Eric D'Arcy (1924–2005), Catholic archbishop
- Frank D'Arcy (1946–2024), English professional footballer
- Gemma D'Arcy (1983–1990), British chronic myeloid leukaemia victim
- George Abbas Kooli D'Arcy (1818–1885), British soldier and colonial administrator
- Gerard D'Arcy-Irvine (1862–1932), Anglican bishop
- Gordon D'Arcy (born 1980), Irish rugby union player
- Hugues d'Arcy (died 1352), Archbishop of Reims (1351–1352)
- Hugh Antoine d'Arcy (1843–1925), French poet and writer, and film executive in the US
- Jake D'Arcy (1945–2015), Scottish actor
- James D'Arcy (born 1975), British actor
- James D'Arcy-Evans (born 1935), cricket umpire
- Jan D'Arcy (born 1939), American television and film actress
- Jean d'Arcy (died 1344), French bishop
- Jim D'Arcy (born 1954), Irish politician
- Jim D'Arcy (socialist) (1919–2001), British socialist
- Jimmy D'Arcy (1921–1985), Northern Irish footballer
- John D'Arcy, several people
- Kathy D'Arcy, Irish poet and feminist activist
- Laurie D'Arcy (born 1947), New Zealand sprinter
- Leslie D'Arcy (1899–1975), Australian politician,
- Liam D'Arcy-Brown (born 1970), British sinologist and travel writer
- Marcus D'Arcy, Australian film editor
- Margaretta D'Arcy (1934–2025), Irish actress, writer and activist
- Martin D'Arcy (1888–1976), English Roman Catholic priest and philosopher
- Matthew d'Arcy (died c.1997), Irish chef
- Matthew Peter D'Arcy (1821–1889), Irish politician
- Michael D'Arcy (1934–2024), Irish politician
- Michael W. D'Arcy (born 1970), Irish politician
- Nick D'Arcy (born 1987), Australian swimmer
- Patrick D'Arcy (1598–1668), Irish nationalist and politician during the Irish Confederate Wars
- Patrick d'Arcy (1725–1779), Irish mathematician
- Ray D'Arcy (born 1964), Irish television and radio presenter
- Roy D'Arcy (1894–1969), American film actor
- Ryan D'Arcy (born 1972), Canadian neuroscientist and entrepreneur
- Sarah D'Arcy (born 1991), Australian rules footballer
- Sarah-Jane D'Arcy (born 1977), Australian swimmer
- Steven K. D'Arcy, Canadian attorney and judge
- Terry D'Arcy, American politician
- Thomas D'Arcy, Canadian singer and songwriter
- Tommy D'Arcy (1932–1985), Scottish footballer
- Tony D'Arcy (died 1940), Irish Republican Army volunteer who died on hunger strike
- Victor d'Arcy (1887–1961), British sprinter
- William D'Arcy, several people

== See also ==
- Darcy (surname)
- Darcey (surname)
