= Orci (surname) =

Orci is a surname. Notable people with the surname include:

- J. R. Orci (born Jorge Richard Orci in 1975), Mexican television writer and producer
- Jorge Astiazarán Orcí (born 1962), Mexican politician, mayor of Tijuana
- Juan Adolfo Orcí Martínez (born 1955), Mexican politician
- Lelio Orci (1937–2019), Italian scientist
- Luis Orcí (1878–1931), Mexican physician
- Roberto Orci (1973–2025), Mexican-American film and television screenwriter and producer

== See also ==
- Orsi
- Orczy (disambiguation)
- D'Orsi
