= Thomas Darcy =

Thomas Darcy may refer to:

- Thomas Darcy (judge) (died 1529), Irish cleric and judge
- Thomas Darcy, 1st Baron Darcy de Darcy (1467–1537), English statesman and rebel leader
- Thomas Darcy, 1st Baron Darcy of Chiche (1506–1558), English courtier during the reign of Edward VI
- Thomas Darcy, 1st Earl Rivers (c. 1565–1640), English peer and courtier
- Thomas F. Darcy (1932–2000), American political cartoonist
- Thomas F. Darcy Jr. (1895–1968), composer and leader of the US Army Band
- Tom Darcy (footballer) (1881–1955), South Melbourne footballer
- Tom Darcy (Australian politician) (1893–1979), politician in Australia

== See also ==
- Tom Darcey (1906–?), Australian Olympic rower
- Thomas D'Arcy (disambiguation), several people
