= Darcey (surname) =

Darcey is a surname. Notable people with the name include:

- Don Darcey (born 1934), Australian rules footballer
- Ellie Darcey-Alden (born 1999), English-American actress
- Janine Darcey (1917–1993), French film actress
- Pete Darcey (1930–2009), American basketball player
- Richard Darcey (1870–1944), Australian politician
- Tom Darcey (1906–1960), Australian rower

== See also ==
- Darcy (surname)
- D'Arcy (surname)
