= Thomas D'Arcy =

Thomas D'Arcy may refer to:

- Thomas D'Arcy (singer), Canadian singer and songwriter
- Thomas D'Arcy McGee (1825–1868), Irish-Canadian politician, Catholic spokesman, journalist, and poet
- Thomas McDonald D'Arcy (1932–1985), Scottish professional footballer

== See also ==
- Tom Darcey (1906–?), Australian Olympic rower
- Thomas Darcy, several people
