= Ernest Smith =

Canadian soldier of World War II, recipient of the Victoria Cross

Ernest Alvia "Smokey" Smith VC CM OBC CD
- Private "Smokey" Smith c.1945
- Born: 3 May 1914; New Westminster, British Columbia, Canada
- Died: 3 August 2005 (aged 91); Vancouver, British Columbia, Canada
- Military career
- Allegiance: Canada
- Branch: Canadian Army
- Service years: 1940–1945; 1950–1964
- Rank: Sergeant
- Nickname: Smokey
- Unit: The Seaforth Highlanders of Canada
- Conflicts: World War II: Italian Campaign
- Awards: Victoria Cross; Member of the Order of Canada; Member of the Order of British Columbia; Canadian Forces' Decoration

Ernest Alvia "Smokey" Smith VC CM OBC CD (3 May 1914 – 3 August 2005) was a Canadian recipient of the Victoria Cross, the highest award for gallantry in the face of the enemy that can be awarded to British and Commonwealth forces. He was the last living Canadian recipient of the Victoria Cross.

== Early life and career ==
Born in New Westminster, British Columbia, Smith came of age during the Great Depression and, along with many others, struggled to find steady employment.

He was 25 when he joined the Canadian Army on 5 March 1940, becoming part of The Seaforth Highlanders of Canada. In 1943, he first entered into combat. On 10 July 1943, he was part of the 1st Canadian Infantry Division landing in Sicily, remaining active throughout the Sicily and Italian campaign between July 1943 and February 1945. He participated in the fierce Battle of Ortona in December 1943.

On the night of 21/22 October 1944 at the River Savio, in northern Italy, Private Smith was in the spearhead of the attack which established a bridgehead over the river. With a hand-held PIAT anti-tank launcher he disabled a Mark V Panther tank at a range of just 30 feet (9.1 metres), and while protecting a wounded comrade, killed four panzergrenadiers and routed others. When another tank was sent to take out his position, he used another PIAT to damage it enough to cause it to retreat and wander in a strange direction. He then carried his wounded comrade and applied medical relief. He later personally counterattacked to disperse the Germans still attacking his previous position. He destroyed in total three Panther tanks, two self-propelled artillery pieces, a half-track, a scout car, and a large number of German soldiers.

Smith had been promoted to corporal nine times, but demoted back to private each time prior to his actions at the River Savio. He later achieved the rank of sergeant.

=== Citation ===
In Italy on the night of 21st–22nd October 1944, a Canadian Infantry Brigade was ordered to establish a bridgehead across the Savio River. The Seaforth Highlanders of Canada were selected as the spearhead of the attack, and in weather most unfavourable to the operation they crossed the river and captured their objective in spite of strong opposition from the enemy.

Torrential rain had caused the Savio River to rise six feet in five hours, and as the soft vertical banks made it impossible to bridge the river no tanks or anti-tank guns could be taken across the raging stream to the support of the rifle companies.

As the right forward company was consolidating its objective it was suddenly counter-attacked by a troop of three Mark V Panther tanks supported by two self-propelled guns and about thirty infantry and the situation appeared hopeless.

Under heavy fire from the approaching enemy tanks, Private Smith, showing great initiative and inspiring leadership, led his P.I.A.T. Group of two men across an open field to a position from which the P.I.A.T. could best be employed. Leaving one man on the weapon, Private Smith crossed the road with a Private James Tennant and obtained another P.I.A.T. Almost immediately an enemy tank came down the road firing its machine-guns along the line of the ditches. Private Smith's comrade, Private Tennant was wounded. At a range thirty feet and having to expose himself to the full view of the enemy, Private Smith fired the P.I.A.T. and hit the tank, putting it out of action. Ten German infantry immediately jumped off the back of the tank and charged him with Schmeissers and grenades. Without hesitation, Private Smith moved out on the road and with his Tommy gun at point-blank range, killed four Germans and drove the remainder back. Almost immediately another tank opened fire and more enemy infantry closed in on Smith's position. Obtaining some abandoned Tommy gun magazines from a ditch, he steadfastly held his position, protecting Private Tennant and fighting the enemy with his Tommy gun until they finally gave up and withdrew in disorder.

One tank and both self-propelled guns had been destroyed by this time, but yet another tank swept the area with fire from a longer range. Private Smith, still showing utter contempt for enemy fire, helped his wounded friend to cover and obtained medical aid for him behind a nearby building. He then returned to his position beside the road to await the possibility of a further enemy attack.

No further immediate attack developed, and as a result, the battalion was able to consolidate the bridgehead position so vital to the success of the whole operation, which led to the capture of San Giorgio Di Cesena and a further advance to the Ronco River.

Thus, by the dogged determination, outstanding devotion to duty and superb gallantry of this private soldier, his comrades were so inspired that the bridgehead was held firm against all enemy attacks, pending the arrival of tanks and anti-tank guns some hours later.

== Later military career ==
King George VI bestowed the VC on Smith personally at Buckingham Palace. Allegedly, Smith was placed in a jail cell in Rome the night before he was to be commended for his actions at Savio, in order to "keep him out of trouble"; for years, Smith would neither confirm nor deny that such a measure was enacted. However, in a 2003 interview with MacLeans Magazine's Ken MacQueen, Smith described the event: “I got locked up in Naples. They just wanted Smokey to be in the right spot. When I was first locked up, I was thinking, what the hell? But then they gave me a couple of beers and I was very happy.”

Smith was asked what was it like to meet the King: “It was kind of astounding. I go to Buckingham Palace and I say to the guard, 'What am I supposed to do?' He says, 'You do exactly as I do: take a bow from the hips.' I said, 'Oh Christ, you think I’m going to do that, you’re crazy.' I just saluted and that was it.

I was given the VC and told to put it in my pocket. I wasn't allowed to wear it for at least three days so the Canadian newspapers would have it the same time as the British ones. So for three days, I'm sitting in a bar in London drinking to beat hell. Someone came and said, 'Okay, Smokey, you can put on that medal now.' So I took it out and put it on my chest, and I never bought another drink that day.”

After receiving the VC, Smokey Smith was made a "poster boy" for the Canadian War Bonds drive.

Smith left the service after World War II, but returned in 1950 when he re-enlisted during the Korean War. Because of his iconic status, he was not put into combat. He retired from service again in 1964, having served for some time in Vancouver as a recruiting sergeant. As a result of his extended tenure, he received the Canadian Forces' Decoration for 12 years of service.

He was an honorary member of the Royal Military College of Canada, student # S132.

== Civilian life ==
In 1947, Smith wed Esther Weston, with whom he had two children, David and Norma-Jean. After his retirement from the military, Smith opened a travel agency with his wife, "Smith Travel", which was in operation from 1969 to 1992. During these years, Smith regularly visited sites related to World War II with clients. The couple retired in 1992, and Smith's wife died four years later, in 1996.

In his later years, as the number of living veterans began to grow thin, Smokey found himself the last living Canadian VC recipient in 2000. By this time Smith was retired and devoted much of his time to helping his fellow veterans, making frequent public appearances all over the world to assist in Remembrance Day ceremonies and greeting the Queen after her arrival during an official visit. He appeared in May 2000 in representation of the veterans of Canada at the consecration ceremony of Canada's Tomb of the Unknown Soldier, having aided in negotiations for the return of those remains. Smith was also on hand to unveil a Canadian postage stamp featuring both the British and Canadian versions of the Victoria Cross in 2004. The Canadian Pacific Railway dedicated a railcar in his honour on November 29, 2003.

Smith was appointed a Member of the Order of Canada on November 15, 1995, and received the honour in a ceremony on February 15, 1996. He became a Member of the Order of British Columbia in 2002. Gary Pawson nominated him for the Order of British Columbia starting in 1997, and each year following until he was finally so honoured. He was originally passed over for this honour until Clifford Chadderton, the British Columbia Ministry of Veterans Affairs, and several other organizations, wrote letters to the Lieutenant-Governor of British Columbia in his support.

== Death and funeral ==
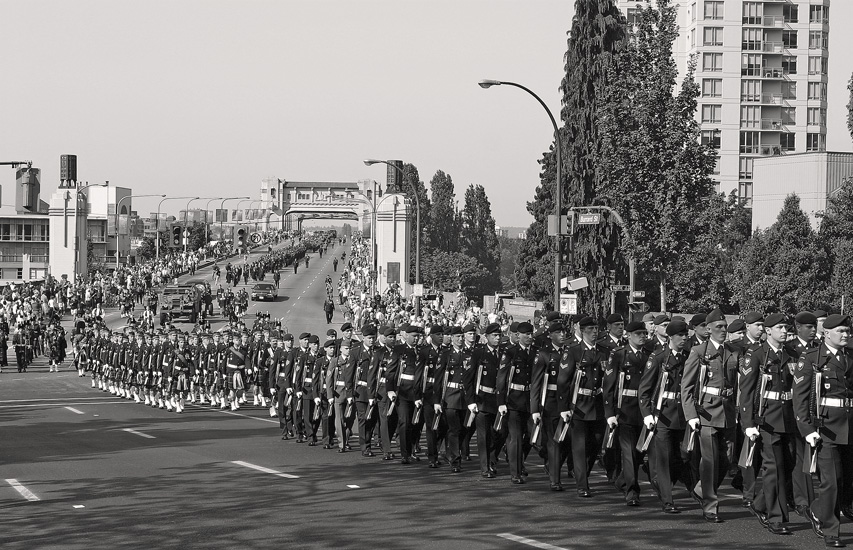
Military funeral procession for Smith in Vancouver on August 13, 2005

Smokey Smith died at his home in Vancouver on August 3, 2005, at the age of 91. His body was placed in the foyer of the House of Commons to lie in state on August 9, 2005, making him only the ninth person to be accorded this honour; government flags flew at half-mast on that day. He lay in repose at Vancouver's Seaforth Armoury on August 12, with a full military funeral in Vancouver on August 13. His ashes were scattered at sea in the Gulf of Georgia.

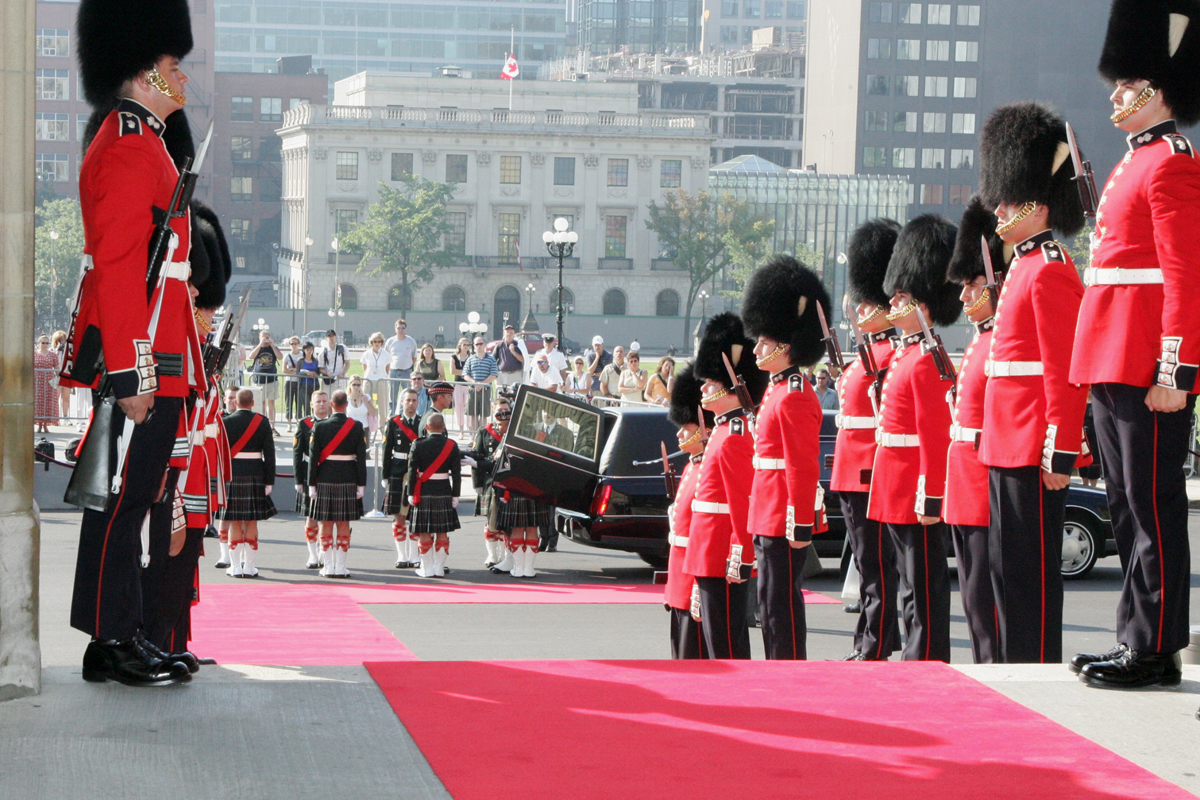
Smith lay in state on Parliament Hill in Ottawa on August 9, 2005

== Memorials ==
Smith donated his VC and medals to the Seaforth Highlanders of Canada in his will. The regiment has his Victoria Cross decoration and his full sized medals are [in 2011] in a safe deposit box. The Seaforth Highlanders of Canada Museum and Archives had a replica VC and set of medals and a generic World War II uniform on display. Three original uniforms from his Black Watch period were donated to three museums by his daughter in 2011, one each to the Black Watch Museum in Montreal, the Seaforth Highlanders of Canada Museum and Archives in Vancouver and the New Westminster Museum and Archives. His 1947 dated battledress blouse and one of his Glengarries are in a private collection.

The Ernest Smith Park was erected as a memorial by Ottawa, Ontario assisted by the Royal Canadian Legion Branch 638 (Kanata), and is dedicated to Private Ernest Alvia Smith, VC, CM, OBC, C.D.

A street in Saanich BC, Smokey Smith Place, is named in honor of Smith.

In the Robert Heinlein novel Starship Troopers, Camp Sergeant Spooky Smith (located in the Canadian Rockies, B.C.) may be a referral to Ernest Smith, although this is never explicitly stated.

== Honours and awards ==

Ribbon	Description	Notes
	Victoria Cross (VC)	VC Action took place on the night of 21–22 October 1944 at the Savio River in Northern Italy. Gazetted on 20 December 1944.
	Order of Canada (CM)	Member Announced on 15 November 1995. Invested on 15 February 1996.
	Order of British Columbia (OBC)	Member. 2002.
	1939-45 Star	
	Italy Star	
	Defence Medal	
	Canadian Volunteer Service Medal	With Overseas Clasp
	War Medal	
	Queen Elizabeth II Coronation Medal	1953
	Canadian Centennial Medal	1967
	Queen Elizabeth II Silver Jubilee Medal	1977. Both British and Canadian Versions.
	125th Anniversary of the Confederation of Canada Medal	1992.
	Queen Elizabeth II Golden Jubilee Medal	2002. Both British and Canadian Versions.
	Canadian Forces' Decoration (CD)	For 12 Years Service in the Canadian Forces.

- He received the Honorary degree of Doctor of Military Science from the Royal Military College of Canada on 18 January 2001.
