= Julian Jarrold =

English film and television director (born 1961)

- Born: 1961 (age 64–65); Norwich, Norfolk, England
- Education: Trinity & All Saints College, Leeds
- Occupations: Film director, producer
- Years active: 1983–present
- Parent: Peter Jarrold DL (1933–2019)

Julian Edward Peter Jarrold (born 1961) is a BAFTA-nominated British film and television director.

== Early life and family ==
Jarrold was born in Norwich, a scion of the Huguenot family Jerauld, originally from near Lyon in France, which founded Jarrolds of Norwich in 1823, he is the only son of Peter Jarrold DL and Juliet née Pollard.

He attended Gresham's School, Holt, before studying at Trinity & All Saints College, Leeds.

Jarrold is married and resides in London.

== Career ==
Jarrold directed Great Expectations, starring Ioan Gruffudd, in 1999. The Boston Globe felt that Jarrold helped distinguish it from the many other adaptations by "keeping the reins in on his characters, emotionally and morally. They are unromanticized and low-key performances that only rarely spill over into the maudlin and righteous." In 2006, Jarrold directed Kinky Boots which has proven hugely popular with audiences in its numerous showing on TV. The Chicago Tribune called the film "quite enjoyable, effortlessly well-done on every level, even moving at times, but relatively lightweight." In 2007, Becoming Jane was released. The Washington Times stated that Jarrold's direction "has made a witty, beautiful film. His technical achievement is no small matter, with nice, long tracking shots and clever focus tricks."

The following year, Jarrold directed the first film adaptation of Evelyn Waugh's iconic story Brideshead Revisited, "one of the great English novels which has never been filmed," according to producer Kevin Loader. It starred Hayley Atwell, Matthew Goode, Emma Thompson, and Michael Gambon. About the novel's status as an unchangeable classic, Jarrold stated that "there are people who are obsessive and obviously that's going to be daunting when they come and judge us. I've had a few people who have said, 'Why are you doing it?' But I think there is a generation who know nothing about Brideshead Revisited, who haven't read the book or who are only dimly aware of the TV series because it's been repeated on ITV4 or something." The Daily Telegraph felt that Jarrold's "scenes are filled with grand period detail – huge Rolls-Royces, ice sculptures, vast fireplaces of sculptured marble – but he stops it from becoming an overblown, glossy spectacle by making the world around the characters feel like a dream."

Jarrold directed the HBO film The Girl in 2013, receiving his first Emmy nomination for his work. Mandalay Vision hired Jarrold to direct the serial killer film Exit 147, with a script written by Travis Milloy. Producer Cathy Schulman and Matthew Rhodes produced the film for Mandalay. In February 2013, Taylor Kitsch joined the film to play lead as a sadistic sheriff. Then Jarrold directed A Royal Night Out for Ecosse Films, a movie released in May 2015.

His Emmy-nominated Red Riding 1974 was highly acclaimed with Andrew Garfield, Sean Bean, and Rebecca Hall giving great performances. Film Noir at its best according to the critics: the trilogy affords a fairly familiar immersion in contemporary British cinematic miserablism, where men and terror run wild, and beauty exists only in the cinematography and some of the performances. All else is horror. Certainly, that’s true in the trilogy, which, starting with Red Riding 1974, leaps into the void when a young Yorkshire journalist, "Eddie Dunford" (Andrew Garfield, not up to the leading-man task), realizes that the murder of a girl might be connected to a few earlier deaths, an insight that finds him first chasing after clues and then being chased in turn. Jarrold shot the film in Super 16 millimeter, which gives the images atmospheric grit and swirling grain that, with the almost comically ubiquitous cigarette smoke, nicely thickens the air (The New York Times).

In 2023 Jarrold's The Good Mothers won the best series at the Berlin International Festival.

Jarrold served as a judge at the Norwich Film Festival in 2016, being appointed its patron in 2017.

== Filmography as director ==
- Dramarama (1983) TV Series (episodes)
- Children's Ward, TV Series (1990–)
- Fighting for Gemma (1993)
- Cracker: The Big Crunch (1994) TV Episode
- Medics: All in the Mind (1994) TV Episode
- Medics: Changing Faces (1994) TV Episode
- Some Kind of Life (1995)
- Silent Witness (1996) TV Series (episodes)
- Touching Evil: Deadly Web TV Episode
- Touching Evil: Through the Clouds TV Episode
- Painted Lady (1997)
- All the King's Men (1999)
- Great Expectations (1999)
- Never Never (2000)
- White Teeth (2002)
- Crime and Punishment (2002) TV Film
- The Canterbury Tales: The Man of Law's Tale (2003)
- Anonymous Rex (2004)
- Kinky Boots (2005)
- Becoming Jane (2007)
- Brideshead Revisited (2008)
- Red Riding '1974' (2009)
- Worried About the Boy (2010) TV film
- Appropriate Adult (2011) TV series (2 episodes)
- The Girl (2012)
- The Great Train Robbery (2013)
- A Royal Night Out (2015)
- The Witness for the Prosecution (2016) TV series (2 episodes)
- The Crown (2016) TV series (2 episodes)
- Sulphur and White (2020)
- The Good Mothers (2023) TV series (6 episodes)
- A Very Royal Scandal (2024) TV series

Producer only

- The Other Side of Midnight (1988), TV mini-series presented by Tony Wilson

== See also ==
- British Academy of Film and Television Arts
- The Jarrold Group
