= D'arcy (name) =

D'arcy (or variant forms Darcy, Darci, Darcie, or Darcey), French for "From Arcy", is a surname from the village of Bois d'Arcy in Yvelines, near Paris. The surname is also applied as an Anglicization of the Gaelic surname Ó Dorchaidhe. Notable people with the name include:

== Surname ==
- D'Arcy (surname)

== Given name ==
- D'Arcy Baker (1877–1932), British businessman and racing driver
- D'Arcy Boulton (born 1946), Canadian heraldic artist and mediaeval historian
- D'Arcy Broderick, Canadian musician
- D'Arcy Carden (born 1980), American actress and comedian
- D'Arcy Corrigan (1870–1945), Irish actor and lawyer
- D'Arcy Osborne (1884–1964), British diplomat and 12th duke of Leeds
- D'Arcy McGee (1825–1868), Canadian politician
- D'Arcy Short (born 1990), Australian cricketer
- D'Arcy Wentworth Thompson (1860–1948), Scottish biologist, mathematician and classics scholar, son of the English scholar of the same name
- D'Arcy Wentworth Thompson (Galway) (1829–1902), English scholar
- D'arcy Wretzky (born 1968), American original bass player for the Smashing Pumpkins, often credited as simply D'arcy

== Fictional characters ==
- D'arcy Bloom, a fictional character on TV series Resident Alien

== See also ==
- Darcy (surname)
- Darcey (surname)
- D'Orsi
