= Darcy =

Darcy, Darci or Darcey may refer to different people such as:

== Science ==
- Darcy's law, which describes the flow of a fluid through porous material
- Darcy (unit), a unit of permeability of fluids in porous material
- Darcy friction factor in the field of fluid mechanics
- Darcy–Weisbach equation used in hydraulics for calculation of the head loss due to friction

== People ==
- Darcy (surname), a list of people with the surname

=== Men ===
- Darci Afonso Jacobi Júnior (born 1979), Brazilian footballer
- Darcy Blake (born 1988), Welsh footballer
- Darcy Byrne, Australian local politician
- Darcy Dallas (born 1972), Canadian ice hockey defenceman
- Darcy Cameron (born 1995), Australian rules footballer
- Darcy Daniher (born 1989), Australian rules footballer
- Darci Frigo, Brazilian activist
- Darcy Furber, Canadian politician
- Darcy Gardiner (born 1995), Australian rules footballer
- Darcy Hordichuk (born 1980), professional ice hockey player
- Darcy Kuemper (born 1990), professional ice hockey player
- Darcy Lang (born 1995), Australian rules footballer
- Darcy Lear (1898–1967), Australian rules footballer
- Darcy Lussick (born 1989), Australian rugby league player
- Darcy McDougall (1886–1952), Australian rules footballer
- Darci Menezes (born 1949), Brazilian footballer
- Darcy Moore (born 1996), Australian rules footballer
- Darci Luiz Simon (born 1966), Brazilian footballer
- Darci Miguel Monteiro (1968-2018), Brazilian footballer
- Darcy Requi Florêncio (1955–2024), Brazilian footballer
- Darcy Ribeiro, (1922–1997), Brazilian anthropologist and politician
- Darcy Tucker (born 1975), professional ice hockey player
- Darcy Grey (born 1991), British actor

=== Women ===
- D'Arcy Carden (born 1980), American actress
- D'arcy Wretzky (born 1968), American bassist and former member of Smashing Pumpkins
- Darcey Bussell (born 1969), English ballerina
- Darcy Castro, American politician
- Darci Lynne (born 2004), American singing ventriloquist
- Darci Kistler (born 1964), American ballet dancer
- Darcy LaPier (born 1965), American actress
- Darcy Rose Byrnes (born 1998), American and Irish actress, singer and songwriter
- Darcy Sterling (born 1969), American actress

== Fictional characters ==
- Lord Darcy (character), a detective created by Randall Garrett
- Diane Darcy, racing car driver, in Herbie Goes to Monte Carlo
- Darcy Edwards, student on Degrassi: The Next Generation
- Darcy (Winx Club), a witch from animated series Winx Club
- Darcy Doll, an android companion created by the Toyman in Superman: The Animated Series
- Darcy Hudson, a character in the Australian drama series A Country Practice
- Darcy Lewis, a character in the Marvel Cinematic Universe portrayed by Kat Dennings
- Darcy Wilde from the British soap opera Hollyoaks
- Darcy Wu, the nickname used by The Core when possessing Marcy Wu in the television series Amphibia
- Darcy, a tunnel-boring driller in the British educational TV show Thomas & Friends and its reboot, Thomas & Friends: All Engines Go!
- Darcy, in Richie Rich, played by Jenna Ortega
- Darcy, a shopkeeper in Fields of Mistria

== Other uses ==
- Darcy v. Allein, the first court case to result in a judgement against monopoly
- Darci, a doll in the Groovy Girls line

== See also ==
- D'arcy (disambiguation)
- Darcie, a feminine given name
- Baron Darcy (disambiguation)
