= John Darcy =

John Darcy may refer to:

- John Darcy, 1st Baron Darcy de Knayth (c. 1290–1347), English peer
- John Darcy, Lord Conyers (1659–1689), English soldier

== See also ==
- John D'Arcy, several people
