= 231st Battalion (Seaforth Highlanders of Canada), CEF =

231st Battalion, CEF
- Active: 1916–1917
- Country: Canada
- Branch: Canadian Expeditionary Force
- Type: Infantry
- Mobilization headquarters: Vancouver, British Columbia, Canada
- Motto(s): Scottish Gaelic: Cuidich'n righ, lit. ''Help the King''
- Battle honours: The Great War, 1917

Commanders
- Officer commanding: Lieut-Col. Francis Easton Leach

The 231st Battalion, CEF was a unit in the Canadian Expeditionary Force during the First World War. Based in Vancouver, British Columbia, the unit began recruiting in early 1916 in that city and the surrounding district. After sailing to England in April 1917, the battalion was absorbed into the 24th Reserve Battalion on April 22, 1917. The 231st Battalion, CEF had one officer commanding: Lieutenant-Colonel Francis Easton Leach. The battalion is perpetuated by the Seaforth Highlanders of Canada.

In 1929, the battalion was awarded the theatre of war honour "The Great War, 1917".

== See also ==
- Seaforth Armoury
