= D'arcy =

D'Arcy or D'arcy may refer to:

== People ==
- D'arcy (name), including a list of people with the surname or given name
- D'Arcy, one of the Tribes of Galway, 14 prominent families in the city of Galway, Ireland, in the 13th and 14th centuries

== Places ==
- D'Arcy, British Columbia, an unincorporated community in Canada
- D'Arcy, Saskatchewan, a village in Canada
- D'Arcy, Midlothian, a hamlet Midlothian, Scotland

== See also ==
- Darcy (disambiguation)
