= Darcie =

Darcie is a feminine given name. Notable people with the name include:

- Darcie Dohnal (born 1972), American short track speed skater
- Darcie Lappan (born 2001), Canadian ice hockey player
- Darcie Vincent (born 1970), women's basketball coach

== See also ==
- Darcy (disambiguation)
