= Ryan D'Arcy =

Canadian neuroscientist, innovator and entrepreneur

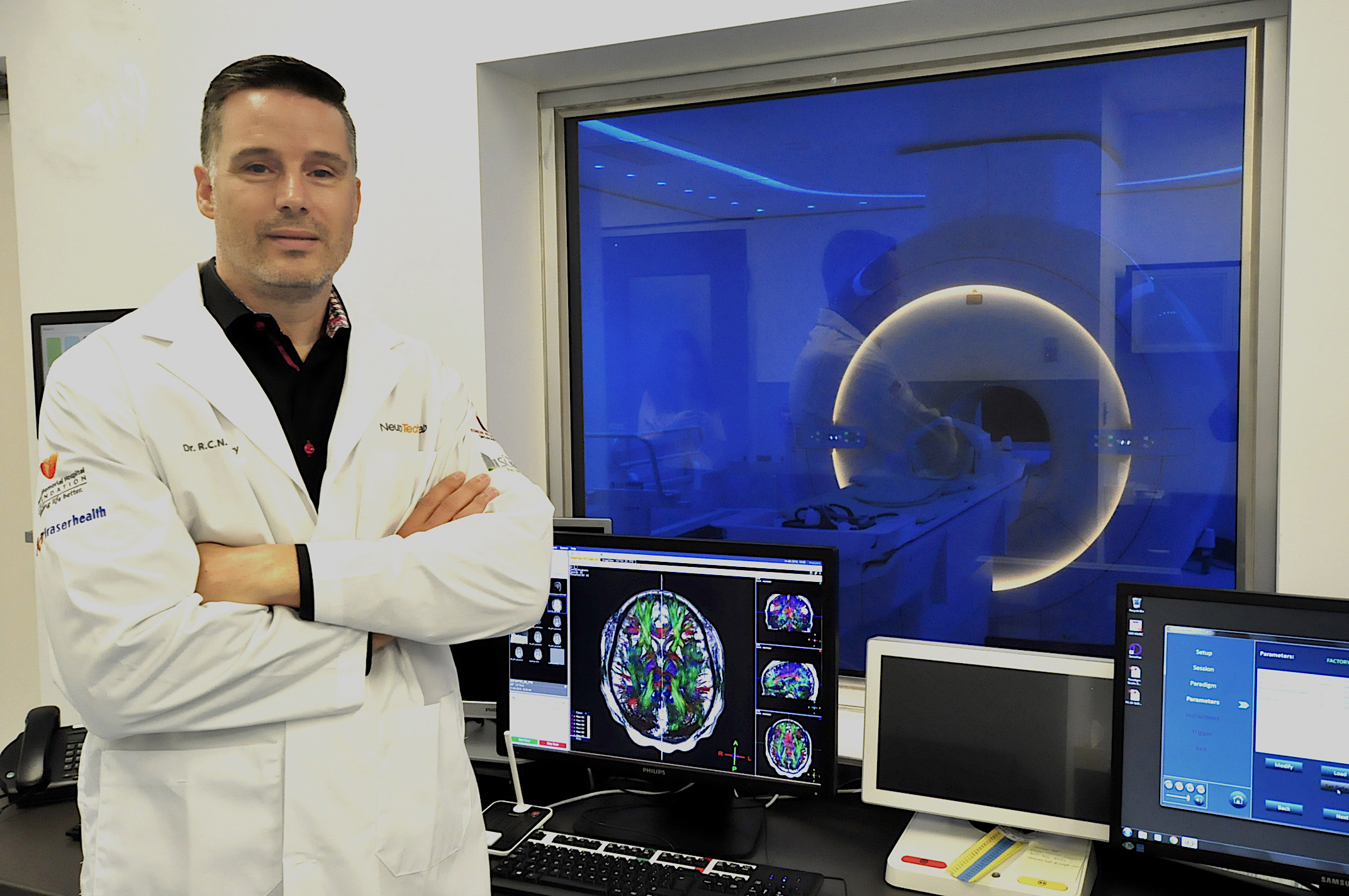
- Dr. Ryan D'Arcy
- Born: 1972 (age 53–54); Williams Lake, British Columbia
- Citizenship: Canadian
- Education: University of Victoria; Dalhousie University
- Known for: Co-Founder, HealthTech Connex Inc. Co-Founder, Health & Technology District; Founder, BrainNET; Developed Brain Vital Signs Framework; Co-Founder, Innovation Boulevard; Founder, NRC Institute for Biodiagnostics (Atlantic), now BIOTIC Head of Health Sciences and Innovation, Surrey Memorial Hospital; Surrey Memorial Hospital Foundation BC Leadership Chair in Multimodal Technology for Healthcare Innovations and Professor, Simon Fraser University; ImageTech Lab NeuroTech Lab
- Scientific career
- Fields: neuroscientist, neuroscience, brain imaging, brain research, innovator, entrepreneur, researcher
- Workplaces: Surrey Memorial Hospital; Simon Fraser University; National Research Council of Canada; HealthTech Connex Inc.

Ryan C.N. D'Arcy (born 1972) is a Canadian neuroscientist, researcher, innovator and entrepreneur. D'Arcy co-founded HealthTech Connex Inc. where he serves as President and Chief Scientific Officer. HealthTech Connex translates neuroscience advancements into health technology breakthroughs. D'Arcy is most known for coining the term "brain vital signs" and for leading the research and development of the brain vital signs framework.

He is also a full tenured professor with appointments at both Simon Fraser University and the University of British Columbia. He holds the Surrey Memorial Hospital Foundation BC Leadership Chair in Multimodal Technology for Healthcare Innovations. D'Arcy has published more than 300 academic works, generated more than $100 million in competitive research and innovation investment, and has been recognized through numerous national and international awards and distinctions.

Throughout his career, D'Arcy has worked to advance brain innovations. He has advocated for the brain to be monitored regularly to track one's health, and has been focused on optimizing brain health through objective measurements to find the best treatments. His work has involved developing accessible technology improvements for evaluation and treatment in brain injury and concussion, along with other brain conditions such as dementia, epilepsy, brain tumours and stroke.

D'Arcy has played roles in advancing Canada's biotechnology industry through founding and co-founding a number of large-scale health-technology initiatives over the course of his career while at the National Research Council Canada (NRC) and Simon Fraser University/Surrey Memorial Hospital. These initiatives include NRC's Institute of Biodiagnostics (Atlantic), now called BIOTIC, and BC's Health and Technology District, encompassing Surrey Memorial Hospital's Health Sciences and Innovation initiative, Innovation Boulevard, the NeuroTech and ImageTech Laboratories, the HealthTech Innovation Hub and the BrainNET initiative. The Health and Technology District continues to grow towards the planned goals of over 1.5 million square feet of health/technology/innovation space, employing more than 15,000 tech and tech related jobs, and generating more than $1.1 billion into the economy annually.

== Early life and education ==
Born and raised in Williams Lake, British Columbia, Ryan D'Arcy attended Brentwood College School, on Vancouver Island, graduating in 1990. He earned a B.Sc. (with distinction) from the University of Victoria in 1996, an M.Sc. in neuropsychology in 1998 and a Ph.D. in neuroscience in 2002 from Dalhousie University. D'Arcy was a Killam Scholar while at Dalhousie University. In 2001, he moved to NRC’s Institute for Biodiagnostics for a Research Associate/Postdoctoral Fellowship in Magnetic Resonance Imaging Physics. He is a member of the Professional Engineers and Geoscientists of British Columbia, as an engineering licensee (PlEng) with a specialization in neuroimaging and neurotechnology.

=== Brain Vital Signs ===
Foundational research that led to the concept of brain vital signs started in 1995, with Dr. D’Arcy leading the development of the first rapid, easy, point-of-care measurement of brain waves in 2011. The objective was to utilize electroencephalography (EEG) data, and particularly cognitive evoked potentials (EPs), also known as event-related potentials (ERPs), as an objective physiological measure of brain function. ERPs were well established but had not been translated into a clinically accessible framework in a manner similar to the measurement of a body's vital signs like blood pressure. D’Arcy’s team developed a new brain vital sign framework specific to the evaluation and monitoring of brain function. The brain vital signs framework, which derived from the earlier Halifax Consciousness Scanner work, objectively analyze complex EEG data, which then provides simple and objective physiological markers of brain function.

The research team subsequently published a series of studies on the development of brain vital signs. These included the Frontiers in Neuroscience Journal, which remains the most highly accessed paper in the journal's history and ranked in the top 5% of research outputs scored by Altmetrics, and findings from a multi-year hockey concussion study conducted in collaboration with the Mayo Clinic Sports Medicine Center in Brain: A Journal of Neurology. The latter study was the first to demonstrate that brain vital sign monitoring is more sensitive in detecting impairments than existing clinical tests for concussions.

=== HealthTech Connex Inc. ===
In 2013, D’Arcy and Kirk Fisher co-founded HealthTech Connex Inc. Derived from the brain vital sign science, HealthTech Connex conceived the NeuroCatch Platform to convert electroencephalography recordings (EEG) of the N100 (Auditory sensation), P300 (Basic attention), and N400 (Cognitive processing) into a rapid, portable, non-invasive evaluation platform for point-of-care deployment.

=== Health and Technology District ===
D'Arcy also co-founded the Health and Technology District with Lark Group, a Canadian family-owned and operated development, construction and facility management company based in Surrey, British Columbia.

The Lark Group developed the Health and Technology District in anticipation of the rapidly growing health and technology sector in British Columbia. The District currently consists of three buildings, City Centre 1, 2, and 3, with the largest City Centre 4 breaking ground in 2022 and is slated to be completed in 2025.

In 2019, D'Arcy spearheaded the formation of BrainNET within the Health and Technology District, a clinical-academic-innovation network dedicated to bringing advances in neuro-technologies to individual improvements in brain health through a consortium of initiatives and technologies.

=== Translating Research into Real-life Impacts ===
D’Arcy has been credited in helping translate neuroscience advances into real-life impacts.

In the early 1990s, using functional MRI to detect white matter was considered controversial, despite it being traditionally used for gray brain matter. Dr. D’Arcy and a team of researchers set out to investigate white matter fMRI activation, and published a number of studies with evidence to support using fMRI for white matter activation. These studies opened up fundamental avenues to explore functional connectivity in distributed neural networks, which has since been used to advance understanding of white matter dysfunction in neurological diseases such as multiple sclerosis and Alzheimer’s disease.

Since 1995, D’Arcy and his research team have led the development of using event-related potentials (ERPs) for clinical evaluations of brain function. In 2010, they developed the Halifax Consciousness Scanner (HCS), a portable ERP device that quickly determines neurological function in cases of severe brain trauma. The HCS technology was widely recognized with several innovation awards, including the 2015 Winner of Wall Street Journal’s Global Technology Start-up Showcase. While developed for functional status evaluation, the HCS prototype ultimately led to the discovery of the brain vital signs framework, which has since led the development the NeuroCatch Platform through HealthTech Connex. The NeuroCatch Platform received its first regulator approval as a Class II Medical Device from Health Canada in early 2019.

In 2008, together with neuroscientist and neurosurgeon Dr. David B. Clarke, D'Arcy was part of the research team at the National Research Council at Dalhousie University in developing the world's first virtual reality based neurosurgical simulation and rehearsal tool NeuroTouch, which was subsequently licensed to CAE Inc. as NeuroVR. Subsequently, D'Arcy and Clarke teamed up again, this time with Conquer Mobile to develop PeriopSim, a suite of portable surgical simulation training tools used to train perioperative nurses.

D’Arcy was involved with Simon Fraser University's rapid growth in medical technology research, one component of which is the launch of the ImageTech Lab. The SFU ImageTechLab is a first-of-its-kind research facility in Western Canada, combining state-of-the-art imaging devices to advance brain/body research, and focus on advanced diagnostics and treatment in neurology, mental health and other healthcare areas. The ImageTech Lab completed the large-scale initiative announced April 2013 by then City of Surrey Mayor Dianne Watts to create the Mayor's Health Technology Working Group with D’Arcy as co-chair. It composed of leaders from the health, education, and development communities to shape a new health-tech region located between Simon Fraser University Surrey and Surrey Memorial Hospital called Innovation Boulevard.

=== Project Iron Soldier ===
Since 2009, D’Arcy has been helping rehabilitate Trevor Greene, a Canadian war veteran and brain injury survivor who was attacked while on tour in Afghanistan with an axe to the head. D'Arcy, together with Trevor and his wife Debbie Greene, have used different modalities to support recovery through the use of brain imaging, assistive device, and neuromodulation technologies paired with intensive rehabilitation. The project (called “Iron Soldier”) has since progressed towards Trevor's goal to climb to the Mount Everest base camp, and catalyzed the Legion Veteran's Village initiative to revitalize Legions across the country into centres for excellence in rehabilitation and post-traumatic stress disorder.

D’Arcy and his research team at HealthTech Connex Inc. and the Surrey Neuroplasticity Clinic in Surrey, B.C., continued to help Greene with intensive daily rehabilitation, but the team experienced an extended plateau in progress using conventional therapy alone. To break through the plateau, the research team launched an intensive 14-week study using the Portable Neuromodulation Stimulator (or PoNS™), in combination with physical therapy to safely stimulate novel neuroplasticity and tracked brain vital sign improvements using the NeuroCatch® Platform (or NeuroCatch®). The peer-reviewed study on Capt. Greene’s physical, cognitive and PTSD improvements was published in September 2020 in the Frontiers of Human Neuroscience, demonstrating that the PoNS neurostimulation, paired with intensive rehabilitation, may stimulate neuroplasticity to overcome an extended recovery plateau in this case as objectively measured by NeuroCatch and other brain scanning technologies.

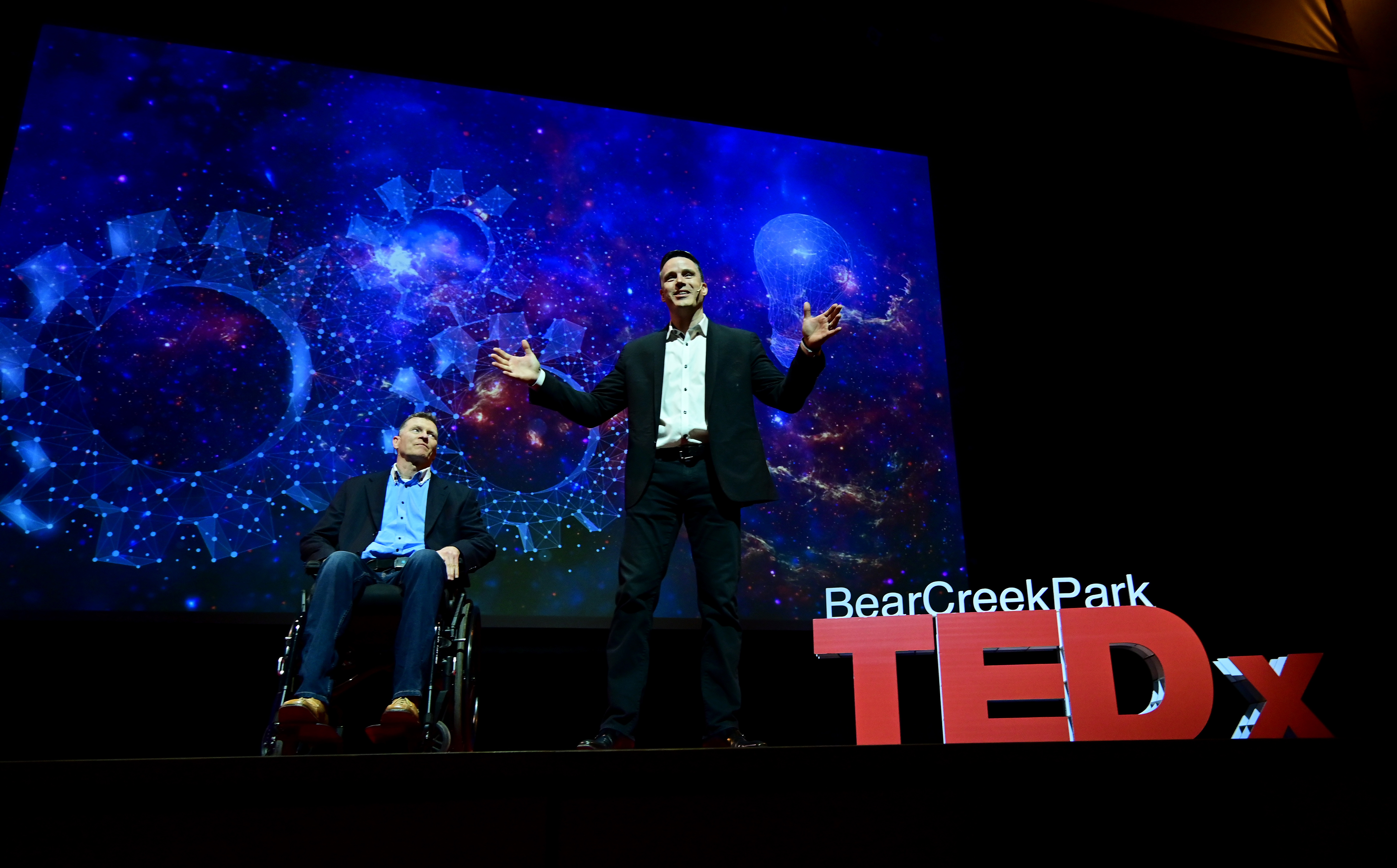
Dr. Ryan D'Arcy and Iron Soldier Trevor Greene speak at TedXBearCreekPark

As a thought leader, university professor and international speaker, Dr. D’Arcy speaks frequently to large audiences and has done so extensively over the course of his career. He has focused on communicating technology and scientific advances outside of academic and technical scientific forums. He is a 3-times TEDx speaker including Surrey’s TEDxBearCreekPark, TEDxSFU and TEDxBrentwoodCollegeSchool, and has frequently represented Canada in health technology innovation events throughout the world, including leading brain technology missions around the world for over a decade.

== Awards ==
D'Arcy has been named one of Business in Vancouver's 2021, 2022, and 2023 BC500 leaders, recognizing the 500 most influential business leaders in British Columbia.

In 2021, D'Arcy was named Business Person of the Year at the 2021 Surrey Board of Trade, Surrey Business Excellence Award.

D'Arcy has been awarded a Public Service Award of Excellence, The National Research Council's Research Breakthrough of the Year, and the Discovery Award for Innovation.

D’Arcy's team was awarded the International Global Best Award in STEM in 2016 (Science, Technology, Engineering, and Mathematics).

D'Arcy's HealthTech Connex Inc. team won a 2018 Surrey Business Excellence Award from the Surrey Board of Trade.

== Selected publications ==
D'Arcy's published works include:

- Fickling, Shaun D.; Greene, Trevor; Greene, Debbie; Frehlick, Zack; Campbell, Natasha; Etheridge, Tori; Smith, Christopher J.; Bollinger, Fabio; Danilov, Yuri; Rizzotti, Rowena; Livingstone, Ashley C. (2020). "Brain Vital Signs Detect Cognitive Improvements During Combined Physical Therapy and Neuromodulation in Rehabilitation From Severe Traumatic Brain Injury: A Case Report". Frontiers in Human Neuroscience. 14. doi:10.3389/fnhum.2020.00347 ISSN 1662-5161.
- Shaun D Fickling, Aynsley M Smith, Gabriela Pawlowski, Sujoy Ghosh Hajra, Careesa C Liu, Kyle Farrell, Janelle Jorgensen, Xiaowei Song, Michael J Stuart, Ryan C N D’Arcy, "Brain vital signs detect concussion-related neurophysiological impairments in ice hockey." Brain, Volume 142, Issue 2, February 2019, Pages 255–262, https://doi.org/10.1093/brain/awy317
- Ghosh Hajra, Sujoy; Liu, Caressa C.; Song, Xiaowei; Fickling, Shaun; Liu, Luke E.; Pawlowski, Gabriela; Jorgensen, Janelle K.; Smith, Aynsley M.; Schnaider-Beeri, Michal; Van Den Broek, Rudi; Rizzotti, Rowena; Fisher, Kirk; D'Arcy, Ryan C. N. (2016-06-12). "Developing Brain Vital Signs: Initial Framework for Monitoring Brain Function Changes Over Time". Frontiers in Neuroscience. 10 (211): 211. doi:10.3389/fnins.2016.00211. PMC 4867677. PMID 27242415.
- D'Arcy, Ryan C. N. PhD; Lindsay, D. Stephen PhD; Song, Xiaowei PhD; Gawryluk, Jodie R. PhD; Greene. (September/October 2016) "Long-Term Motor Recovery After Severe Traumatic Brain Injury: Beyond Established Limits Journal of Head Trauma Rehabilitation" The Journal of Head Trauma Rehabilitation. Volume 31 - Issue 5 - p E50-E58. doi:10.1097/HTR.0000000000000185
- McWhinney, Sean R.; Bardouille, Timothy; D’Arcy, Ryan C. N.; Newman, Aaron J. (2015-10-22). "Asymmetric Weighting to Optimize Regional Sensitivity in Combined fMRI-MEG Maps". Brain Topography. 29 (1): 1–12. doi:10.1007/s10548-015-0457-z. ISSN 0896-0267. PMID 26492915. S2CID 1899685.
- Sculthorpe-Petley, Lauren; Liu, Careesa; Ghosh Hajra, Sujoy; Parvar, Hossein; Satel, Jason; Trappenberg, Thomas P.; Boshra, Rober; D’Arcy, Ryan C. N. (2015-04-30). "A rapid event-related potential (ERP) method for point-of-care evaluation of brain function: Development of the Halifax Consciousness Scanner". Journal of Neuroscience Methods. 245: 64–72. doi:10.1016/j.jneumeth.2015.02.008. PMID 25701685. S2CID 31188183.
- Gawryluk, Jodie R.; Mazerolle, Erin L.; Beyea, Steven D.; D'Arcy, Ryan C. N. (2014-08-04). "Functional MRI activation in white matter during the Symbol Digit Modalities Test". Frontiers in Human Neuroscience. 8: 589. doi:10.3389/fnhum.2014.00589. ISSN 1662-5161. PMC 4120763. PMID 25136311.
- Gawryluk JR, Mazerolle EL and D'Arcy RCN (August 8, 2014) "Does functional MRI detect activation in white matter? A review of emerging evidence, issues, and future directions." Frontiers Neuroscience. 8:239. doi:10.3389/fnins.2014.00239
- Ryan C.N. D'Arcy, Timothy Bardouille, Aaron J. Newman, Sean R. McWhinney, Drew DeBay, R. Mark Sadler, David B. Clarke, Michael J. Esser. (March 15, 2012). "Spatial MEG Laterality maps for language: Clinical applications in epilepsy." Human Brain Mapping. Vol. 34:8. doi: https://doi.org/10.1002/hbm.22024
- C. N. D’Arcy, S. G. Hajra, C. Liu, L. D. Sculthorpe and D. F. Weaver, "Towards Brain First-Aid: A Diagnostic Device for Conscious Awareness," in IEEE Transactions on Biomedical Engineering, vol. 58, no. 3, pp. 750–754, March 2011. doi:10.1109/TBME.2010.2090880
- Mazerolle, Erin L.; Beyea, Steven D.; Gawryluk, Jodie R.; Brewer, Kimberly D.; Bowen, Chris V.; D'Arcy, Ryan C. N. (2010-04-01). "Confirming white matter fMRI activation in the corpus callosum: Co-localization with DTI tractography". NeuroImage. 50 (2): 616–621. doi:10.1016/j.neuroimage.2009.12.102. PMID 20053383. S2CID 207174241.
