= Orsy =

Orsy may refer to:

- Ladislas Orsy (1921–2025), Hungarian theologian
- Jaim Orsy, character in the Foundation series
- Orsy, Warmian-Masurian Voivodeship, Poland

== See also ==
- Orsi
