= Seaforth Highlanders of Canada =

Reserve infantry regiment of the Canadian Army

The Seaforth Highlanders of Canada
- Regimental badge
- Active: 1910–present
- Country: Canada
- Branch: Canadian Army
- Type: Light infantry
- Part of: 39 Canadian Brigade Group
- Garrison/HQ: Seaforth Armoury, Vancouver, British Columbia
- Motto: Cuidich'n righ (Scottish Gaelic for 'Aid the king')
- March: "The Piobaireachd of Donald Dhu"
- Engagements: First World War; Second World War; War in Afghanistan
- Battle honours: See #Battle honours
- Website: seaforthhighlanders.ca

Commanders
- Colonel-in-chief: Vacant

Insignia
- Tartan: Seaforth MacKenzie
- Abbreviation: Seaforth of C

The Seaforth Highlanders of Canada is a Primary Reserve infantry regiment of the Canadian Army based in Vancouver, British Columbia. The regiment is subordinate to 39 Canadian Brigade Group, 3rd Canadian Division. Based at the Seaforth Armoury on Burrard Street in Vancouver, the regiment serves in both times of war and civil emergency, such as disaster relief after earthquakes or floods. It also contributes individual volunteers or "augmentees" to Canadian Forces operations around the world.

The regiment was formed in 1910 and served overseas in both World War I and World War II. Members of the Seaforth Highlanders have deployed on many missions since World War II including Korea, Egypt, Cyprus, Croatia and most recently in Afghanistan.

== Lineage ==
The regimental colour of The Seaforth Highlanders of Canada.

The camp flag of The Seaforth Highlanders of Canada.

=== The Seaforth Highlanders of Canada ===
- Originated 24 November 1910 in Vancouver, British Columbia as the 72nd Highlanders of Canada
- Redesignated 15 April 1912 as the 72nd Seaforth Highlanders of Canada
- Redesignated 16 December 1912 as the 72nd Regiment "Seaforth Highlanders of Canada"
- Redesignated 12 March 1920 as The Seaforth Highlanders of Canada
- Redesignated 7 November 1940 as the 2nd Battalion, The Seaforth Highlanders of Canada
- Redesignated 1 November 1945 as The Seaforth Highlanders of Canada

=== Lineage chart ===
Lineage chart

1910	72nd Highlanders of Canada
1912	72nd Seaforth Highlanders of Canada
1912	72nd Regt "Seaforth Highlanders of Canada"
1914	72nd "Overseas" Bn, CEF
1916	231st "Overseas" Bn, CEF
1917	Absorbed by 24th Reserve Bn
1920	Disbanded	1st Bn (72nd Bn, CEF), The Seaforth Highlanders of Canada	2nd Bn (231st Bn, CEF), (Note: Reserve) The Seaforth Highlanders of Canada
1936	The Seaforth Highlanders of Canada	Disbanded
1939	The Seaforth Highlanders of Canada, CASF
1940	1st Bn, The Seaforth Highlanders of Canada, CASF	2nd Bn, The Seaforth Highlanders of Canada
1945	2nd Canadian Infy Bn (The Seaforth Highlanders of Canada), CASF
1945	Disbanded	Disbanded	The Seaforth Highlanders of Canada
1951	"E" Coy, (Note: Regular Force) The Seaforth Highlanders of Canada	"F" Coy, The Seaforth Highlanders of Canada
1951	Absorbed by 1st Canadian Highland Bn
1952	Absorbed by 2nd Canadian Highland Bn

== Perpetuations ==
=== The Great War ===
- 72nd Battalion (Seaforth Highlanders of Canada), CEF
- 231st Battalion (Seaforth Highlanders of Canada), CEF

== Operational history ==
=== The Great War ===
The 72nd Battalion (Seaforth Highlanders of Canada), CEF was authorized on 10 July 1915 and embarked for Britain on 23 April 1916. It disembarked in France on 13 August 1916, where it fought as part of the 12th Infantry Brigade, 4th Canadian Division in France and Flanders until the end of the war. The battalion disbanded on 30 August 1920.

The 231st Battalion (Seaforth Highlanders of Canada), CEF was authorized on 15 July 1916 and embarked for Britain on 11 April 1917, where, on 22 April 1917, its personnel were absorbed by the 24th Reserve Battalion, CEF to provide reinforcements for the Canadian Corps in the field. The battalion disbanded on 11 April 1918.

=== The Second World War ===
The regiment mobilized The Seaforth Highlanders of Canada, CASF for active service on 1 September 1939. It was redesignated as the 1st Battalion, The Seaforth Highlanders of Canada, CASF on 7 November 1940. It embarked for Britain on 20 December 1939. The battalion landed in Sicily on 10 July 1943 and in Italy on 4 September 1943 as part of the 2nd Brigade, 1st Canadian Infantry Division. On 14 March 1945, it moved with the I Canadian Corps to North-West Europe as part of Operation Goldflake, where it fought until the end of the war. The overseas battalion disbanded on 31 October 1945.

On 1 June 1945, a second Active Force component of the regiment was mobilized for service in the Pacific theatre of operations designated as the 2nd Canadian Infantry Battalion (The Seaforth Highlanders of Canada), CASF. The battalion disbanded on 1 November 1945.

=== Post-War:Korea and NATO ===
On 4 May 1951, the regiment mobilized two temporary Active Force companies designated "E" and "F" Company. "E" Company was reduced to nil strength when its personnel were incorporated into the 1st Canadian Highland Battalion (later the 1st Battalion, The Black Watch (Royal Highland Regiment) of Canada) for service in Germany with the North Atlantic Treaty Organization. It disbanded on 29 July 1953. "F" Company was initially used as a reinforcement pool for "E" Company. On 15 May 1952, it was reduced to nil strength when its personnel were absorbed by the newly formed 2nd Canadian Highland Battalion (later the 2nd Battalion, The Black Watch (Royal Highland Regiment) of Canada) for service in Korea with the United Nations. "F" Company disbanded on 29 July 1953.

=== Afghanistan ===
The regiment contributed an aggregate of more than 20% of its authorized strength to the various Task Forces which served in Afghanistan between 2002 and 2014.

== Alliances ==
- United Kingdom — The Highlanders

== Battle honours ==
The regimental colour includes the letter F with a coronet of a baron, commemorating Francis Mackenzie, 1st Baron Seaforth

In the list below, battle honours in small capitals are for participation in large operations and campaigns, while those in lowercase indicate honours granted for more specific battles. Those battle honours in bold type are emblazoned on the regimental colour.

First World War
- **Ypres, 1915, '17**
- **Festubert, 1915**
- **Somme, 1916**
- Ancre Heights
- Ancre, 1916
- Arras, 1917, '18
- **Vimy, 1917**
- **Passchendaele**
- **Amiens**
- Scarpe, 1918
- **Drocourt–Quéant**
- Hindenburg Line
- **Canal du Nord**
- **Valenciennes**
- Sambre
- **France and Flanders, 1915–18**
Second World War
- Landing in Sicily
- **Agira**
- Adrano
- Troina Valley
- **Sicily, 1943**
- **Monte San Marco**
- Baranello
- The Moro
- San Leonardo
- The Gully
- **Ortona**
- Liri Valley
- **Hitler Line**
- **Gothic Line**
- Pozzo Alto Ridge
- Rimini Line
- San Martino–San Lorenzo
- San Fortunato
- **Savio Bridgehead**
- Naviglio Canal
- Fosso Munio
- Granarolo
- **Italy, 1943–1945**
- **Apeldoorn**
- **North-West Europe, 1945**
South-West Asia
Afghanistan

== History ==
=== Foundations ===
In 1909, members of Vancouver's Scottish community sought to raise a highland regiment in Vancouver. The question was first put to the Gaelic societies and the idea was received favourably. A meeting was held on 11 May 1909, in the St. Andrews and Caledonian Societies rooms to discuss the issue.

The topic continued to be discussed in the Scottish circles of the city. The delegates met again on 17 January 1910, and it was reported that an application had been sent to the Minister of Militia to raise a highland regiment in Vancouver. It had been decided to apply for the number 72, that of the Seaforth Highlanders in Scotland, and that number being vacant on the Canadian Militia List.

On 24 November 1910, authorization was received from the Militia Department for the formation of a new regiment in Vancouver bearing the number 72, and wearing the same uniform and tartan as the Seaforth Highlanders of the Imperial service. In a letter dated April 11, 1911, consent to use the name Seaforth Highlanders of Canada was received from the 1st and 2nd Battalions of the Imperial Seaforth Highlanders.

On 22 June 1911, the years of hard work culminated in the first parade of the regiment on the parade ground in downtown Vancouver, at Larwill Park, later the bus depot of Pacific Coast Stage Lines and now a parking lot, between the Queen Elizabeth Theatre and the Beatty Street Drill Hall.

The Seaforths first saw active service the next year in the summer of 1912 when rallies by striking coal miners in the area around Nanaimo led to rioting. The miners were striking because of workplace safety concerns, such as lethal gas explosions that had already killed hundreds. A company from the Seaforths was sent to garrison the area and maintain the peace. Though not a shot was ever fired, peace was restored and maintained until the unit was called back to mobilize for war in August 1914.

=== The Great War ===
Upon hearing of the proclamation of war with Germany on 4 August 1914 Lieutenant Colonel Edwards-Leckie, commanding officer of the Seaforth Highlanders, immediately offered the regiment for overseas service. His request was denied, and instead the regiment provided 25 officers and 514 men for the 16th Battalion Canadian Expeditionary Force, forming almost half the battalion. While awaiting permission for the Seaforths to go overseas the regiment recruited and deployed an additional 41 officers and 1,637 men to numerous battalions.

Finally on 18 July Major J.A. Clark was appointed as the commander of the 72nd Battalion (Seaforth Highlanders of Canada), CEF and ordered to begin training for overseas service. The regiment travelled east through Ottawa to the United Kingdom and on 18 August 1916, the Seaforths were in France. Receiving the number 72nd Battalion made the Seaforths the only Canadian regiment in World War I to deploy with its traditional regimental number as its CEF battalion number.

The Seaforths were involved in some of the bloodiest battles of the war including Ypres, the Somme, and Vimy Ridge. In the final battle for Vimy Ridge, Lieutenant D.O. Vicars and Private McWhinney (later Lieutenant McWhinney, DCM) with Corporal "Hat" Matthews took, unaided, 400 yards of the German Support Line, nearly the entire battalion front. Later in the battle, the commanding officer, Lieutenant Colonel J.A. Clark, DSO, with one junior officer, two runners and a Lewis gun crew, pushed up a mile in advance of the battalion where they met Brigadier McBrien and two senior officers armed only with revolvers, and promptly attacked a party of 50 enemy soldiers, driving them off. During the attack on Elev Spur, the retreating enemy were in such disarray the Sergeant W. Brown, MM, stepped into a poker game, which he broke up with his rifle. It is a special tribute that the German communiqué referred to the Seaforths as "specially picked assault troops."

One of the most notable actions in the history of the Seaforths was the capture of Crest Farm during the Battle of Passchendaele on 30 October 1917. A dispatch from the Commander-in-Chief, after the battle, stated in part that "the unit which took Crest Farm had by this action accomplished a feat of arms which would go down in the annals of British history as one of the greatest achievements of a single unit."

At 10:25 a.m. on 11 November 1918, the Seaforths received the following message while resting in Valenciennes. "Canadian Corps 06.45... Hostilities will cease at 11:00 hours on November 11th... Troops will stand fast on the line reached at that time which will be reported to Corps Headquarters... Strictest precautions will be maintained... There will be no intercourse of any description with the enemy... Further instructions follow... Fourth Canadian Division." The Great War was over.

The Seaforths would not leave France for home until May 1919 for there was still much work to be done. While they waited it was decided that the regiment should be presented with its new colours. The presentation was done on April 1, 1919, by Lieutenant General Arthur Currie, commander of the Canadian Corps. As the regiment marched off with their new colours flying in a stiff breeze "there was not a man present who did not feel that they focused the romance of the Battalion's history and the memories of the Battalion's dead."

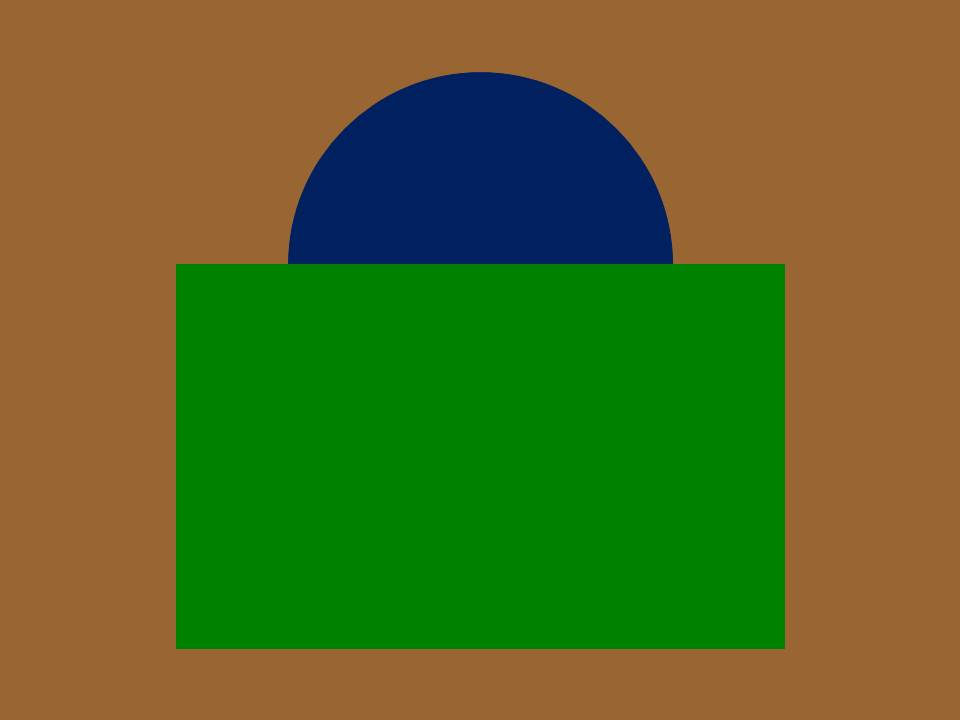
The distinguishing patch of the 72nd Battalion (Seaforth Highlanders of Canada), CEF.

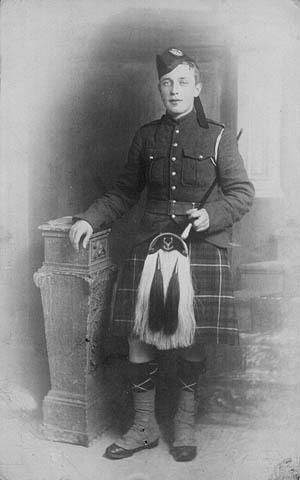
James C. Richardson of The Seaforth Highlanders of Canada Cadets. He would go on to win a Victoria Cross with the 16th Battalion (Canadian Scottish), CEF.

=== World War II ===
In the spring of 1939 it looked as if Canada would soon be at war again. Unlike the First World War this time The Seaforth Highlanders of Canada were among the first to deploy. On September 1, 1939, nine days before the Canadian declaration of war, the Seaforths were ordered to mobilize. In just one week the regiment recruited up to its full war-time strength and filled its first line of reinforcements. By Christmas 1939 they were aboard the UK troopship RMS Andes crossing the Atlantic to Scotland.

After the withdrawal from Dunkirk the Seaforths were one of the few fully equipped regiments in England. During the Battle of Britain they filled a variety of roles including manning anti-air batteries, providing anti-parachute defence and front-line coastal defence. In August 1942 Canada's 2nd Division invaded Dieppe. It was for his actions during this raid that former Seaforth officer Lieutenant Colonel Charles Merritt was awarded his Victoria Cross while commanding The South Saskatchewan Regiment. He was presumed dead but it was discovered later that he was in fact taken prisoner.

The Seaforths however as part of the 1st Canadian Infantry Division would not see combat until July 1943 in Operation Husky, the invasion of Sicily. The beach landing was relatively uneventful but the Seaforths would soon see hard battles as they fought veteran German units for hilltop town after hilltop town through Valguarnera, Leonforte, Nissoria, Agira and Regalbuto, to Adrano.

When the Seaforths crossed into Italy on 4 September 1943 they found themselves and the rest of 1st Division pursuing the Germans north. The Germans had decided not to defend the south of Italy but to fight only occasionally, buying time for them to build up their defences further north. By 25 October the Seaforths had fought their way over 300 miles from the landings in Reggio Calabria to the town of Baranello.

After a rest in Baranello the Seaforths were back into action. They had reached the Gustav Line, where the Germans planned to make their first stand. From December 6 to 22 the 1st Division advanced only three miles from the Moro River to the edge of a small town named Ortona. The town was on the eastern end of the Gustav Line on the Adriatic Sea. The narrow streets and dense buildings lead to intense street to street fighting. The battle was so intense that it was nicknamed "little Stalingrad".

Amidst the fighting on the night of 25 December the Seaforth's quartermaster arranged a Christmas dinner for the soldiers at the front. One at a time the four companies of the regiment were rotated off the line to the Church of Santa Maria di Constantinopoli. As they sat down to a fresh meal of roast pork and mashed potatoes one soldier, a corporal, played the church's organ over the roar of the battle just a few hundred yards to the north. A few days later on 28 December the Germans pulled out of Ortona during the night, leaving the town to the Allies. Every year the Seaforth Highlanders of Canada commemorate this battle with the Ortona Dinner. This commemorative dinner takes the place of the regiment's annual Christmas dinner. Veterans from the battle along with the unit's serving and former members sit down to a Christmas dinner with the same menu served in the church in 1943.

From Ortona the Seaforths continued to move north fighting through the Liri Valley and breaking through the Hitler Line, the Germans' second defensive line. This was the hardest fought battle for the Seaforths of the entire Italian campaign. At one point on the afternoon of 23 May 1944, the Seaforths, having taken the line, repelled a German counterattack, and when the Germans pulled off only eight soldiers remained, commanded by C Company Sergeant Major J.M. Duddle, who was the senior man left on the line. By the end of the day the Seaforths had taken 210 casualties including 52 killed.

The regiment continued fighting in Italy through Gothic Line, across the Savio River and through the Po Valley. Private E.A. "Smokey" Smith's actions in combat at the crossing of the Savio River earned him a Victoria Cross. On 13 March 1945 the Seaforths boarded ships to begin the trip to Northwest Europe where they were to be used in the liberation of The Netherlands.

The Seaforths travelled through Germany and entered The Netherlands on April 7 through the town of 's-Heerenberg. Their first action was the crossing of the IJssel River on 11 April. They then chased the Germans west across the fields south of Apeldoorn until the surrender of the Germans on 8 May 1945. On the 8th the Seaforths were ordered to Amsterdam to take possession from the German occupiers and make arrangements for the Germans to march home. The Seaforths were the first allied regiment to enter the city and the city lined the streets to welcome their liberators. The war was over. On 7 October 1945 the Seaforth Highlanders arrived home in Vancouver. An estimated 100,000 people lined the street from the Canadian Pacific Railway station to the Seaforth Armoury where the overseas battalion was dismissed for the last time.

=== Post-war ===
The Seaforth Highlanders of Canada has not served overseas as a regiment since the end of World War II but the regiment continues to contribute reserve soldiers to operations around the World. Between 1950 and 1953 many Seaforths volunteered to join the regular force in order to serve in the Korean War. Between 1951 and 1953 Seaforths could join the full-time army as members of the 27th Canadian Infantry Brigade's, 1st Canadian Highland Battalion, E Company (Seaforth Highlanders), which served in Germany until becoming part of The Black Watch (Royal Highland Regiment) of Canada in 1953. Members of the Seaforth Highlanders of Canada since 1953 have been able to volunteer for overseas and domestic operations as individual augmentees. These augmentees fill vacant positions in regular force units while the unit is deployed overseas and then return to their reserve regiments upon the end of the deployment. Seaforths have volunteered for operations in Egypt, Cyprus, Croatia, Bosnia and Herzegovina, Kuwait, and Afghanistan.

In 1967, Prince Philip, Duke of Edinburgh, was appointed the regiment's colonel-in-chief, a position he held until his death in 2021.

In September 1993, members of the regiment augmenting 2nd Battalion Princess Patricia's Canadian Light Infantry were involved in the fighting in the Medak Pocket. This operation involved fire fights between Croatian forces and the Canadians, who were there as part of the United Nations peacekeeping force. This was the first full combat action of Canadian troops since the Korean War and the Canadian Government keep it secret from the Canadian public for some time, much to the dismay of the returning veterans.

Since January 2006, members of the Seaforth Highlanders of Canada have deployed to Afghanistan in roles varying from training the Afghan National Army to conducting combat operations. Several members of the unit were wounded in action and were awarded the Sacrifice Medal. The Seaforth Highlanders of Canada were awarded the Battle Honour AFGHANISTAN for their efforts there by having more than 20% of the unit deployed in the Afghanistan theatre of operations.

=== Modern day ===
As a Primary Reserve unit most members of The Seaforth Highlanders are part-time soldiers. They train one night a week (currently Wednesdays) and one weekend per month. The rest of the time they work in civilian jobs or attend school. Often members will volunteer for full-time training or deployment opportunities. Their weekly training nights involve going to the Seaforth Armoury and training for three hours in the various skills required to be an infantry soldier.

The monthly weekend training exercise involves members reporting to the armoury on Friday night and going to one of the training areas in British Columbia or Washington state. There the soldiers combine and practice the skills they have learned during the weekly training nights before returning to the armoury on Sunday afternoon for dismissal.

Members of the Seaforth Highlanders can volunteer to deploy full-time on operations around the world. In the last 15 years Seaforths have deployed on operations in Croatia, Bosnia and Herzegovina and Afghanistan.

==== Centenary ====
2010 marked the 100th anniversary of the formation of the Seaforth Highlanders of Canada. Three public events were held to commemorate the regiment's achievements.

On May 29 the Seaforths hosted a military tattoo and community ceilidh at the Seaforth Armoury. The event included a ceremony honouring 20 Seaforth soldiers returning from service in Afghanistan.

On November 27 new regimental colours were presented to the regiment at the Doug Mitchell Thunderbird Sports Centre on the University of British Columbia campus. The colours were presented by the Lieutenant Governor of British Columbia, Steven Point. The ceremony included performances by the Seaforth Highlanders of Canada Pipes and Drums; the band of the 15th Field Regiment, RCA; and, the Seaforth Highlanders of Holland, a Dutch pipe band formed to commemorate the Seaforth's contribution to the liberation of the Netherlands during World War II.

On April 16, 2011, the regiment held a ceremony to lay up their old colours at Vancouver's Christ Church Cathedral. They then exercised their freedom of the city with a parade along Burrard Street from the cathedral to the Seaforth Armoury.

== Seaforth Highlanders of Canada Museum & Archives ==
Seaforth Museum
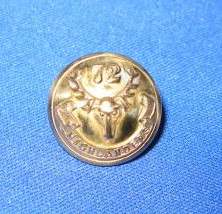
- Location: Vancouver, British Columbia
- Website: seaforthhighlanders.ca/visit/

The mission of the Seaforth Highlanders of Canada Regimental Museum and Archives is to collect, preserve and share material relating to the history of the Seaforth Highlanders of Canada.

The Museum was established in 1972 and it is now an official Canadian Forces Museum. There are currently displays throughout the Seaforth Armoury, as well as archival storage and research spaces on the second floor. The museum can be visited by appointment by contacting the regiment through their website, seaforthhighlanders.ca

The museum is a member of or affiliated with Canadian Museums Association, the British Columbia Museums Association, the Canadian Heritage Information Network, Organization of Military Museums of Canada and the Virtual Museum of Canada.

== Traditions ==
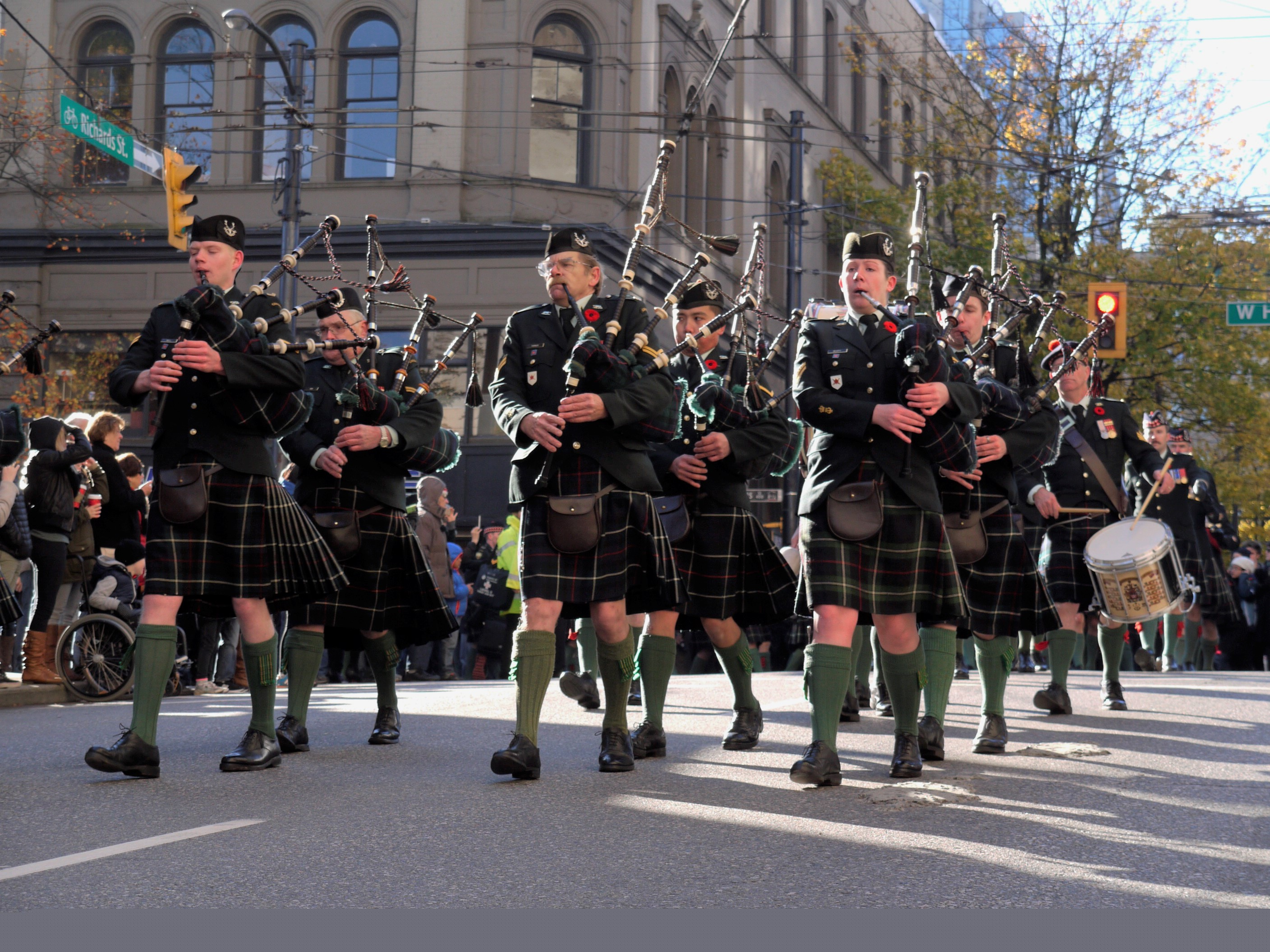
The pipes and drums of the regiment during a Remembrance Day parade in Vancouver, November 2014

=== Cap badge ===
A stag's head caboched above a scroll bearing the Gaelic motto cuidich'n righ, below a coronet of a son of the Sovereign and cypher of Prince Leopold, Duke of Albany. Senior non-commissioned officers wear the badge without the coronet and cypher while junior ranks wear a two-dimensional cap badge without the ducal coronet and cypher.

=== Battle cry ===
Tuloch Ard (the High Hill) From the rallying cry of the Seaforth Highlanders (Ross-shire Buffs, The Duke of Albany's), a British Army unit long since amalgamated into The Highlanders. The cry is derived from the name of the gathering place of the Clan Mackenzie, a mountain near Kintail in Ross-shire, Scotland.

Cabar feidh gu brath (the stag's head forever; often shortened to cabar feidh) is used by Seaforth members to show their regimental allegiance.

== Notable ==
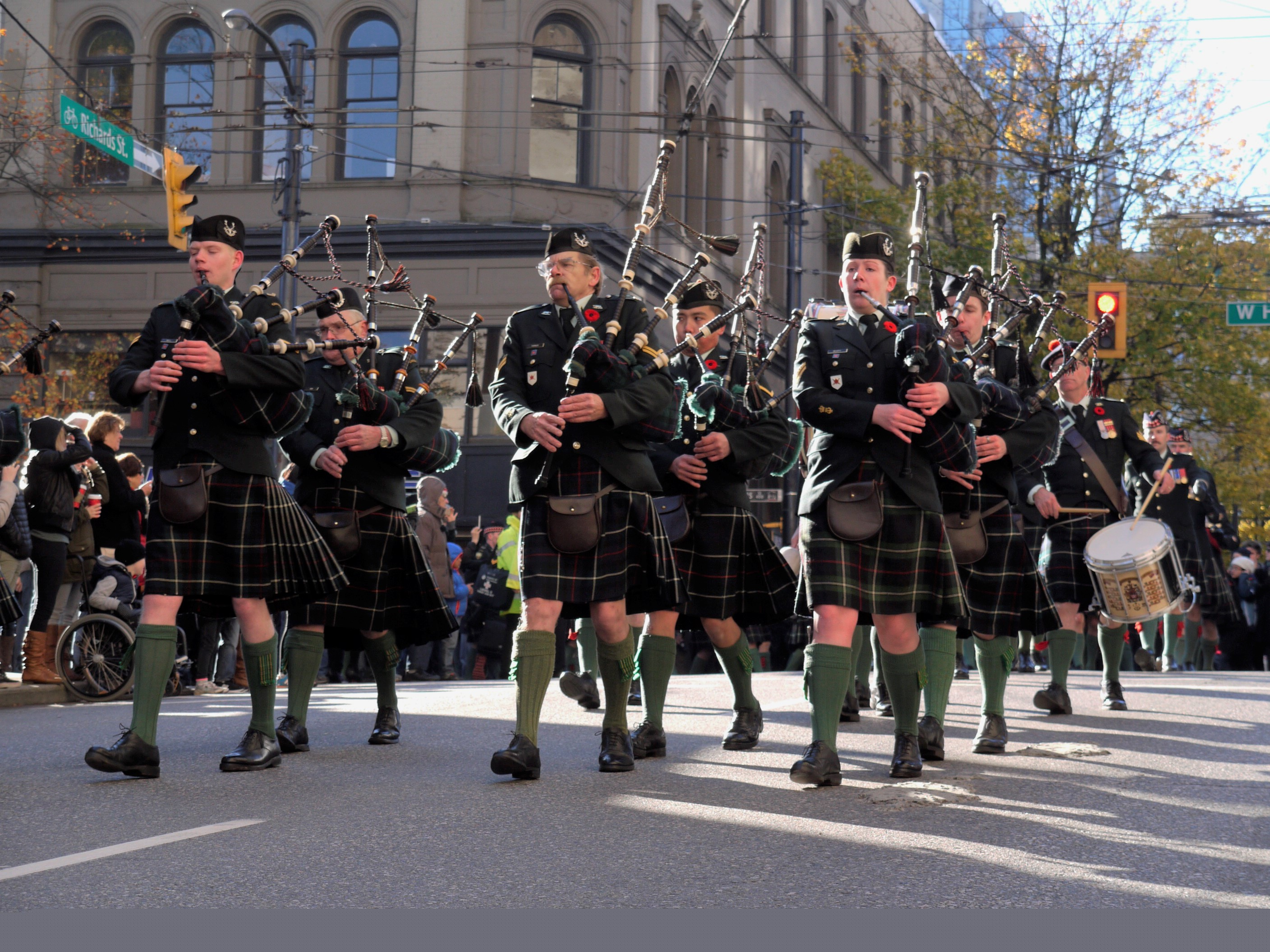
The pipes and drums of the regiment during a Remembrance Day parade in Vancouver, November 2014.

== Notable members of the regiment ==
- Bertram Meryl Hoffmeister (1907–1999), soldier, businessman and conservationist.
- Henry Pybus Bell-Irving (1913–2002), soldier, businessman and Lieutenant Governor of British Columbia.
- Charles Cecil Ingersol Merritt, VC (1908–2000), soldier, lawyer and politician.
- Eric Werge Hamber (1879–1960), soldier, businessman and Lieutenant Governor of British Columbia.
- John Arthur Clark (1886–1976), soldier, lawyer and politician.
- Harry Rankin (1920–2002), soldier, lawyer and politician.
- William Sampson (1959–2012) biochemist, author, rights activist.
- Charles Trevor Greene (1965–), soldier and author.
- Ven Begamudré (1956–), Canadian author and professor.
- Garnett Weston (1890–1980), Canadian author and screenwriter.

=== Victoria Cross recipients ===
==== World War II ====
- Private (later Sergeant) Ernest Alvia ("Smokey") Smith 21–22 October 1944 in Italy.
- Lt Colonel Charles Cecil Ingersoll Merritt 19 August 1942, at Dieppe, France. This was after long service with the Seaforths, and while commanding the South Saskatchewan Regiment. He later returned to the Seaforths as the Commanding Officer 1951-1954.

== Cadet units ==
There are several Royal Canadian Army Cadets units spread across British Columbia that are affiliated to the Seaforths. Cadets are not soldiers; they are part of an organization dedicated to developing citizenship and leadership among young men and women aged 12 to 18 years of age with a military flavour, and are not required to join the Canadian Forces.

Corps/Squadron	Website	Location	Meeting Times
72nd RCACC	https://72armycadets.com/	Vancouver	Tues. 6:30 - 9:00 pm
2812 RCACC	https://www.2812rcacc.com/	Surrey	Tues. 6:15 - 9:00 pm
2893 RCACC	https://www.facebook.com/2893Seaforth/	Port Coquitlam	Mon. 6:45-9:30 pm
2963 RCACC	https://www.facebook.com/2963seaforthhighlanders	Sechelt	Tues. 6:00 - 9:00 pm
2277 RCACC	https://www.facebook.com/groups/2277rcacc/	Langley	Mon. 6:00 - 9:00 pm
1867 RCACC	https://www.facebook.com/1867rcacc/	Delta	Tues. 6:30 - 9:00 pm
135 Sqn RCACS	http://www.135air.ca	Vancouver	Thurs. 6:30 - 9:00 pm

Cadet units affiliated to the Seaforth Highlanders of Canada receive support and also are entitled to wear traditional regimental accoutrements on their uniforms.

== Media ==
- A Narrative of War: From the Beaches of Sicily to the Hitler Line with the Seaforth Highlanders of Canada, 1943 by Robert L. McDougall (Sep 1 1996)
- The Seaforth Highlanders of Canada 1919–1965 by Roy Reginald H. (1969)
- History of the 72nd Canadian Infantry Battalion. Seaforth Highlanders of Canada by McEvoy, Bernard & Finlay, H. (1920)

== See also ==
- Canadian-Scottish regiment
- 231st Battalion (Seaforth Highlanders of Canada), CEF
- Trevor Greene

== Order of precedence ==
Preceded by Les Fusiliers de Sherbrooke	The Seaforth Highlanders of Canada	Succeeded by The Canadian Scottish Regiment (Princess Mary's)
