= Orsi =

Orsi is a surname of Italian origin, and may refer to the following people:

== Last name ==
- Adolfo Orsi (1888–1972), Italian industrialist, owner of Maserati
- Alberto Orsi, Italian gynaecologist and writer
- Anaïs Orsi, French climate scientist
- Anna del Salvatore Orsi (1842-1885), venerable Italian Catholic nun
- Benedetta Orsi (born 2000), Italian footballer
- Benedetto Orsi (died 1680), Italian painter
- Bianca Orsi (1915-2016), Italian sculptrix
- Carlo Orsi (fl. 1884–1894), Italian painter and sculptor
- Carlo Orsi (photographer) (1941-2021), Italian photographer
- Checco and Ludovico Orsi, brothers who led the assassination of Girolamo Riario in 1488
- Carlos Orsi (born 1971), Brazilian science journalist
- Clodomil Orsi, Brazilian football executive, Corinthians Chairman in 2007
- Dan Orsi (born 1992), Scottish footballer
- Danilo Orsi (born 1996), British footballer
- Delfino Orsi (1868-1929), Italian journalist and politician
- Fabio Orsi (born 1979), Italian musician
- Favio Orsi (born 1974), Argentine football player and manager
- Federico Ferrari Orsi (1886-1942), Italian general in the Royal Army during World War II
- Ferenc Örsi (1927-1994), Hungarian playwright
- Fernando Orsi (born 1959), Italian football manager and former player
- Francesco Orsi (born 1980), Italian philosopher and musician working in Estonia
- Franco Orsi (1966–2025), Italian politician
- Giovan Gioseffo Orsi (1652-1733), Italian poet
- Giovanni Battista Orsi (1600-1641), Italian architect active in Prague and Vienna
  - Giovanni Domenico Orsi (1634-1679), Italian-Bohemian architect, son of Giovanni Battista
- Giuseppe Agostino Orsi (1692–1761), Italian cardinal, theologian, and ecclesiastical historian
- Giuseppe Orsi (born 1945), Italian industrialist
- Giuseppe Orsi (officer) (1885-1911), Italian army officer died in Sciara Sciat, awarded posthumously the Gold Medal of Military Valor
- Guillermo Orsi (born 1946), Argentine journalist and novelist
- Hoover Orsi (born 1978), Brazilian race car driver
- John Orsi (1908–1978), American football player
- Julianna Örsi (born 1950), Hungarian ethnographer
- Kalvin Orsi (born 1997), Scottish football winger
- Leigh Ann Orsi (born 1981), American actress and dancer
- Lelio Orsi (1508/1511–1587), Italian Renaissance painter
- Marco Orsi (born 1990), Italian swimmer
- María Cristina Orsi (1947-2006), Argentine botanist
- Marcos Orsi (born 1964), Brazilian actor
- Máximo Orsi (1895-1972), Argentine composer
- Micaela Orsi (born 1993), Uruguayan model
- Ni Orsi Jr. (born 1944), American alpine skier
- Nivaldo Orsi, Brazilian clarinettist
- Paolo Orsi (1859–1935), Italian archaeologist and classicist
- Paolo Mangelli Orsi (1762-1846), Italian cardinal
- Paolo Orsi Mangelli (1880-1977), Italian entrepreneur and norse breeder, founder of SAOM and known as the "father of Italian trot"
- Pietro Orsi (1863-1943), Italian politician, mayor of Venice (1926-29)
- Phil Orsi (born 1939), American singer, songwriter, producer and musician
- Prospero Orsi (1560s-1630s), Italian painter of the late-Mannerist and early-Baroque period
- Raimundo Orsi (1901–1986), Argentinian-Italian footballer
- Reka Orsi Toth (born 1999), Italian beach volleyball player
- René Orsi (1919-1999), Argentine politician
- Robert Orsi (born 1953), American scholar
- Rocío Orsi (1976-2014), Spanish philosopher and professor
- Romeo Orsi (soldier) (1887-1913), Italian soldier who died in Libya, awarded posthumously the Gold Medal of Military Valor
- Orsi Instrument Company (1843-1918), Italian industrialist and manufacturer of wind instruments, founder of Orsi Instrument Company
- Tranquillo Orsi (1771–1845), Italian painter, scenographer, and architect
- Viktoria Orsi Toth (born 1990), Italian beach volleyball player
- Yamandú Orsi (born 1967), president of Uruguay

=== Families ===
- Orsi (family), 15th-century Italian noble family from Forlì
- Orsi Mangelli (est. 1639), Italian noble family from Forlì

== First name ==
Orsi is also a short form of female Hungarian first name Orsolya and may refer to:

- Orsi Fehér (born 1981), Hungarian model
- Orsi Husz (born 1969), Swedish historian
- Orsi Tóth (born 1981), Hungarian actress

== Companies and places ==
- Palazzo Orsi, 16th-century palace in Bologna, Italy
- Palazzo Orsi Mangelli, a Baroque architecture palace in Forlì, Italy
- Museo archeologico regionale Paolo Orsi (est. 1878), museum in Syracuse, Sicily
- Orsi Instrument Company (est. 1836), a clarinet maker
- Orsi Pietro & Figlio, or Orsi (1881-1964), Italian maker of agricultural machines
- Orsi Point, a headland in Malta on which Fort Ricasoli was built
  - Orsi Tower and Battery, a tower and battery on the headland (destroyed)
- Rifugio Ezio Orsi (built 1974), a mountain hut in Fabbrica Curone, in Italy
- Società Anonima Orsi Mangelli (SAOM, 1926-1977), Italian chemical company based in Forli, specialized in artificial silk

== See also ==
- D'Orsi, several people with this name
- Orsy (disambiguation)
- Orsi, nom de guerre of Antonio Carini (1902-1944), Italian partisan in World War II
- Gran Premio Orsi Mangelli, (est. 1944), a trot race named after Paolo Orsi Mangelli
