= 72nd Battalion (Seaforth Highlanders of Canada), CEF =

72nd Battalion, Canadian Expeditionary Force
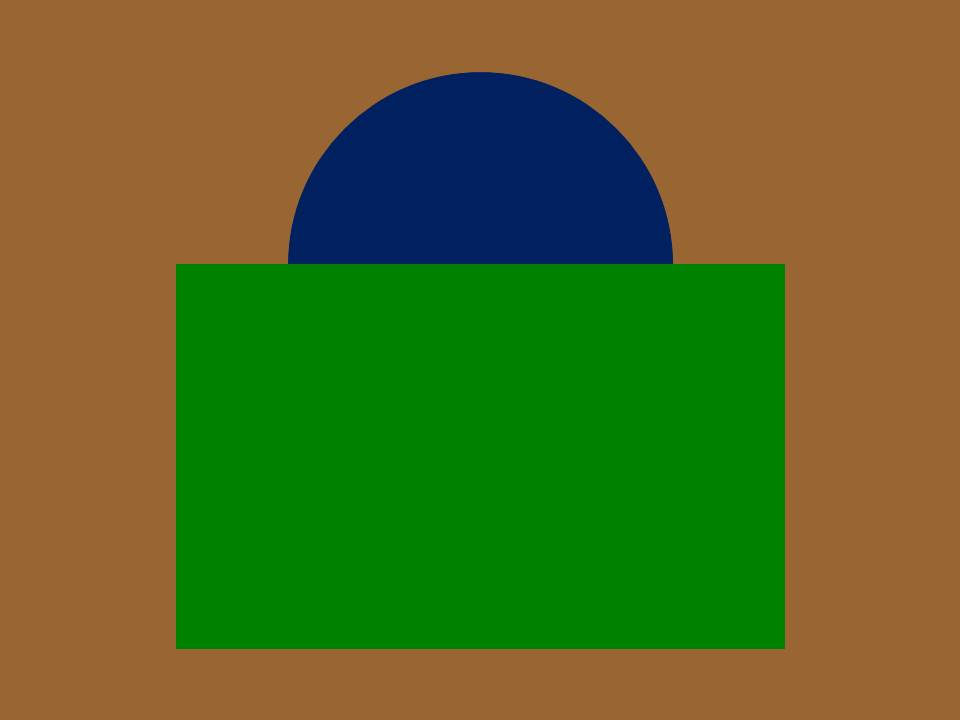
- The distinguishing patch of the 72nd Battalion (The Seaforth Highlanders of Canada), CEF.
- Active: 10 July 1915 – 30 August 1920
- Type: Infantry
- Engagements: World War I

The 72nd Battalion (The Seaforth Highlanders of Canada), CEF was an infantry battalion of the Canadian Expeditionary Force during World War I, and recruited throughout the province of British Columbia.

== History ==
The 72nd Battalion was authorized on 10 July 1915 at Vancouver, with recruitment centred around British Columbia, and embarked for Britain on 23 April 1916. It disembarked in France on 13 August 1916, where it fought as part of the 12th Infantry Brigade, 4th Canadian Division in France and Flanders until the end of the war. The battalion was disbanded on 30 August 1920.

Lt.-Col. John Arthur Clark, DSO commanded the 72nd Battalion from 25 April 1916 to 12 September 1918 and by Lt.-Col. G.H. Kirkpatrick, DSO, from 12 September 1918 to demobilization.

== Perpetuation ==
The 72nd Battalion (Seaforth Highlanders of Canada), CEF is perpetuated by The Seaforth Highlanders of Canada.

== Battle honours ==
The 72nd Battalion was awarded the following battle honours:

- SOMME, 1916
- Ancre Heights
- Ancre, 1916
- ARRAS, 1917, '18
- Vimy, 1917
- Ypres 1917
- Passchendaele
- AMIENS
- Scarpe, 1918
- Drocourt-Quéant
- HINDENBURG LINE
- Canal du Nord
- VALENCIENNES
- SAMBRE
- FRANCE AND FLANDERS, 1916-18

== See also ==
- List of infantry battalions in the Canadian Expeditionary Force

== Sources ==
- Canadian Expeditionary Force 1914–1919 by Col. G.W.L. Nicholson, CD, Queen's Printer, Ottawa, Ontario, 1962
