= Darcy Lear =

Australian rules footballer

Personal information
- Full name: Darcy Connor Lear
- Born: 7 June 1898; Eaglehawk, Victoria
- Died: 20 June 1967 (aged 69); Melbourne, Victoria
- Original team: Bendigo District

Playing career^{1}
| Years | Club | Games (Goals) |
| 1917 | Carlton | 12 (1) |
- ^{1} Playing statistics correct to the end of 1917.

Darcy Connor Lear (7 June 1898 – 20 June 1967) was an Australian rules footballer who played with Carlton in the Victorian Football League (VFL).
