= Kathy D'Arcy =

Irish poet and activist

- Born: Kathy D'Arcy; Cork, Ireland
- Occupations: Author, poet, activist, playwright
- Known for: Poetry, Prochoice activism, Theatre

Kathy D'Arcy is an Irish poet, feminist activist, workshop facilitator, and youth worker, from Cork, Ireland, but now based in Iceland. D'Arcy originally qualified as a doctor, before completing further M.A. and Ph.D. qualifications in Creative Writing at University College Cork. She teaches in the Women's Studies and Adult Education departments of the University.

== Career and major works ==
Kathy D'Arcy is the author of two collections of poetry, Encounter (Lapwing 2010) and The Wild Pupil (Bradshaw 2012). Her doctoral research was funded by an Irish Research Council Postgraduate Scholarship. D'Arcy has also written plays. Her first play, Retreat, was performed in the Granary theatre in 2008. Her second, This is My Constitution, was performed in Dáil Éireann at a parliamentary briefing on gender bias in the Irish Constitution during the Constitutional Convention in 2014.

In 2017, she was awarded first prize in the FPM Hippocrates Heath Professional Award for her poem "Inside". D'Arcy has stated that "Inside" is a poem about the human heart and people's relationship with it.

She was 2016 editor of the Cork Literary Review and is current editor of Rhyme Rag, an online poetry journal for young people, organised by the Arts Office of Kilkenny County Council. She facilitates creative writing workshops for beginners and intermediate writers. Through the Adult Continuing Education department in University College Cork, D'Arcy offered a course on "Finding Your Voice" in 2018.

== Writing and political activism ==
D'Arcy is a prominent feminist activist. She was heavily involved in the campaign to repeal the Eighth Amendment in Ireland, primarily as the chair of the Cork section of Together for Yes.

D'Arcy collaborated with New Binary Press to edit a collection of writing called Autonomy in 2018, a woman-led collection focusing on bodily autonomy. The proceeds from the collection are donated to the campaign for free, safe and legal abortion in Ireland. According to D'Arcy, the collection includes "not just stories about abortion, though there are many – stories about all of the ways our bodily integrity can be attacked, and how we can rise up nonetheless and speak out for ourselves and others. Contributors wrote about sexuality, ability, belonging, violence, mortality, compassion, support, celebration."

In 2013, D'Arcy wrote and performed This Is My Constitution, a play about the impact that the Irish Constitution has on the lives and bodies of women in Ireland. In particular the play focuses on the 1937 fight by women in Ireland to change the draft Constitution. She performed it in Paul Street Square in Cork City on 12 February 2013, as well as other locations around Ireland with the support of the National Women's Council of Ireland. A performance of the play was also supported by Cork Feminista. This was performed on 13 April in Cork City Centre by Ungovernable Bodies, and directed by Judie Chambers.

== Awards ==
- Arts Council Literature Bursary, 2013
- Irish Research Council Postgraduate Scholarship
- FPM HIPPOCRATES HEALTH PROFESSIONAL FIRST PRIZE, 2017

== Publications ==
- Encounter, 2010
- The Wild Pupil, 2012
