= D'Orsi =

D'Orsi is a surname of Italian origin. Notable people with the surname include:

- Achille D'Orsi (1845–1929), Italian sculptor from Naples
- Angelo d'Orsi (b. 1947), Italian historian
- Domenico D'Orsi (1930–2010), Italian philosopher
- Eugenio D'Orsi (b. 1958), Italian politician, president of the Province of Agrigento
- Juan Zanassi, born Juan Francisco Zanassi D'Orsi (1947–2022), Argentine rower and journalist
- Libero D'Orsi (1888–1977), Italian archaeologist
- Lucy D'Orsi (born 1969), British police officer
- Ugo D'Orsi (1897-1964), Brazilian-American animator
- Umberto D'Orsi (1929–1976), Italian character actor and comedian

Fictional characters

- Enrico D'Orsi, played by Jean-Louis Trintignant in the Italian film La terrazza (1980)
- Commander D'Orsi, played by Omar Sy in the French film The Wolf's Call (2019)

== See also ==
- Orsi
- D'arcy (name)
- Jean-Baptiste-François Gigot d'Orcy (1737–1793), French entomologist and mineralogist
