= Orczy =

Orczy, Orczi may refer to:

- Orci, village in Somogy County, Hungary
- Orczy, a neighborhood in Budapest's VIII district, Hungary
- Orczy family (Orczy de Orczi, hu:Orczy család), Hungarian nobility originating from Orci
  - Lőrinc Orczy (hu:Orczy Lőrinc), poet
  - Béla Orczy (1822–1917), politician
  - Emma Orczy (Baroness Orczy, 1865–1947), Hungarian-born British novelist and playwright
- Orțișoara (Orczyfalva in Hungarian), village in Romania

== See also ==
- List of titled noble families in the Kingdom of Hungary
