= Palazzo Orsi Mangelli =

Palace in Forlì, Italy

Coordinates: 44°14′N 12°03′E

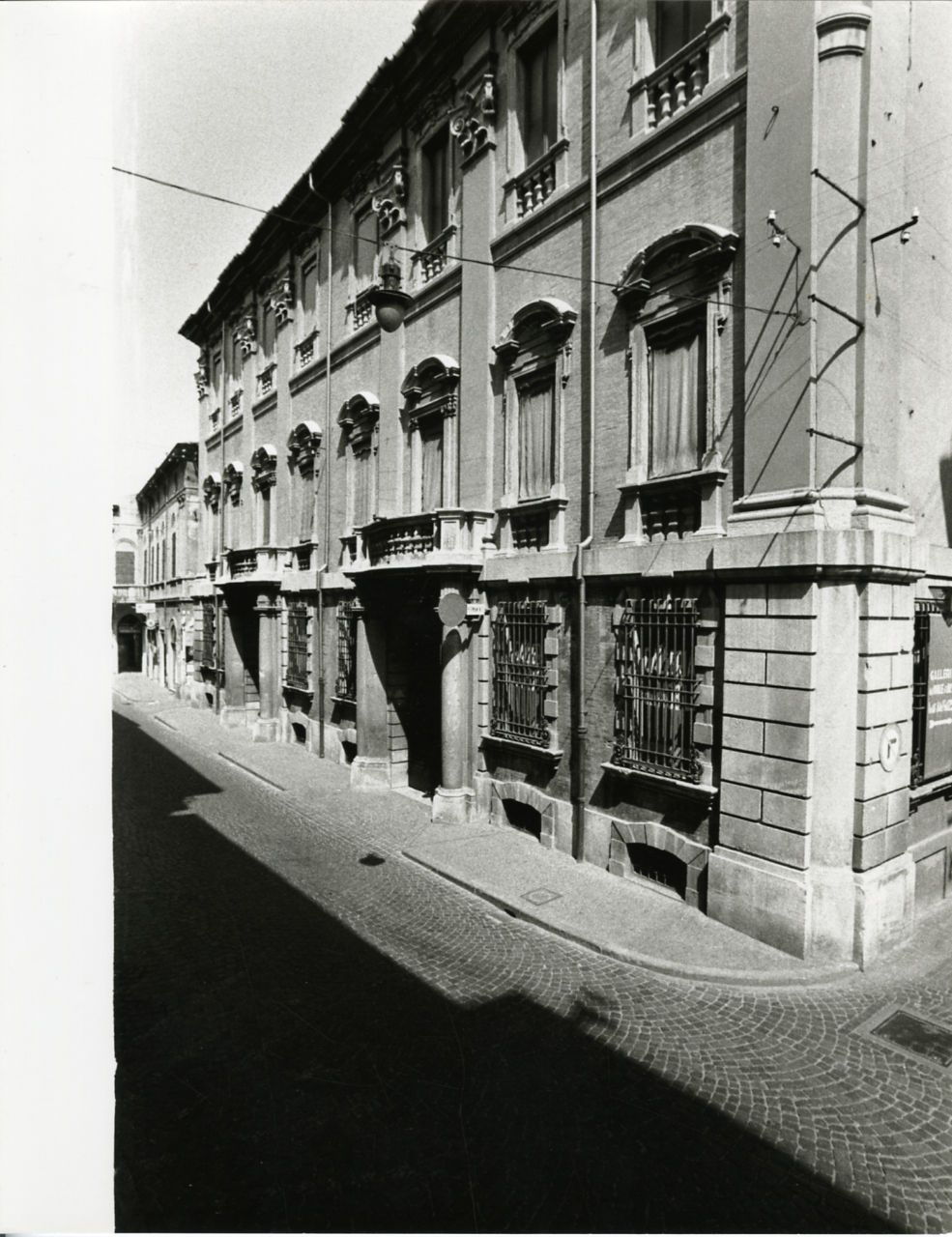
The facade in a 1971 photograph by Paolo Monti

Palazzo Orsi Mangelli is a Baroque architecture palace in Forlì, Italy. It was built in the 17th and 18th centuries, and rebuilt twice in the 20th century.

It previously housed the University of Bologna faculty of Political Science. In 2015 it housed the headquarters of Luxury Living Group, a company in the design and furniture.
