= Barbara D'Arcy =

Barbara D'Arcy (1928–2012) was an American interior designer, noted as one of the most important visual merchandisers of the 20th century.

== Early life ==
Barbara D’Arcy was born on April 3, 1928, in Manhattan, the youngest of three children of Ida Marie and James J. D’Arcy. Her mother was an art teacher, her father a manager for a Manhattan moving and storage company. Her father's job made him a discerning judge of furniture.

D'Arcy attended Hunter Model School (today Hunter Elementary and High School). She graduated from the College of New Rochelle.

== Career ==
After graduating college, D'Arcy joined Bloomingdale's as a junior decorator in the fabric department in 1952. In the 1950s, Bloomingdale's was moving away from its roots as a "garden variety neighborhood department store" and trying to become a higher-end retailer. European furniture designers were happy to find a new market in New York and Bloomingdale's soon began creating model rooms to display the merchandise.

In 1958, D'Arcy was named coordinating designer of the store's model rooms. From 1958 until 1973 she designed hundreds of model rooms in themes ranging from Danish Modern to French Country.

Each showroom D'Arcy created was unique. She would use a few characteristic details that captured the world's attention. For example, when D'Arcy used treillage (the French word for vine arbor, latticework; a lattice or trellis), the Edwardian architectural style mixed with French style. D'Arcy was able to create a contemporary French country style through the use of all white lacquered furniture within a white octagon shaped pavilion.

One of D'Arcy White's best known showrooms, called "Saturday Generation", was in collaboration with Frank Gehry. This room encompassed a warm, monastic feeling by using cardboard as the only material. At the time, the use of cardboard was a surprising yet stylish use for an old, underrated material. Its popularity was founded on the practicality of the material in combination with the modernity of the shapes.

Another well-known model room was the Cave Room, a Flintstonesque room made from a frame of chicken wire and wood, sprayed with urethane foam and painted white. The furniture was built into the foam.

D’Arcy was credited with creating or popularizing several styles that still resonate in the American home, including steel and glass furnishings, plaid curtains for children's rooms, and the "Country French" look.

D’Arcy became a merchandising executive in 1975 and she traveled the world as part of a Bloomingdale's team of design scouts. She was among the first Americans to visit the People's Republic of China on business after its relations with the United States were normalized in 1972.

In the late 1970s Ms. D’Arcy directed the redesign of Bloomingdale's entire first floor, a three-year project. The redesign was completed in 1979 and the black marble and brass-look of the store has since become iconic.

== Later life ==
D'Arcy remained with Bloomingdale's until her retirement in 1995. She died on May 10, 2012, in Southampton, NY, at the age of 84.

== Bibliography ==
- "Bloomingdales 1970s Display Rooms by Barbara D’Arcy." Ouno Design RSS. 2009. Accessed September 23, 2016. http://ounodesign.com/2009/05/11/bloomingdales/.
- Boules, Jennifer Of. "The Legendary Barbara D'Arcy." The Peak of Chic:. 2016. Accessed September 23, 2016. http://thepeakofchic.blogspot.com/2012/05/legendary-barbara-darcy.html.
- Bradford, Barbara Taylor. "Barbara D'Arcy: A Trend-Setting Interior Designer." Sarasota Herald-Tribune (Sarasota), August 20, 1972. Accessed September 23, 2016. https://news.google.com/newspapers?nid=1755&dat=19720820&id=QLoqAAAAIBAJ&sjid=nWYEAAAAIBAJ&pg=2337,1549265&hl=en.
- By Star Staff | May 24, 2012 – 9:50 am. "Barbara D'Arcy White." The East Hampton Star. May 24, 2012. Accessed September 23, 2016. http://easthamptonstar.com/Obituaries/2012524/Barbara-D’Arcy-White.
- D'Arcy, Barbara. Bloomingdale's Book of Home Decorating. New York: Harper & Row, 1973.
- Ecker, Shana. "Bloomingdales Vintage Home Photos: A Piece Of Awesomely Retro 70s Interior Design History." The Huffington Post. October 1, 2012. Accessed September 23, 2016. http://www.huffingtonpost.com/2012/09/26/bloomingdales-vintage-home-photos_n_1917411.html.
- Furniture-Today, May 28, 2012. ISSN 0194-360X, Volume 36, Issue 37, pg. 25.
- Kirkham, Pat. Women Designers in the US, 1900–2000: Diversity and Difference: Jacqueline M. Atkins. New Haven, CT: Yale University Press, 2000.
- Kuhn, Betsy. The Race for Space: The United States and the Soviet Union Compete for the New Frontier. Minneapolis, MN: Twenty-First Century Books, 2007.

Pg. 46

- Vitello, Paul. "Barbara D’Arcy White, Interior Design Guru, Dies at 84." The New York Times. May 18, 2012. Accessed September 23, 2016. https://www.nytimes.com/2012/05/19/arts/design/barbara-darcy-white-interior-design-guru-dies-at-84.html?_r=1.
