= Dennis D'Arcy =

Scottish footballer

Personal information
- Date of birth: 30 November 1951 (age 74)
- Place of birth: Aberdeen, Scotland
- Position: Central defender

Youth career
- Banks O' Dee

Senior career*
Years	Team	Apps	(Gls)
1970–1979	Montrose	298	(4)
1979–1980	Arbroath	3	(0)
1980–1982	Deveronvale	?	(?)
1982–1984	Montrose	11	(0)
Total		312	(4)

Managerial career
- 1980–1981: Peterhead
- 1983: Montrose
- * Club domestic league appearances and goals

Dennis D'Arcy (born 30 November 1951) is a Scottish former professional footballer who played as a central defender.

== Career ==
Born in Aberdeen, D'Arcy began his career in junior football with Banks O' Dee, before turning professional in 1970 with Montrose. He later played for Arbroath and Deveronvale, before returning to Montrose. D'Arcy retired from professional football in 1984.
