= Don Darcey =

Australian rules footballer

Personal information
- Full name: Donald John Darcey
- Born: 29 August 1934
- Original team: South Fremantle
- Height: 179 cm (5 ft 10 in)
- Weight: 81 kg (179 lb)

Playing career^{1}
Years	Club	Games (Goals)
1956–57	South Fremantle (WAFL)	28 (0)
1958–60	Footscray	16 (2)
- ^{1} Playing statistics correct to the end of 1960.

Donald John Darcey (born 29 August 1934) is a former Australian rules footballer who played with Footscray in the Victorian Football League (VFL).
