= William D'Arcy =

William D'Arcy may refer to:

- Bill D'Arcy (William Theodore D'Arcy, born 1939), Queensland politician, accused and convicted of sexual abuse of children
- William Knox D'Arcy (1849–1917), furthered British interests in developing Persian (Iranian) oil
- William Alexander D'Arcy (1863–1940), cricketer from New Zealand

== See also ==
- Sir William Darcy (c. 1460–1540), Anglo-Irish statesman
- William Darcy, a fictional character from The Lizzie Bennet Diaries, the 2012 web series
