= Tom Darcy (footballer) =

Australian rules footballer

Personal information
- Full name: Thomas Darcy
- Born: 22 February 1881; Toolamba, Victoria
- Died: 29 September 1955 (aged 74); Cheltenham, Victoria
- Original team: Tatura

Playing career^{1}
Years	Club	Games (Goals)
1904	South Melbourne	1 (0)
- ^{1} Playing statistics correct to the end of 1904.

Thomas Darcy (22 February 1881 – 29 September 1955) was an Australian rules footballer who played a single game with South Melbourne in the Victorian Football League (VFL) in 1904.
