= James D'Arcy-Evans =

Australian cricket umpire (1935–2018)

Eyre James D'Arcy-Evans (26 July 1935 – 2 September 2018) was an international cricket umpire. He has umpired in 1 Women's Test match, 14 First-class matches and 3 List A matches.
