= Trevor Greene =

Canadian soldier

Charles Trevor Greene
- Born: 1965 (age 60–61); Sydney, Nova Scotia
- Occupations: Writer, journalist
- Known for: Victim of the 2006 « Axe Attack » in Afghanistan; subject of CTV's documentary Peace Warrior

Captain Charles Trevor Greene (born 1965) is a writer, journalist, and a former officer in the Seaforth Highlanders of the Canadian Forces. Greene sustained a massive brain injury after a much publicized attack on March 4, 2006, in the Kandahar Province, Afghanistan. Greene is notable for being one of the first recipients of the Sacrifice Medal and being the subject of a feature-length documentary that won a Gemini Award, Peace Warrior, which documents his recovery. Greene was also a torch-bearer for the 2010 Vancouver Paralympics.

== Biography ==
Greene was born in 1965 to Richard and Elizabeth Greene in Sydney, Nova Scotia. He attended King's College in Halifax, Nova Scotia where he completed a bachelor's degree of journalism with honours in 1988. Greene moved to Japan soon after, to work for Bloomberg News and the Yomiuri Shimbun.

Greene joined the Canadian Navy in 1995, where he sailed on HMCS Oriole, the Navy's tall sail-training ship and the oldest commissioned ship of the Canadian Forces. He then settled in Vancouver, British Columbia, and transferred to the Canadian Army's reserve, as an officer in a reserve infantry unit, the Seaforth Highlanders of Canada. He also joined Bloomberg News Vancouver bureau and began researching and writing about the Downtown Eastside, an area encompassing five neighborhoods, an area noted for a high incidence of poverty, drug use and sex trade.

In 2001, Greene met his future wife, Debbie Lepore, a chartered accountant. In 2005, their daughter Grace was born. On July 24, 2010, Lepore and Greene were married.

Greene is the honorary patron of the Honour House Society, an organization dedicated to help the families of wounded Canadian soldiers in the New-Westminster-Vancouver area. Honour House is located in New Westminster. He was also awarded with an Honorary Doctor of Civil Laws in May 2009.

== Deployment, injury and recovery ==
Lieutenant Greene deployed to Afghanistan in 2006 as a Civilian-Military Cooperation (CIMIC) officer, volunteering from his home unit of the Seaforth Highlanders of Canada.

On March 6, 2006, his platoon, composed of members of Princess Patricia's Canadian Light Infantry, 1st Battalion, Alpha Company, visited a number of villages, including the village of Shinkay in the Shinkay District, to talk with the village elders about access to clean water and other basic needs under Canada's area of responsibility. After the soldiers removed their helmets, a common practice as a sign of respect, Abdul Kareem (or Abdullah Karim), a sixteen-year-old boy, almost split Greene's brain in half by hitting him with a locally made axe. Kareem tried to hit again but was shot and killed by other members of the platoon. The platoon then came under heavy fire while waiting for a US Army medical evacuation helicopter. Greene received care on the helicopter, and medic Gary Adams was able to unblock his airway. Greene was transported, after getting a brief assessment, to the then Canadian-led hospital at Kandahar Air Field where he was stabilized.

He was later evacuated to the Ramstein Air Base in Germany from which he was transferred to the Landstuhl Regional Medical Center, the largest US Army medical facility outside the continental United States. There, he underwent further surgery to allow his brain to swell without causing further damage.

Shortly after being stabilized, Greene was transferred from Landstuhl to the Vancouver General Hospital, where doctors initially thought he would never come out of his coma. Greene underwent two bilateral cranioplasties, with the second one successfully repairing his skull. He was also subject to physiotherapy sessions, which lacked results, at first. Greene was then released from the hospital and was transferred to a private-care rehabilitation center in Langley, BC. On April 30, 2007, Trevor Greene started speech therapy sessions.

Greene's Arid CADPAT Afghanistan uniforms and kit including his armoured vest and his green CADPAT tactical vest (which the medics cut off of him when he was injured) are in the collection of the Seaforth Foundation and have been displayed in the Seaforth Highlanders of Canada Museum and Archives. His rank insignia on the uniforms is still that of Lieutenant as he was promoted the day of the attack and had not yet changed to a Captain's rank. (Seaforth Foundation Accession Number 2009.3.1 etc.)

In July 2007, Greene was admitted to the Centennial Centre for Mental Health and Brain Injury in Ponoka, Alberta, for long-term care and rehabilitation. At that stage, he had made slow but significant progress, and was able to open and close his hands, among other things.

In December 2007, Canadian Forces engineers installed a lift at Lepore's residence in Alberta, which allowed Greene to come home for Christmas and on week-ends. Around the same time, they also received a wheelchair accessible van from the then-new Military Casualty Support Foundation.

In September 2008, Greene moved to Nanaimo, BC, with his wife and daughter, after spending 14 months at the Alberta facility. As of 2010, Greene is now able to stand, but still cannot walk.

== Documentary ==
Greene was the subject of the documentary Peace Warrior by filmmaker Sue Ridout, produced by Dreamfilm Productions and broadcast by CTV. The documentary was narrated by Eric McCormack.

== Publications ==
- Trevor Greene : Bad Date: The Lost Girls of Vancouver's Low Track, ECW Press (October 1, 2001) ISBN 978-1-55022-474-0
- Shane Gibson, Trevor Greene : Closing Bigger - the Field Guide to Closing Bigger Deals, Knowledge Brokers International (October 15, 2005) ISBN 978-0-9738174-0-9
- Debbie Greene, Trevor Greene : March Forth: The Inspiring True Story Of A Canadian Soldier's Journey Of Love, Hope and Survival, HarperCollins Publishers Ltd (Mar 13 2012) ISBN 978-1443405126

== See also ==
- Canadian Forces
- Sacrifice Medal
- War in Afghanistan
