= Darcy (surname) =

Origin
- Languages: French, Irish

Darcy (or variant forms Darci, Darcie, or Darcey) is a surname from the Norman barony of Arcy, La Manche, in what was once Normandy, a duchy/dukedom under the French king), but is now Northern France. The surname became popular in the English language after the Norman conquest of England; while more popular as a surname, it does have some popularity as a given name. Derived given names include girl's names like Darcene. The surname is also applied as an anglicization for the Gaelic surname Ó Dorchaidhe.

People with this surname include:

- Conyers Darcy (1685–1758), British politician and courtier
- Dame Darcy (born 1971), American graphic artist, cartoonist, and musician
- Eamonn Darcy (born 1952), Irish golfer
- Elizabeth Darcy, Countess of Ormond (1332–1390)
- Elizabeth Darcy, Countess of Rivers and Viscountess of Savage (1581–1650)
- Elizabeth Darcy, nursemaid of then-infant Arthur, Prince of Wales (firstborn son of Henry VII of King Henry VII of England).
- Emma Darcy, pseudonym of Australian husband and wife writers Frank and Wendy Brennan
- Henry Darcy (1803–1858), French scientist who made several important contributions to hydraulics and hydrogeology and for whom the unit of permeability is named
- John Darcy, 1st Baron Darcy de Knayth (1290–1347), English peer and Lord Justiciar of Ireland
- Judy Darcy (born 1950), Danish health care advocate, trade unionist, and politician.
- Les Darcy (1895–1917), Australian boxer
- Luke Darcy (born 1975), former Australian rules footballer
- Oliver Darcy (born 1990), American journalist
- Robert Darcy, 4th Earl of Holderness (1718–1778), British diplomat and politician
- Susan Darcy (born 1956), American test pilot
- Thomas Darcy, 1st Baron Darcy de Darcy (1467–1537), an English nobleman convicted of high treason and executed for his role in the Pilgrimage of Grace

== Fictional characters ==
- Elizabeth Darcy, the female protagonist in Jane Austen's novel Pride and Prejudice.
- Mr. Fitzwilliam Darcy, Esquire, the male protagonist in Jane Austen's novel, Pride and Prejudice.
- Mark Darcy, from Helen Fielding's novel Bridget Jones's Diary

== See also ==
- D'arcy (name)
- Darcy (disambiguation)
