= John D'Arcy =

John D'Arcy may refer to:

- John D'Arcy (cricketer) (born 1936), New Zealand cricketer
- John D'Arcy (footballer) (1935–2019), Australian rules footballer
- John D'Arcy (landowner) (1785–1839), Irish landowner
- John Michael D'Arcy (1932–2013), American Roman Catholic bishop
- John P. D'Arcy (1957–1994), American electrical engineer
- John D'Arcy (British Army officer) (1894–1966), British general
- John D'Arcy (politician) (1787–1864), Irish politician

== See also ==
- John Darcy (disambiguation), several people
