= Tommy D'Arcy =

Scottish footballer

Personal information
- Full name: Thomas McDonald D'Arcy
- Date of birth: 22 June 1932
- Place of birth: Edinburgh, Scotland
- Date of death: 20 September 1985 (aged 53)
- Place of death: Sudbury, England
- Position: Centre forward

Youth career
- –: Armadale Thistle

Senior career*
| Years | Team | Apps | (Gls) |
| 1953–1954 | Hibernian | 3 | (0) |
| 1954–1956 | Bournemouth & Boscombe Athletic | 0 | (0) |
| 1956–1958 | Southend United | 4 | (0) |
| 1958–1959 | Queen of the South | 2 | (0) |
| 1959–1960 | Stranraer | 24 | (11) |
| Total | | 33 | (11) |
- * Club domestic league appearances and goals

Thomas McDonald D'Arcy (22 June 1932 – 20 September 1985) was a Scottish professional footballer who played as a centre forward.

== Career ==
Born in Edinburgh, D'Arcy played junior football with Armadale Thistle before turning professional with Hibernian in 1953. He later played for Southend United, Queen of the South and Stranraer, before retiring in 1960.
