= Seaforth Armoury =

Coordinates: 49°16′16″N 123°08′40″W

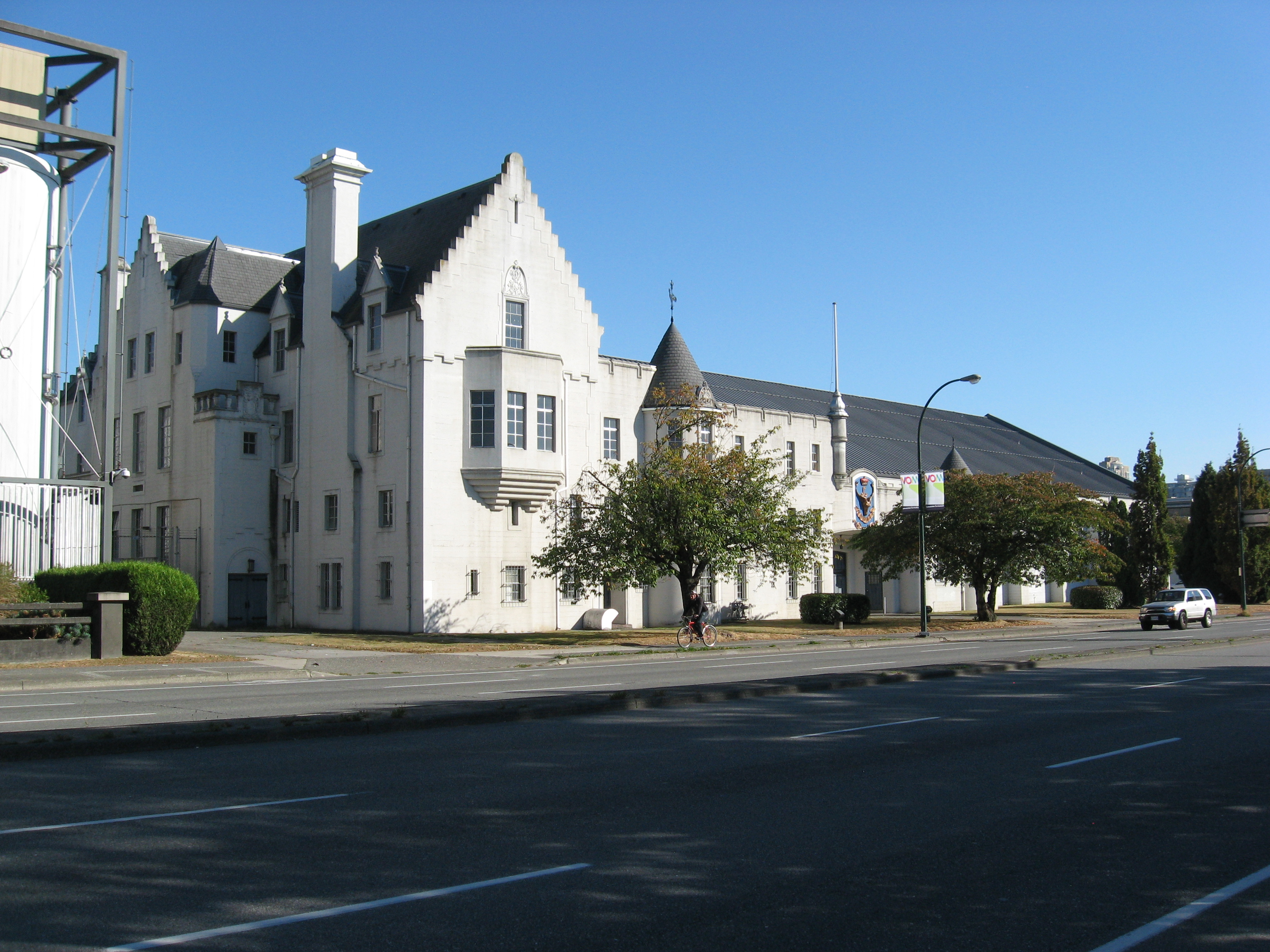
- Seaforth Armoury on Burrard Street in Vancouver

General information
- Type: Drill Hall / armoury
- Architectural style: fortified,
- Location: Vancouver British Columbia, 1650 Burrard Street
- Current tenants: The Seaforth Highlanders of Canada,
- Construction started: 1930
- Completed: 1936
- Inaugurated: 26 August 1936
- Owner: Canadian Forces

Technical details
- Structural system: massive, low-massed, asymmetrical, concrete

Design and construction
- Architects: McCarter and Nairne
- Awards: Canada's Register of Historic Places; Classified - 1997 Register of the Government of Canada Heritage Buildings

Renovating team
- Awards: Class A Heritage Building

The Seaforth Armoury is a Canadian Forces armoury located at 1650 Burrard Street in Vancouver, British Columbia. It is the home of The Seaforth Highlanders of Canada, a Primary Reserve Infantry unit. The building was designed by the architectural firm of McCarter and Nairne, and is now listed as a Class A Heritage Building.

== History ==
From their creation in 1910 until 1935 The Seaforth Highlanders of Canada paraded at the Beatty Street Drill Hall with the Duke of Connaught's Own Rifles. The government was petitioned for a separate armoury to house the regiment and in the early 1930s a site was selected. The site selected was a plot of unused land at the south end of the recently completed Burrard Street Bridge. The address was fixed at 1650 on what had been called Cedar Street but upon completion of the bridge Cedar Street became Burrard Street.

Work began in 1935 and construction was finished in 1936. The Armoury was opened on 26 August 1936. The Seaforth Highlanders of Canada formed up in a hollow square and the Governor General, Lord Tweedsmuir, took the Royal Salute as the first parade was held on the Square.

In June, 2012 the Armoury began a 3-year $9.3 million seismic upgrade to upgrading the existing structure and renovation. A further $31.2 million was allocated to Carillion Pacific Construction for the construction of a new five-storey building which will be used for support organizations, as well as the headquarters for the 39 Canadian Brigade Group. The Jericho Armoury will be relocated to the Seaforth location, then divested.

The Renovation was completed in May 2016. On Saturday 24 September 2016, the Seaforth Highlanders of Canada marched back to the Seaforth Armoury after an absence of four years.

The new building becomes the new Vancouver Garrison and was officially named the Major General Bertram Hoffmeister Building after one of Canada's best Generals, who had served for many years as a Seaforth.

== Occupants ==
In the Canadian Forces, an armoury is a place where a reserve unit trains, meets, and parades.

As well as being the home of the Seaforth Highlanders of Canada, the Seaforth Armoury is home to The Seaforth Museum, an official Canadian Forces Museum.

In addition the armoury also garrisons two cadet units:

- 72 (The Seaforth Highlanders of Canada) Royal Canadian Army Cadet Corps
- 135 (Bell-Irving) Royal Canadian Air Cadet Squadron

== See also ==
- List of Armouries in Canada
- List of heritage buildings in Vancouver
- Seaforth Peace Park
