= Gemma D'Arcy =

Gemma Donna Louise D'Arcy (1983–1990) was born in Cumbria in November 1983. She was briefly famous in Britain due to suffering chronic myeloid leukaemia, extremely rare in children and hypothesised to have been caused by her family living in proximity to the Sellafield nuclear power plant.

She died in September 1990 after three bone marrow transplants, aged six years and ten months. Her life was the subject of an ITV docu-drama Fighting for Gemma in 1993, detailing her family's attempts to bring a criminal case against BNFL for damages relating to her illness.

Her mother Susan later wrote a book, Still Fighting For Gemma in which she voiced her criticisms of British Nuclear Fuels and the nuclear industry in general.
