= Tom Darcey =

Australian rower

Personal information
- Nationality: Australian
- Born: 1 May 1906; Launceston, Tasmania, Australia
- Died: 10 September 1960 (aged 54)

Sport
- Sport: Rowing

Tom Darcey (1 May 1906 – 10 September 1960) was an Australian rower. He competed in the men's coxed four event at the 1948 Summer Olympics.
